= SS command of Auschwitz concentration camp =

Responsibility of the Auschwitz concentration camp

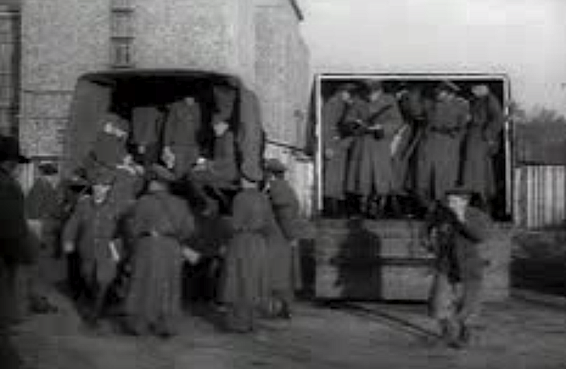
"The Trial of Forty German Butchers of Auschwitz Camp,” Kraków, 1947

The SS command of Auschwitz concentration camp refers to those units, commands, and agencies of the German SS which operated and administered during World War II. Due to its large size and key role in the Nazi genocide program, the Auschwitz concentration camp encompassed personnel from several different branches of the SS, some of which held overlapping and shared areas of responsibility.

There were over 7,000 SS personnel who served at Auschwitz from the time of the camp's construction in 1940 to the camp's liberation by the Red Army in January 1945. Fewer than 800 were ever tried for war crimes, the most notable of which were the trials of camp commanders Rudolf Höss and Robert Mulka, as well as several others tried between 1946 and 1948.

== Senior chain of command ==
The commander of the SS, Reichsführer-SS Heinrich Himmler, was the highest SS official with knowledge of Auschwitz and the function which the camp served. Himmler was known to issue direct orders to the camp commander, bypassing all other chain of command, in response to his own directives. Himmler would also occasionally receive broad instructions from Adolf Hitler, which he would then interpret as he saw fit and transmit to the Auschwitz Camp Commander.

Below Himmler, the most senior operational SS commander involved with Auschwitz was SS-Obergruppenführer Oswald Pohl, who served as head of the SS-Economics Main Office, known as the SS-Wirtschafts-Verwaltungshauptamt or SS-WVHA. Pohl's subordinate, SS-Gruppenführer Richard Glücks, served as the Amtschef (Department Chief) of the Concentration Camps Inspectorate which was known as "Department D" within the WVHA. It was Glücks who may be seen as the direct superior to the camp commandant of Auschwitz, SS-Obersturmbannführer Rudolf Höss.

In addition to this direct chain of command, the geographical location of Auschwitz placed some of its supply and wartime functions under the authority of Regional SS and Nazi Party leaders. When the camp was first constructed, Auschwitz was located within the borders of the newly established General Government, under the control of Reichsleiter Hans Frank. Before Auschwitz was a death camp, Frank left the running of the camp mostly to the SS, although he did know of the camp's existence since the early Auschwitz fell under his geographical authority. Simultaneously, all SS activities at Auschwitz were under the authority of the Higher SS and Police Leader "Ost" (east) who, during most of Auschwitz's existence, was Friedrich-Wilhelm Krüger (Wilhelm Koppe also held this position from late 1943 to early 1945). Krüger's subordinate, the SS and Police Leader of Kraków was also technically senior to the Commander of Auschwitz and could issue orders concerning wartime needs.

By 1942, the territory in which Auschwitz lay had been absorbed into the German state of Upper Silesia and thereafter was under geographical control of the corresponding Gauleiter. For most of the camp's later half of existence, this person was Karl Hanke, who both visited Auschwitz and had full knowledge of the camp's operation. During Hanke's tenure, the SS command of the region stayed the same, with the addition of Auschwitz now falling under the administrative realm of the Allgemeine-SS division SS-Oberabschnitt Südost. The 23rd SS-Standarte also was a General-SS counterpart to the Waffen-SS personnel of the region, many of whom were stationed at Auschwitz.

As well as falling under a direct and geographical chain of command, the nature of the work at Auschwitz also had the camp coming under the sphere of the Reichssicherheitshauptamt, or RSHA. Both Reinhard Heydrich and later Ernst Kaltenbrunner routinely were briefed on activities at Auschwitz through Adolf Eichmann, assigned head of RSHA Referat IV B4 (RSHA Sub-Department IV-B4), who dealt with supervising the transportation of Jews to Auschwitz. He visited the camp on several occasions.

A final group which had interest in Auschwitz were the various German ministries concerned with war production, slave labor, and manpower. During the Nuremberg trials, heavy emphasis was placed on the knowledge which the civil government of Nazi Germany had of Auschwitz, which was a primary source of labor for such major firms as IG Farben. Both Fritz Sauckel and Albert Speer were directly accused of having knowledge of Auschwitz, although both denied knowing the scope of the genocide program in place there.

Senior chain of command

- Reichsführer-SS Heinrich Himmler (Supreme Commander of the SS)
- SS-Obergruppenführer Oswald Pohl (Commander, SS-Wirtschafts-Verwaltungshauptamt)
- SS-Gruppenführer Richard Glücks (Concentration Camps Inspectorate)

Lateral senior commands

- SS-Obergruppenführer Friedrich-Wilhelm Krüger
- SS-Obergruppenführer Wilhelm Koppe
- SS-Oberführer Julian Scherner

== Camp leadership and personnel ==
The camp commander of Auschwitz, as well as the senior camp officers and non-commissioned officers, were all members of the SS-Totenkopfverbände, or SS-TV. Due to a 1941 personnel directive from the SS Personalhauptamt, members of the SS-TV were also considered full members of the Waffen-SS. Such personnel were further authorized to display the Death's Head Collar Patch, indicating full membership in both the SS-TV and Waffen-SS.

The Auschwitz Commandant was assigned a full-time administrative staff to which answered a primary adjutant as well as several other SS officers in charge of supply, finance, and other administrative needs. Auschwitz also maintained a motor pool as well as an arsenal from which all the SS personnel would draw weapons and ammunition, although several of the SS were known to purchase their own handguns and other weapons.

Administrative and supply SS personnel were assigned mostly to the camp headquarters at the Auschwitz I camp. Such personnel, many of whom were Waffen-SS members but not members of the SS-TV camp service, were usually "out of the way" of the more horrific activities of the camp. Oskar Gröning is one such well known Auschwitz clerk, who has appeared on several documentaries speaking about life in Auschwitz for the SS, and how living in the camp was in fact an enjoyable experience.

Garrison commanders

- SS-Obersturmbannführer Rudolf Höss (1940–1943/1944)
- SS-Obersturmbannführer Arthur Liebehenschel (1943–1944)
- SS-Sturmbannführer Richard Baer (1944–1945)

Senior adjutant officers

- SS-Hauptsturmführer Josef Kramer (Auschwitz I)
- SS-Hauptsturmführer Robert Mulka (Auschwitz I and II)

Junior adjutant officers

- SS-Obersturmführer Karl-Friedrich Höcker (Auschwitz I)

Headquarters staff

- SS-Hauptscharführer Detlef Nebbe (Head NCO, Commandant's Staff)

Pay office

- SS-Unterscharführer Oskar Gröning (Currency Exchange Clerk)

Post office

- SS-Sturmscharführer Robert Heider (Post Office NCO)

Legal office

- SS-Obersturmführer Wilhelm Bayer
- SS-Obersturmführer Heinrich Ganninger

Directors of administration

- SS-Obersturmbannführer Lukas Möckel

Camp administration main office

- SS-Unterscharführer Franz Romeikat (Administrative assistant)

Prisoner property office

- SS-Obersturmführer Theodor Kratzer (Property director)

Camp personnel department

- SS-Hauptscharführer Friedrich Schimpf (Personnel accommodation)
- SS-Oberscharführer Hans Zobisch (Personnel NCO)

Camp technical section

- SS-Scharführer Georg Engelschall (Technical section NCO)

Camp motor pool

- SS-Rottenführer Richard Böch

== Internal camp order ==
Internal camp order was under the authority of SS-TV members answering directly to the Camp Commander through officers known as Lagerführers. Each of the three main camps at Auschwitz was assigned a Lagerführer to which answered several SS-non-commissioned officers known as Rapportführers. The Rapportführer commanded several Blockführer who oversaw order within individual prisoner barracks. Assisting the SS with this task was a large collection of Kapos, who were trustee prisoners.

Camp labor section

- SS-Unterscharführer Heinrich Oppelt (Director of camp labor)
- SS-Unterscharführer Heinrich Schoppe (Labor service NCO)

Women's camp sub-section

- SS-Unterscharführer Richard Perschel (Women's camp labor director)
- SS-Unterscharführer Johann Ruiters (Women's camp labor administration)

== Camp guards ==
External camp security was under the authority of an SS unit known as the "Guard Battalion", or Wachbattalion. These guards manned watchtowers and patrolled the perimeter fences of the camp. During an emergency, such as a prisoner uprising, the Guard Battalion could be deployed within the camp. The Guard battalion was organized on military lines with a Battalion Commander, Company and Platoon Leaders, as well as non-commissioned officers and enlisted SS soldiers. Camp guards were either members of the SS-TV or Waffen-SS veterans rotated into the concentration camp system due to wounds in action or for some other administrative reason.

Ironically, contrary to the stereotypical image of the "Concentration Camp Guard", members of the Guard Battalion seldom, if ever, had direct contact with prisoners. Exceptions occurred due to prisoner escapes or uprisings, of which the 1944 Crematorium Revolt (depicted in the film The Grey Zone where the Guard Battalion enters and machine guns a crematorium) is one such example. On June 17, 2016, one of the last of the Auschwitz Guards, Reinhold Hanning (age 94) was convicted as an accessory to murder and sentenced to 5 years imprisonment.

Battalion Commanders

- SS-Sturmbannführer Max Gebhardt
- SS-Sturmbannführer Arthur Plorin

Guard Company Commanders

- SS-Sturmbannführer Otto Stoppel

Guard Platoon Leaders

- SS-Obersturmführer Josef Kollmer
- SS-Untersturmführer Otto Wolnek

Guard Battalion NCOs

- SS-Hauptscharführer Adolf Becker
- SS-Hauptscharführer Matthias Tannhausen
- SS-Oberscharführer Emanuel Glumbik
- SS-Oberscharführer Vinzent Klose

Guard Battalion Sentries

- SS-Unterscharführer Reinhold Hanning
- SS-Rottenführer Erich Dinges

The "rank and file" of the Guard Battalion consisted primarily of junior SS soldiers holding the rank of Schütze, Oberschütze, and Sturmmann.

Auschwitz Dog Squad

- SS-Obersturmführer Hans Merbach (Dog Squad Commander)

== Camp medical personnel ==
Auschwitz maintained its own medical corps, led by Eduard Wirths, whose doctors and medical personnel were from various backgrounds in the SS. The infamous Josef Mengele, for example, was a combat field doctor in the Waffen-SS before transferring to Auschwitz after being wounded in combat.

Office of the Garrison Physician

- SS-Sturmbannführer Eduard Wirths
- SS-Obersturmführer Franz von Bodmann

Medical administration section

- SS-Sturmbannführer Eduard Krebsbach (temporary assignment – served less than 2 months)

Medical staff officers

- SS-Hauptsturmführer Josef Mengele
- SS-Hauptsturmführer Alfred Trzebinski
- SS-Obersturmführer Franz Lucas
- SS-Untersturmführer Hans Wilhelm König

Civilian medical personnel

- Carl Clauberg (civilian physician)
- SS-Untersturmführer Walter Goebel (assistant to Clauberg)

Medical service staff

- SS-Oberscharführer Josef Klehr (senior medical staff NCO)
- SS-Unterscharführer Adolf Theuer (sanitary orderly)

Office of the Garrison Dentist

- SS-Sturmbannführer Raimond Ehrenberger

Staff Dentists

- SS-Obersturmführer Willi Schatz

Dental service staff

- SS-Untersturmführer Josef Simon (dental technician)

Camp Pharmacists

- SS-Sturmbannführer Victor Capesius

Pharmacy staff

- SS-Obersturmführer Gerhard Guber (pharmacist's assistant)

Camp Veterinarians

- SS-Sturmbannführer Ludwig Boehne
- SS-Hauptsturmführer Armand Langermann

Auschwitz Hygiene Institute

- SS-Untersturmführer Hans Münch (deputy hygiene director)

== Camp Gestapo command ==
The Gestapo maintained a large office at Auschwitz, staffed by uniformed Gestapo officers and personnel.

Political office directors

- SS-Untersturmführer Maximilian Grabner

Political office directorate

- SS-Hauptscharführer Helmut Westphal
- SS-Oberscharführer Josef Wietschorek
- SS-Unterscharführer Hermann Kirschner

Political records office

- SS-Untersturmführer Hans Stark (Death register)

Camp identification department

- SS-Hauptscharführer Bernhard Walter (ID Department NCO)
- SS-Rottenführer Ludwig Pach (Identification checks)

Camp interrogation department

- SS-Oberscharführer Klaus Dylewski (Lead interrogator)

Camp escape department

- SS-Oberscharführer Wilhelm Boger (Escape department NCO)

Camp Gestapo agents

- SS-Oberscharführer Josef Erber
- SS-Unterscharführer Perry Broad
- SS-Rottenführer Hans Hoffmann

== Personnel involved in genocide ==
SS personnel assigned to the gas chambers were technically under the same chain of command as other internal camp SS personnel, but in practice were segregated and worked and lived locally on site at the crematorium. In all, there were usually four SS personnel per gas chamber, led by a non-commissioned officer, who oversaw around one hundred Jewish prisoners (known as the Sonderkommando) forced to assist in the extermination process.

The actual delivery of the gas to the victims was always handled by the SS. This was accomplished by a special SS unit known as the "Hygiene Division" which would drive Zyklon B to the crematorium in an ambulance and then empty the canister into the gas chamber. The Hygiene Division was under the control of the Auschwitz Medical Corps, with the Zyklon B ordered and delivered through the camp supply system.

SS Crematoria Personnel

- SS-Hauptscharführer Erich Muhsfeldt
- SS-Rottenführer Karl Hölblinger

== Female camp personnel ==
Female personnel assigned to Auschwitz were considered members of the SS Women's Auxiliary and were known as SS-Helferin. Such women served in a variety of roles from secretaries, nurses, and (most notoriously) guards of female compounds within Auschwitz.
