= Therese Brandl =

Nazi concentration camp guard (1902–1948)

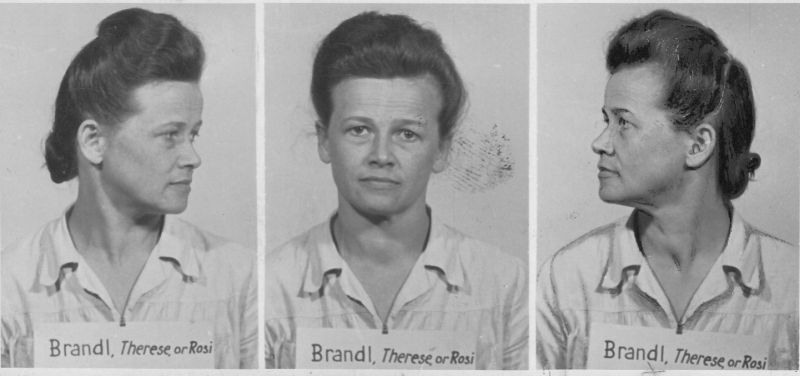
- Brandl at the time of her arrest (1945)
- Born: 1 February 1902; Staudach-Egerndach, Bavaria, erman Empire
- Died: 24 January 1948 (aged 45); Montelupich Prison, Kraków, Polish People's Republic
- Other names: Rose, Rosi
- Status: Executed by hanging
- Motive: Nazism
- Conviction: Crimes against humanity
- Trial: Auschwitz trial
- Penalty: Death

Therese Brandl (1 February 1902 – 24 January 1948) was a Nazi concentration camp guard.

In March 1942, Brandl was among the SS women assigned to Auschwitz I concentration camp. Her duties included watching over women in the sorting sheds and as the SS Rapportaufseherin. In October 1942, she was posted to the newly opened Auschwitz II extermination camp at Birkenau. Brandl was convicted of crimes against humanity after the war during the Auschwitz Trial in Kraków and executed.

== Career ==
Born in Staudach-Egerndach, Bavaria, Brandl was posted to Ravensbrück concentration camp in March 1940 to begin her training under SS-Oberaufseherin Johanna Langefeld. Sent to Auschwitz I during March 1942, Brandl was employed in the laundry and soon rose through the ranks and became an Erstaufseherin (First Guard) directly under Margot Dreschel and Maria Mandl. In July 1944, she received the War Merit Cross from the Reich for her "good conduct" in the camps.

She took part in selections of women and children to be murdered in the gas chambers as well as physically abusing prisoners, including children, as Andreas Larinciakos, a nine-year-old boy from Cles, Italy, recalled: "In November 1944, all children were transferred to Camp A, the gypsy camp. When they counted us, one was found missing, so Mandl, manageress of the women's camp and her assistant, Brandl, drove us out into the street at one in the morning and made us stand there in the frost until noon the next day".

In November 1944, with the approach of the Soviet Army, she was assigned to the Mühldorf concentration camp complex, subcamp of Dachau along with Mandl and was demoted to Aufseherin. Few reports have surfaced about Brandl's behavior at Mühldorf. She ultimately fled from Mühldorf on 27 April 1945, weeks before the arrival of the United States Army.

On 29 August 1945, the U.S. Army arrested her in the Bavarian mountains of Germany and sent her to a holding camp to await questioning. In November 1947, she was tried by the Polish authorities along with Mandl, Luise Danz, Hildegard Lächert, and Alice Orlowski at the Auschwitz Trial in Kraków. On 22 December 1947, Brandl was convicted of participating in the selection of inmates to be murdered. She was hanged in prison on 24 January 1948, about a week before her 46th birthday.

== See also ==
- Female guards in Nazi concentration camps
