= Hildegard Lächert =

German war criminal and Nazi concentration camp guard

- Born: 19 March 1920; Berlin, Weimar Republic
- Died: 14 April 1995 (aged 75); Berlin, Germany
- Status: Deceased
- Motive: Nazism
- Convictions: Poland; Crimes against humanity West Germany; Accessory to murder
- Penalty: Poland; 15 years imprisonment West Germany; 12 years imprisonment

Hildegard Martha Lächert (19 March 1920 – 14 April 1995) was a female guard, or Aufseherin, at several concentration camps controlled by Nazi Germany. She became publicly known for her service at Ravensbrück, Majdanek and Auschwitz-Birkenau.

== Early life ==
Lächert became a mother aged 18 and again aged 23, both children conceived in non-marital relationships.

== Camp service ==
In October 1942, at the age of 22, Lächert, a German nurse, was called to serve at Majdanek as an Aufseherin. During her time in Majdanek, Lächert was recalled as having been extremely brutal. Lächert was disciplined by her SS superiors at least three times, albeit all for administrative offensives. She spent five days in jail for violating a curfew, and another eight days in jail for losing her pistol.

In 1944, after the birth of her third child, Lächert served at Auschwitz concentration camp. She fled the camp in December 1944 ahead of the advancing Red Army. There are reports that her last overseeing jobs were at Bozen, a detention camp in northern Italy, and at the Mauthausen-Gusen concentration camp in Austria.

In July 1945, Lächert, whose crimes had not been discovered yet, returned to Berlin and worked in an American hospital until October, after which she returned to Austria to continue nursing. On 30 March 1946, Austrian police officers arrested Lächert since she had previously worked with the SS. She was transferred to British custody, and then extradited to Poland in December.

== Trial ==
In November 1947, the former member of the Schutzstaffel (SS) appeared in a Kraków, Poland courtroom, along with 40 other SS guards in the Auschwitz trial. Lächert sat next to three other former SS women, Alice Orlowski, Therese Brandl, and Luise Danz. Because of her war crimes in Auschwitz and Płaszów, the former guard and mother of two surviving children was given a sentence of 15 years in prison. Lächert was released from prison under an amnesty on 7 December 1956. Lächert subsequently received 6000 DM from the West German government as an alleged prisoner of war. After her release, Lächert briefly worked with the Federal Intelligence Service (BND), West German spy agency and the CIA, which at the time was routinely interviewing Nazi war criminals who had been released from prisons in Eastern Europe. Lächert's work with the agencies ended after only a few months since she was quickly deemed useless.

In August 1973, Lächert was arrested by West German officials, and questioned about her past in Majdanek, due to the upcoming third Majdanek Trial. Lächert was released, but then rearrested as a suspect in June 1979 and put on trial. The same year, she ran in the European Parliament election for Erwin Schönborn's far-right Aktionsgemeinschaft Nationales Europa in the European elections, placing 4th on the group's list.

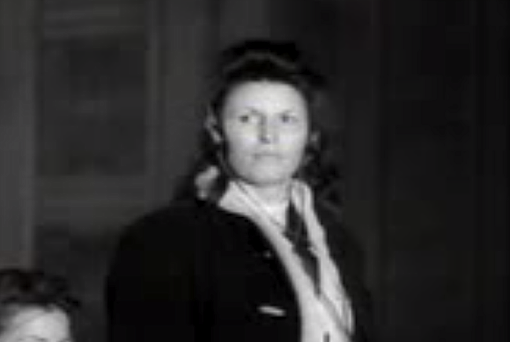
Lächert at her 1947 trial.

The testimonies heard concerning Lächert's sadistic behaviour were extensive and detailed. One former prisoner, Henryka Ostrowska, testified, "We always said blutige about the fact that she struck until blood showed," giving her the nickname "Bloody Brigitte" (Krwawa Brygida in Polish). Many other witnesses characterized her as the "worst of the worst" or "the most cruel" Aufseherin, as "Beast", and as "Fright of the Prisoners." Another survivor, Maria Kaufmann-Krasowski, testified that when Lächert assigned her to wash floors she beat her with a whip and referred to her as "a piece of filth." For her part in selections to the gas chamber, complicity to the murder of 1196 prisoners, releasing her dog onto pregnant inmates (in one example ‘targeting the most vulnerable parts of her body in an act of cruel desecration and killing of her unborn child’) and her overall abuse, the court sentenced her to 12 years imprisonment in the Majdanek trials. Prosecutors had requested a life sentence.

Lächert never had to serve this time, since her imprisonment in Poland and the time she spent in custody awaiting trial were allowed as time served. She died in 1995.
