= Anton Lechner =

SS officer (1907–1975)

- Born: 18 November 1907; Buchers, Austria-Hungary
- Died: 14 September 1975 (aged 67); Eppingen, West Germany
- Occupation: SS-Rottenführer
- Political party: Nazi Party
- Status: Deceased
- Conviction: Crimes against humanity
- Trial: Auschwitz Trial
- Penalty: Life imprisonment

Anton Lechner (18 November 1907 – 14 September 1975) was an SS-Rottenführer and member of staff at Auschwitz concentration camp. He was prosecuted at the Auschwitz Trial.

Lechner was born in Buchers in the Sudetenland. He was a citizen of Czechoslovakia until 1938. He held German citizenship after the annexation of the Sudetenland by the Third Reich. After primary school he became a coach-driver. He joined the Nazi Party and the SS in December 1939. In February 1941 he was assigned to Auschwitz, where he initially served as a guard, and then as a reserve vehicle driver from 1943 to 5 December 1944.

For his cruelty to prisoners on multiple occasions, Lechner was tried by the Supreme National Tribunal at the Auschwitz Trial in Kraków and was sentenced to life imprisonment on 22 December 1947. Due to an amnesty, however, Lechner was released from prison on 19 December 1959. He died in September 1975.

== Bibliography ==
- Cyprian T., Sawicki J., Siedem wyroków Najwyższego Trybunału Narodowego, Poznań 1962
