= August Bogusch =

German SS officer (1890–1948)

- Born: 5 August 1890; Lubliniec, Upper Silesia, German Empire
- Died: 24 January 1948 (aged 57); Montelupich Prison, Kraków, Polish People's Republic
- Occupation: SS-Scharführer
- Political party: National Socialist German Workers' Party (NSDAP)
- Status: Executed by hanging
- Motive: Nazism
- Conviction: Crimes against humanity
- Trial: Auschwitz trial
- Penalty: Death

August Raimond Bogusch (5 August 1890 – 24 January 1948) was an SS-Scharführer and member of staff at Auschwitz concentration camp. He was prosecuted at the Auschwitz Trial, sentenced to death and hanged.

== Life ==
Bogusch was born in Lubliniec, Upper Silesia. He joined the Nazi Party in October 1932 and the SS in April 1933 (number 51922). On 21 August 1939 he was drafted into the SS-Totenkopfverbände and was posted to Buchenwald concentration camp. He was at Auschwitz from 27 January 1941 to 18 January 1945, where he was - among other things - a Schutzhaftlagerführer (protective custody) guard and a Blockführer (block leader). After the evacuation of Auschwitz he was sent to Mysen concentration camp near Oslo, and in February 1945, was transferred back to Buchenwald. He was also deployed to Mauthausen-Gusen concentration camp.

In the summer of 1943, Bogusch participated in the extermination process, where he selected Jews from arriving transports to the gas chambers. During the occupation of Poland, the Polish underground declared on London radio that he would be punished by death.

=== After the war ===
Bogusch was captured by the Allies and released to the Polish authorities. He was tried by the Supreme National Tribunal in Kraków and sentenced to death. His sentence was carried out by hanging in Montelupich Prison, Kraków.
