= Johannes Weber =

- Born: March 23, 1902; Wörblitz, German Empire
- Died: October 11, 1949 (aged 47); Polish People's Republic
- Occupation: SS-Sturmmann
- Political party: Nazi Party
- Status: Deceased
- Conviction: Crimes against humanity
- Trial: Auschwitz Trial
- Penalty: 15 years imprisonment

Johannes Weber (March 23, 1902 – October 11, 1949) was an SS-Sturmmann and member of staff in Auschwitz concentration camp. He was prosecuted at the Auschwitz Trial.

Weber was born in Wörblitz. He worked as a farmer and a miller. He joined the SS on July 15, 1942, and was assigned to Auschwitz. From November 1942, Weber worked as a chef in the kitchen at Birkenau, initially at the women's camp, then at the men's. On some occasions, he abused prisoners who came into the kitchen for food, particularly gypsies, whom he called "black Jews".

Weber was tried by the Supreme National Tribunal at the Auschwitz Trial in Kraków and was sentenced to 15 years in prison. He died in prison in 1949.

== Bibliography ==
- Cyprian T., Sawicki J., Siedem wyroków Najwyższego Trybunału Narodowego, Poznań 1962
