= Paul Götze =

Nazi concentration camp guard

- Paul Götze
- Born: 13 November 1903; Halle, German Empire
- Died: 24 January 1948 (aged 44); Montelupich Prison, Kraków, Polish People's Republic
- Occupation: SS-Rottenführer
- Political party: Nazi Party
- Status: Executed by hanging
- Motive: Nazism
- Conviction: Crimes against humanity
- Trial: Auschwitz trial
- Penalty: Death

Paul Götze (13 November 1903 – 24 January 1948) was an SS-Rottenführer at Auschwitz and Buchenwald concentration camps.

Born in Halle, German Empire, Götze was a painter by profession. He joined the Nazi Party in 1937 and the SS in 1942. In July 1942 he was posted to Auschwitz, where he initially served as a guard and supervisor of work groups. From February to May 1943 he was Blockführer in the Auschwitz main camp, later performing the same function in the gypsy camp in Birkenau from May 1943 to August 1944. In August 1944 he was transferred to Buchenwald.

Although prisoners held Götze as a reasonable man out of SS men at the camp, he took an active part in the killing of Jews and prisoners unable to work in the Birkenau gas chambers, such as assisting with the loading and unloading of people marked for gassing when large numbers of people were marked for extermination. He participated in the liquidation of the gypsy camp in August 1944.

Götze was tried by the Supreme National Tribunal at the Auschwitz Trial in Kraków and was sentenced to death. His sentence was carried out by hanging in Montelupich Prison, Kraków.

== Bibliography ==
- Cyprian T., Sawicki J., Siedem wyroków Najwyższego Trybunału Narodowego, Poznań 1962
