= Richard Schröder =

- Richard Schröder
- Born: 14 April 1921; Hamburg, Weimar Republic
- Occupation: SS-Unterscharführer
- Political party: National Socialist German Workers' Party (NSDAP)
- Motive: Nazism
- Conviction: Crimes against humanity
- Trial: Auschwitz trial
- Penalty: 10 years imprisonment

Richard Schröder (born 14 April 1921) was an SS-Unterscharführer and member of staff at Auschwitz concentration camp. He was prosecuted at the Auschwitz Trial.

Born in Hamburg, Schröder completed trade school to work as a freight forwarder. He joined the Hitler Youth on 1 October 1933, the Nazi Party on 1 December 1939 and the SS on 30 May 1940. He was assigned to Auschwitz in December 1940, where he worked as an accounting officer until January 1945. Because he had only clerical duties, he had no contact with prisoners. Schröder was tried by the Supreme National Tribunal in Kraków and convicted of being part of a criminal organisation (the SS and Auschwitz staff). He received a 10-year prison sentence, but was released in the mid-1950s under an amnesty.
