= Alexander Bülow =

- Alexander Bülow
- Born: 28 April 1905; Andrzejowska, Warsaw, Congress Poland
- Occupation: SS-Sturmmann
- Political party: National Socialist German Workers' Party (NSDAP)
- Status: Deceased
- Motive: Nazism
- Conviction: Crimes against humanity
- Trial: Auschwitz trial
- Penalty: 15 years imprisonment

Alexander Bülow (born 28 April 1905, date of death unknown) was an SS-Sturmmann and member of staff at Auschwitz concentration camp. He was prosecuted at the Auschwitz Trial.

Bülow was born in Andriówka. A farm worker, he was unable to read or write, until he joined the SS in November 1941. He worked at Auschwitz from then until January 1945 as a guard and escort, in particular at the subcamps of Auschwitz at Rajsko, Babice, and Budy.

Bülow was cruel to prisoners. He was tried by the Supreme National Tribunal at the Auschwitz Trial in Kraków and was sentenced to 15 years in prison. Due to an amnesty, he was released from prison in 1956.
