= Karl Möckel =

German Nazi colonel (1901–1948)

- Born: 9 January 1901; Klingenthal, German Empire
- Died: 24 January 1948 (aged 47); Montelupich Prison, Polish People's Republic
- Occupation: SS-Obersturmbannführer
- Known for: Head of Department IV (Administration) at Auschwitz
- Political party: Nazi Party
- Status: Executed by hanging
- Motive: Nazism
- Conviction: Crimes against humanity
- Trial: Auschwitz trial
- Penalty: Death

Karl Ernst Möckel (9 January 1901 – 24 January 1948) was an SS-Obersturmbannführer (Lieutenant Colonel) and administrator at Auschwitz concentration camp. He was executed as a war criminal.

== Life ==
Möckel was born in Klingenthal, Germany where, after secondary school, he worked as an accountant. In 1926, he joined the Nazi Party and the Schutzstaffel. From 1933 - 1941, he worked in the main offices of the SS, including the SS-Wirtschafts-Verwaltungshauptamt (WVHA). In 1941, he joined the Waffen-SS, the SS combat arm, and served in a reserve battalion. In Spring 1943, he arrived at Auschwitz taking over as the head of the administration of the camp.

=== At Auschwitz ===
Möckel remained at the camp until its evacuation in January 1945. As head of Department IV (Administration), he was responsible for the acquisition and distribution of food and clothing and the management of prisoners' property. In addition, Department IV encompassed the management of the property confiscated from exterminated prisoners, as well as building maintenance, which included the servicing of the crematoria and gas chambers, and thus Möckel's responsibilities also facilitated the perpetration of the Holocaust.

Due to the sheer volume of money and valuables (mainly jewellery and watches made from precious metals) confiscated from prisoners, SS men struggled to keep up with the task of inspecting, sorting and counting them. Möckel stated that fifteen to twenty suitcases of valuables were sent to the WVHA quarterly.

=== Trial ===
Möckel was tried by the Supreme National Tribunal in Kraków and sentenced to death. His sentence was carried out by hanging in Montelupich Prison, Kraków on 24 January 1948.

At the rank of SS-Obersturmbannführer (Lt. Colonel, the rank also held by Rudolf Höss), Möckel was the joint-highest ranking individual to be prosecuted at the Auschwitz Trial. (The other being a commandant of the Auschwitz main camp, Arthur Liebehenschel.)

== Bibliography ==
Notes

References

- Tadeusz Cyprian; Jerzy Sawicki. Siedem wyroków Najwyższego Trybunału Narodowego (in Polish) (1962 ed.). Instytut Zachodni. p. 383. OCLC 11797830.
- Rudolf Höss (1989). Autobiografia Rudolfa Hössa, komendanta obozu oświęcimskiego (in Polish) (1989 ed.). Wydawn. Prawnicze. p. 366. ISBN 83-219-0481-5.
- Świebocki, Henryk. Iwaszko, Tadeusz. Długoborski, Wacław. Piper, Franciszek. Lasik, Aleksander. Brand, William (2000). Auschwitz 1940–1945: Central issues in the history of the camp (2000 ed.). Auschwitz-Birkenau State Museum. p. 452. ISBN 83-85047-87-5.
- Gábor Kádár; Zoltán Vági (January 2004). Self-financing genocide: the gold train, the Becher case and the wealth of Hungarian Jews (2004 ed.). Central European University Press. p. 413. ISBN 963-9241-53-9.
