= Hans Koch (SS officer) =

German WWII war criminal

- Hans Koch
- Born: August 13, 1912; Tangerhütte, German Empire
- Died: July 14, 1955 (aged 42); Gdańsk, Polish People's Republic
- Occupation: SS-Unterscharführer
- Political party: Nazi Party
- Status: Deceased
- Motive: Nazism
- Conviction: Crimes against humanity
- Trial: Auschwitz trial
- Penalty: Life imprisonment

Hans Koch (August 13, 1912 – July 14, 1955) was an SS-Unterscharführer and member of staff at Auschwitz concentration camp. He was prosecuted at the Auschwitz Trial.

Koch was born in Tangerhütte, German Empire. He worked as a laboratory assistant. He joined the Nazi Party in 1937. A member of the SS, he was at Auschwitz from 1940 to 1945. On the basis of his professional background, he worked in the medical department dealing with disinfection. One of his responsibilities (along with SS-Oberscharführer Josef Klehr among others) was to insert the Zyklon B into the gas chambers. Koch later said that after participating in a gassing, he was unable to sleep without drinking large quantities of alcohol beforehand. During the Frankfurt Auschwitz trials in the 1960s, Edward Pys, a survivor of Auschwitz, recounted a gassing done by Koch.

"When Koch and Theuer began filling the gas tank, the engine of a car parked in front of the crematorium was started and ran at full speed for about a quarter of an hour. Although the crematorium was almost airtight, the noise of the engines could not drown out the screams of the people in the gas room. I heard almost animal screams that no longer had anything human about them. If I hadn't known that there were people in the crematorium, I would never have believed that those screams were made by people. These terrible screams lasted a few minutes."

Pys also said, "Since I know German very well, I often heard Koch complain to his friends that he had had a very busy night, because he had to gas a large number of prisoners at the Birkenau crematoria."

After the war, Koch was arrested by U.S. authorities in Allied-occupied Germany, after which he was extradited to Poland on May 3, 1947. He was tried by the Supreme National Tribunal at the Auschwitz Trial in Kraków and was found guilty of perpetrating the genocide of the Jews. However, the court sentenced him to life imprisonment as opposed to death, citing the orders given to him as attenuating circumstances. He died in prison in Gdańsk in 1955.

It was noted that unlike many of his codefendants, Koch did not go out of his way to torture and kill prisoners, which was presumably why he was spared execution. During sentencing, the court said that those who received death sentences had gone beyond what their orders had called for. In the view of the court, this meant they were sadists who enjoyed what they were doing, and thus deserved no mercy in return.

== Bibliography ==
- Cyprian T., Sawicki J., Siedem wyroków Najwyższego Trybunału Narodowego, Poznań 1962
- Świebocki, Henryk., Iwaszko, Tadeusz., Długoborski, Wacław., Piper, Franciszek., Lasik, Aleksander., Brand, William.,: Auschwitz, 1940-1945: central issues in the history of the camp, Auschwitz-Birkenau State Museum, 2000, ISBN 83-85047-87-5
