= Ludwig Plagge =

SS officer (1910–1948)

- Ludwig Plagge
- Born: 13 January 1910; Landesbergen, German Empire
- Died: 24 January 1948 (aged 38); Montelupich Prison, Kraków, Polish People's Republic
- Occupation: SS-Oberscharführer
- Political party: Nazi Party
- Status: Executed by hanging
- Motive: Nazism
- Conviction: Crimes against humanity
- Trial: Auschwitz trial
- Penalty: Death

Ludwig Plagge (13 January 1910 – 24 January 1948) was an SS-Oberscharführer and member of staff at Auschwitz, Buchenwald, Sachsenhausen, and Majdanek concentration camps. He was prosecuted at the Auschwitz Trial, and executed for war crimes.

== Life ==
Born in Landesbergen, Plagge completed eight years of school and became a farmer. He joined the Nazi party on 1 December 1931, and the SS in October 1934, with the membership number 270620. On 20 November 1939 he began active service and was assigned to Sachsenhausen concentration camp where he stayed until the end of June 1940. He was subsequently posted to Auschwitz in July 1940, and was one of the first SS men there.

He remained there until 4 October 1943. His roles included Blockführer (Block leader) (including in Block 11, the death block) and SS Rapportführer. In the gypsy camp in Birkenau he had the role of deputy roll call leader from its opening through autumn 1943, and in the summer was also acting protective custody leader (Schutzhaftlagerführer). From Auschwitz he was posted to the Majdanek camp in Lublin, then in 1944 he was in Flossenbürg concentration camp. From 19 March to 23 April 1945 he was the senior command leader of the Regensburg subcamp of Flossenbürg. He was also a member of Lebensborn.

Plagge was noted for his brutality, particularly to Jews. He participated in the gassing of thousands of Sinti and Roma people, and Jews from Theresienstadt.

He was known for submitting prisoners to punishment in the form of physical exercises, known as "sport" in the camp. Prisoners in quarantine were also made to do these exercises. On demand, a group of prisoners were expected to undertake any action, such as walking, singing, running, crawling on one's elbows and tips of the toes, roll around on the ground covered with gravel and crushed bricks, etc. Plagge was a specialist in the invention of these exercises, which were to be performed very quickly without any regard to the age and health of the prisoners. He would make prisoners run for hours while carrying his pipe between his teeth, and hit those who fell, forcing them to carry on. Prisoners nicknamed him das Pfeifchen (the little pipe).

== Trial ==
Plagge was prosecuted by the Supreme National Tribunal at the Auschwitz Trial in Kraków. During the trial he admitted to only beating prisoners. Hoping his life would be spared, he told the court that after atonement for his crimes, he will be regarded as a good man, but was sentenced to death due to the overwhelming evidence against him. He was executed on 24 January 1948 by hanging in Montelupich Prison, Kraków.

== Bibliography ==
- Cyprian T., Sawicki J., Siedem wyroków Najwyższego Trybunału Narodowego, Poznań 1962
- Klee E., Das Personenlexikon zum Dritten Reich: Wer war was vor und nach 1945. Fischer-Taschenbuch-Verlag, Frankfurt am Mein 2005
- Winter, Walter Stanoski., Robertson, Struan. Winter time: memoirs of a German Sinto who survived Auschwitz. University of Hertfordshire Press, 2004, ISBN 1-902806-38-7
- International Dachau Committee, Dachauer Hefte – Konzentrationslager – Lebenswelt und Umfeld. Verlag Dachauer Hefte, Volume 12, 1996.
- Świebocki, Henryk. London wurde informiert--: Berichte von Auschwitz-Flüchtlingen. University of Michigan, published by Auschwitz-Birkenau State Museum, 1997, ISBN 83-85047-64-6
- Buszko, Józef. Auschwitz, camp hitlérien d'extermination, Indiana University, published by Editions Interpress, 1986, 2nd edition.
