= Sanitätswesen =

Nazi Germany military division

The Sanitätswesen ("medical corps") was one of the five divisions of a Nazi concentration or extermination camp organization during the Holocaust. The other divisions were the command center, the administration department, the Politische Abteilung and the protective detention camp.

== Background ==
The medical corps was an obligatory component of the command center staff of a concentration camp. This division was subordinate to the chief physician of the Concentration Camps Inspectorate (CCI), called after 1937, the Leitender Artzt ("head doctor"). The chief physician of the CCI was responsible for assigning and posting "medical personnel" to the concentration camps, for technical instructions to the camp doctors and for evaluation of their monthly reports.

Later, the CCI became "Amt D" of the SS-Wirtschafts-Verwaltungshauptamt and Enno Lolling became head on March 3, 1942, of "Amt D III for Medical Corps Units and Camp Hygiene" with headquarters in Oranienburg. As such, he was the head doctor supervising all concentration camp doctors, who was, in turn, subordinate to the Reichsarzt SS, Ernst-Robert Grawitz.

== Chief physician ==
The Standortarzt ("Garrison Doctor"), the chief camp physician, also called "first camp doctor", ran the medical corps at the concentration camp. In this capacity, the leading doctor was the supervisor of the entire medical staff of the camp. He was also responsible for carrying out the instructions of the chief physician of the CCI and the preparation of monthly reports to them.

== Troops doctor ==
The "troops doctor" was responsible for the medical care of the SS-guards and their family members.

== Camp doctors ==
The rest of the camp doctors divided up the remaining areas of the camp (men's camp, women's camp, etc.), according to the duty roster. The medical care of prisoners was secondary to their main tasks. Of primary importance were the hygienic aspects of disease prevention and maintenance of prisoners' capacity to work. To this end, they availed themselves of prisoners who were doctors and nurses to serve as auxiliary staff in the infirmary.

According to Auschwitz concentration camp commandant Rudolf Höss, their non-medical tasks were:

1. They were to be present at the arrival of Jewish transports to conduct selections of those men and women able to work.
2. They were to be at the gas chambers to observe the killing procedures and verify that everyone was dead.
3. Zahnärzte ("Dentists") had to conduct continual spot tests to verify that the prisoner dentists from the Sonderkommando removed all gold from the mouths of the dead before they were incinerated in the crematorium and had placed the gold in the secure containers on hand for that purpose. They also had to supervise the gold being melted afterward.
4. They were to "retire" and send to be exterminated those Jews who had become incapacitated and for whom the prognosis did not anticipate a return to work within four weeks. Those who couldn't get out of bed were to be killed with an injection.
5. They had to conduct verschleierten Exekutionen ("covert executions") of healthy prisoners arrested by the Politische Abteilung who had been sentenced to death for political reasons. These were "liquidated" by injection. The camp Gestapo wanted the executions to be kept secret, hence the doctors certified the cause of death as being from "natural causes".
6. Attendance at "judicial" camp executions was required to certify death.
7. They had to be attend the corporal punishment of prisoners in order to examine the prisoner serve as an impediment.
8. They had to conduct forced abortions on non-German women, up to the fifth month.

Moreover, the doctors had the opportunity, and in some cases, were assigned, to conduct "medical research". These experiments were conducted on living prisoners or sometimes on prisoners who were executed for the purposes of the particular research project. Along with this were manifold relationships throughout the German Reich with National Socialist professors at medical faculties and institutions, such as the Kaiser Wilhelm Institute (now the Max Planck Institute), also the pharmaceutical industry and medical organizations.

When the local registrar's office required a death certificate for one of these dead prisoners, it was falsified with regard to doctor's name and cause of death.

== SS medics ==
The camp doctors were allocated SS medics as ancillary staff, who served as nurses in the infirmary. These medics often had little or no nursing training and as a result, possessed only limited medical knowledge.

== Prisoner doctors and nurses ==
The direct care and treatment of sick prisoners was mainly by prisoners who had been doctors and nurses before their arrest. At times, their medical work was performed "illegally", in disobedience of a direct order from the SS.

== Other medical staff ==
On occasion, there was also an SS pharmacist.

== After 1945 ==
Though a number of the most important Nazi doctors were tried in Nuremberg and some were executed, many Nazi doctors slipped into comfortable and respected positions after the war. For example, in East Germany, Hermann Voss became a prominent anatomist and in West Germany, Eugen Wannenmacher became a professor at the University of Münster and Otmar Freiherr von Verschuer, who had been Josef Mengele's mentor and sponsor, was allowed to continue his medical practice. Their Nazi past was generally ignored, though some were forced to work under false names. The experiments they conducted have been cited in medical journals and sometimes republished with no reference or disclaimer as to how the research data were obtained.

== See also ==
- Henryk Mandelbaum
- Josef Klehr
- Adolf Theuer
- Hans Koch

== Sources ==
- Karin Orth, Die Konzentrationslager-SS. dtv, Munich (2004) ISBN 3-423-34085-1 (in German)
- Wolfgang Kirsten, Das Konzentrationslager als Institution totalen Terrors. Centaurus, Pfaffenweiler (1992) ISBN 3-89085-649-7 (in German)
- Hermann Langbein, Menschen in Auschwitz. Frankfurt am Main, Berlin Wien, Ullstein-Verlag (1980) ISBN 3-548-33014-2 (in German)
- Eugen Kogon, Der SS-Staat. Das System der deutschen Konzentrationslager, Alber, Munich (1946); later, Heyne, Munich (1995) ISBN 3-453-02978-X (in German)
