= Karl Jeschke =

- Born: August 17, 1890; Hohenliebenthal
- Died: After 1947
- Occupation: SS-Oberscharführer
- Political party: National Socialist German Workers' Party (NSDAP)
- Status: Deceased
- Motive: Nazism
- Conviction: Crimes against humanity
- Trial: Auschwitz trial
- Penalty: 3 years imprisonment

Karl Hermann Jeschke (born August 17, 1890, date of death unknown) was an SS-Oberscharführer and member of staff at Auschwitz concentration camp. He was prosecuted at the Auschwitz Trial.

Jeschke was born in Hohenliebenthal. He joined the Nazi Party in 1933. He served in the Wehrmacht fighting on the front until 1944. In July 1944 he was drafted into the Waffen-SS and sent to Auschwitz, where he worked as a guard. In mid-September 1944 he was transferred to the Charlottengrube subcamp.

After World War II, Jeschke was tried by the Supreme National Tribunal in Kraków. He received a three-year prison sentence. His subsequent whereabouts are unknown.

== Bibliography ==
- Cyprian T., Sawicki J., Siedem wyroków Najwyższego Trybunału Narodowego, Poznań 1962
