= Eduard Lorenz =

Auschwitz Trial defendant

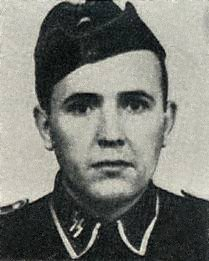
- Eduard Lorenz
- Born: 12 February 1921; Czechoslovakia
- Occupation: SS-Unterscharführer
- Political party: National Socialist German Workers' Party (NSDAP)
- Motive: Nazism
- Conviction: Crimes against humanity
- Trial: Auschwitz trial
- Penalty: 15 years imprisonment

Eduard Lorenz (born 12 February 1921) was an SS-Unterscharführer (Corporal) and member of staff at Auschwitz concentration camp. He was prosecuted at the Auschwitz Trial.

Lorenz was German by nationality with Czechoslovak citizenship. He was a farmer. After the invasion of Czechoslovakia by the Third Reich, he joined the SS and was sent to the front. Due to injury, he was unfit for further frontline service and was dispatched to Auschwitz at the end of January 1942. In August 1942, he worked as a guard, and then worked as a driver distributing food in the camp.

Lorenz was tried by the Supreme National Tribunal in Kraków and received a 15-year prison sentence for abusing prisoners. He was acquitted of murder. Due to an amnesty, he was released from prison early, on 18 December 1955.

== Bibliography ==
- Cyprian T., Sawicki J., Siedem wyroków Najwyższego Trybunału Narodowego, Poznań 1962
