= Detlef Nebbe =

SS-Hauptscharführer and member of staff at Auschwitz (1912–1972)

- Detlef Nebbe
- Born: 20 June 1912; Husum German Empire
- Died: 17 April 1972 (aged 59); Kiel, West Germany
- Occupation: SS-Hauptscharführer
- Political party: National Socialist German Workers' Party (NSDAP)
- Status: Deceased
- Motive: Nazism
- Conviction: Crimes against humanity
- Trial: Auschwitz trial
- Penalty: Life imprisonment

Detlef Nebbe (also Detleff; 20 June 1912 – 17 April 1972) was an SS-Hauptscharführer and member of staff at Auschwitz concentration camp. He was prosecuted at the Auschwitz trial.

Born in Husum, German Empire, in June 1912, Nebbe completed seven years of primary school, becoming a salesman by trade. He joined the SS in 1933 and the Nazi Party in 1937. On 15 September 1939 he was drafted into the Waffen-SS. On 15 October 1940 he was assigned to Auschwitz, where he remained until April 1944. In February 1941 he served as a sergeant in the guard company. An intimidating figure among SS men in his company, he was renowned as a devout Nazi, and would abuse prisoners by beating them defiantly. He also demonstrated to his colleagues how to behave towards prisoners. For his service, he was awarded the War Merit Cross Second Class with Swords.

Nebbe was tried by the Supreme National Tribunal at the Auschwitz trial in Kraków for his role at the camp, and was sentenced to life imprisonment for his crimes. Due to an amnesty, he was released from prison on 23 October 1956.

== Bibliography ==
- Cyprian T., Sawicki J., Siedem wyroków Najwyższego Trybunału Narodowego, Poznań 1962
