= Bolatice =

- Municipality
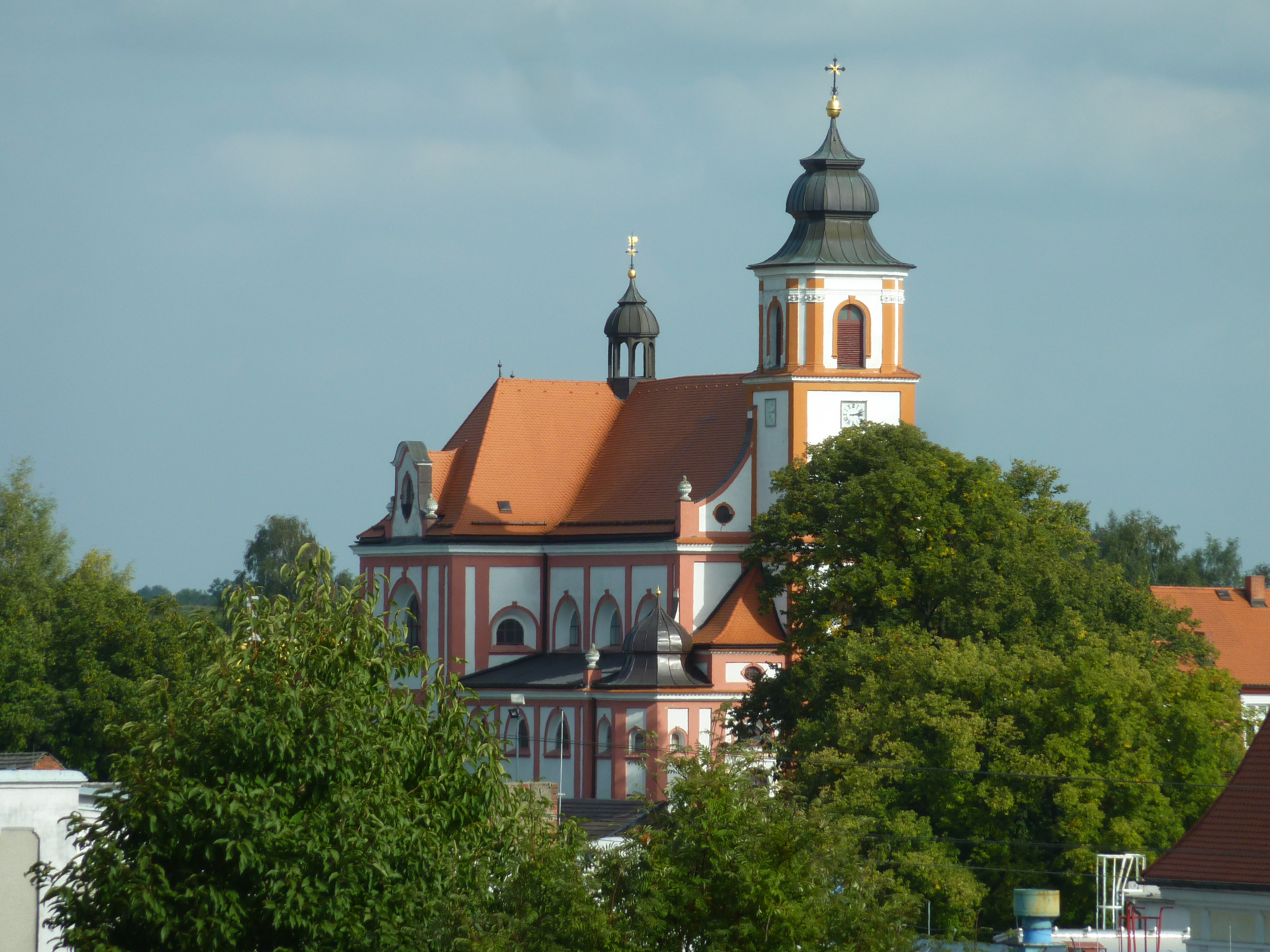
- Church of Saint Stanislaus

- Flag Coat of arms

- Location in the Czech Republic
- Coordinates: 49°57′6″N 18°5′1″E
- Country: Czech Republic
- Region: Moravian-Silesian
- District: Opava
- First mentioned: 1250

Area
  - Total: 13.24 km^{2} (5.11 sq mi)
- Elevation: 254 m (833 ft)

Population (2026-01-01)
  - Total: 4,508
  - Density: 340.5/km^{2} (881.8/sq mi)
- Time zone: UTC+1 (CET)
  - Summer (DST): UTC+2 (CEST)
- Postal code: 747 23
- Website: www.bolatice.cz

Bolatice (Czech pronunciation: [ˈbolacɪtsɛ]; German: Bolatitz, Polish: Bolacice) is a municipality and village in Opava District in the Moravian-Silesian Region of the Czech Republic. It has about 4,500 inhabitants. It is part of the historic Hlučín Region.

== Administrative division ==
Bolatice consists of two municipal parts (in brackets population according to the 2021 census):

- Bolatice (3,689)
- Borová (685)

== Geography ==
Bolatice is located about 12 kilometres (7 mi) east of Opava and 15 km (9 mi) northwest of Ostrava. It lies in the Opava Hilly Land. The highest point is at 309 m (1,014 ft) above sea level.

== History ==
The first written mention of Bolatice is in a letter of Pope Innocent IV from 1250. From 1742, after Empress Maria Theresa had been defeated, the village belonged to Prussia. The Prussian state sold Bolatice to Henn of Henneberg brothers in 1784. The new owners founded a new hamlet called Heneberky nearby in 1786. Heneberky was joined to Bolatice in 1893 and renamed Borová in 1949.

== Demographics ==
Historical population

| Year | Pop. | ±% |
|---|---|---|
| 1869 | 1,741 | — |
| 1880 | 1,811 | +4.0% |
| 1890 | 1,915 | +5.7% |
| 1900 | 2,101 | +9.7% |
| 1910 | 2,140 | +1.9% |

| Year | Pop. | ±% |
|---|---|---|
| 1921 | 2,375 | +11.0% |
| 1930 | 2,487 | +4.7% |
| 1950 | 2,495 | +0.3% |
| 1961 | 3,256 | +30.5% |
| 1970 | 3,398 | +4.4% |

| Year | Pop. | ±% |
|---|---|---|
| 1980 | 3,892 | +14.5% |
| 1991 | 4,177 | +7.3% |
| 2001 | 4,134 | −1.0% |
| 2011 | 4,341 | +5.0% |
| 2021 | 4,374 | +0.8% |

Source: Censuses

== Transport ==
Bolatice is located on a short railway line of local importance Kravaře–Chuchelná.

== Sights ==
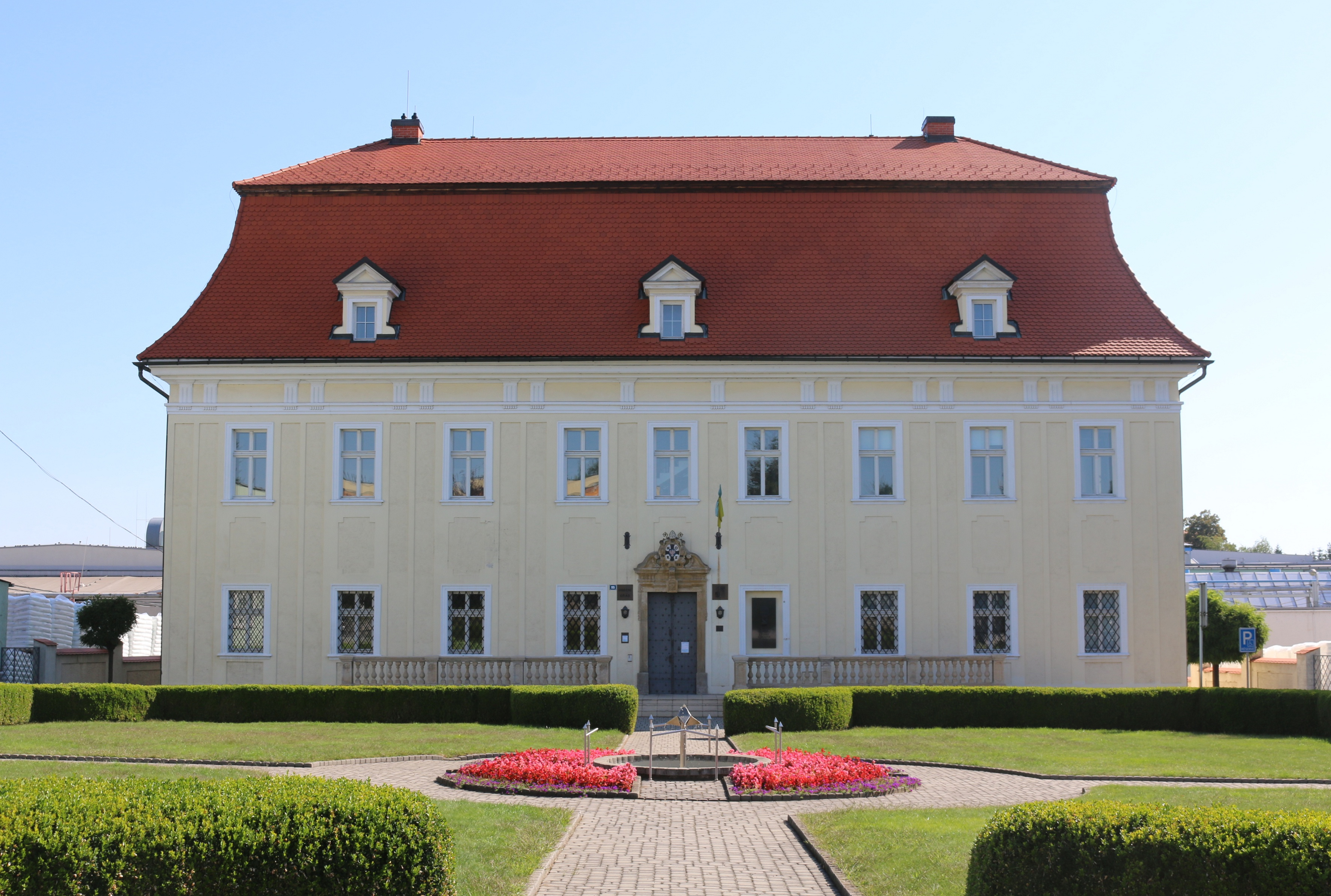
Bolatice Castle

The Church of Saint Stanislaus belongs to the main landmarks of Bolatice. It is a large church, built in 1703 and extended in 1911–1912.

The Bolatice Castle was built in the Baroque style in 1724–1748. Today it houses the municipal office.

In 2002, the Open-air Museum of Folk Traditions and Crafts was built by the citizens of Bolatice, who donated most of the exhibits to the museum. The museum presents the life and equipment of a traditional rural house in the 19th and early 20th centuries.

== Notable people ==
- Adolf Theuer (1920–1947), SS officer at Auschwitz concentration camp executed for war crimes

== Twin towns – sister cities ==
Bolatice is twinned with:

- Doľany, Slovakia
- Kysucký Lieskovec, Slovakia
- Linum (Fehrbellin), Germany
- Nagykovácsi, Hungary
- Rudy (Kuźnia Raciborska), Poland

Bolatice also has friendly relations with Slaný in the Czech Republic.
