= The Grey Zone =

2001 film directed by Tim Blake Nelson

- Theatrical release poster
- Directed by: Tim Blake Nelson
- Written by: Tim Blake Nelson
- Based on: Auschwitz: a Doctor's Eyewitness Account by Miklós Nyiszli and The Grey Zone by Tim Blake Nelson
- Produced by: Avi Lerner; Danny Lerner; Pamela Koffler; Christine Vachon; Tim Blake Nelson
- Starring: David Arquette; Steve Buscemi; Harvey Keitel; Mira Sorvino; Allan Corduner; Daniel Benzali; Natasha Lyonne
- Cinematography: Russell Lee Fine
- Edited by: Michelle Botticelli; Tim Blake Nelson
- Music by: Jeff Danna
- Production companies: Millennium Films; The Goatsingers; Killer Films
- Distributed by: Lions Gate Films
- Release dates: September 13, 2001 (TIFF); October 18, 2002 (United States)
- Running time: 108 minutes
- Country: United States
- Language: English
- Box office: $517,872

The Grey Zone is a 2001 American historical tragedy film written and directed by Tim Blake Nelson and starring David Arquette, Steve Buscemi, Harvey Keitel, Mira Sorvino, and Daniel Benzali. It is based on the book Auschwitz: A Doctor's Eyewitness Account written by Miklós Nyiszli.

The title comes from a chapter in the book The Drowned and the Saved by Holocaust survivor Primo Levi. The film tells the story of the Jewish Sonderkommando XII in Auschwitz in October 1944. These prisoners were made to assist the camp's guards in shepherding their victims to the gas chambers and then disposing of their bodies in the ovens.

== Plot ==
In October 1944, in the Auschwitz-Birkenau extermination camp, a small group of a Sonderkommando—prisoners assigned to dispose of the bodies of the dead—are plotting an insurrection that they hope will destroy at least one of the camp's four crematoria and gas chambers. They are receiving firearms from Polish citizens in the nearby village and gunpowder from the UNIO munitions factory; the female prisoners who work in the UNIO are smuggling the powder to the men's camp amid the bodies of their dead workers. When the women's activity is discovered by the Germans they are savagely tortured but they don't reveal the plot. A Hungarian-Jewish doctor, Miklós Nyiszli, who works for the Nazi doctor, Josef Mengele, in an experimental medical lab, has received permission from Mengele to visit his wife and daughter in the women's labor camp. Nyiszli is concerned about the safety of his family and believes that Mengele's orders will keep them from the gas chambers.

A new trainload of Hungarian Jewish prisoners arrives and are sent to the gas chambers. As the group is given instructions about "delousing", a fearful, angry man in the group begins shouting questions at one of the Sonderkommandos, Hoffman, who has been issuing the instructions. Hoffman beats him to death in an outburst of frustration, to make the man stop talking. After the gassing of this group, a badly shaken Hoffman finds a young girl alive beneath a pile of bodies. He removes her from the chamber and after informing the leader of the insurgency, Schlermer, takes her to a storage room and summons Nyiszli, who revives her. The group decides to hide her in the children's camp. While the prisoners hide her in a dressing room, SS-Oberscharführer Eric Muhsfeldt suddenly walks in. Noticing that one of the prisoners present, Abramowics, is there illegally, he shoots him, prompting the girl to scream and to be discovered. Nyiszli then takes Muhsfeldt outside and tells him about the uprising but cannot tell him where or when it will begin. Muhsfeldt agrees to protect the young girl after the uprising is suppressed.

The insurrection begins and Crematorium IV is destroyed with the smuggled explosives. All of the Sonderkommando prisoners who survive the explosions and gunfights with the SS are captured. They are held until the fire in the crematorium is extinguished, after which they are executed. Hoffmann and a fellow prisoner, Rosenthal, conclude that the girl will not be set free after she is forced to watch the executions. After all captives are shot, the girl is allowed to flee toward the main gate of the camp. Before she can run very far, Muhsfeldt draws his pistol and shoots her. The film closes with a voice-over recitation by the dead girl, and screen text informing the audience that Muhsfeldt was hanged for war crimes after the Auschwitz trial and Nyiszli survived the war but never practiced medicine again.

== Cast ==
- David Arquette as Hoffman
- Steve Buscemi as "Hesch" Abramowics
- David Chandler as Max Rosenthal
- Allan Corduner as Dr. Miklós Nyiszli
- Daniel Benzali as Simon Schlermer
- Mira Sorvino as Dina
- Natasha Lyonne as Rosa
- Michael Stuhlbarg as Cohen
- Harvey Keitel as Erich Muhsfeldt
- Kamelia Grigorova as the Girl
- Velizar Binev as Otto Moll
- Henry Stram as Josef Mengele
- Lee Wilkof as Morris
- Jessica Hecht as Morris's Wife
- Hristo Shopov as Halivni
- Brían F. O'Byrne as SS Untersturmführer
- Valentin Ganev as Torturer

== Production and release ==
The film was based upon Nelson's play, adapted from Nyiszli's book.

An 80 percent scale "model" of the Birkenau camp was built near Sofia, Bulgaria for the production of the film using the original architectural plans.

In the same year that he portrayed Eric Muhsfeldt in The Grey Zone, Keitel played the opposite role of a U.S. Army denazification investigator in the film Taking Sides.

The film was first released on DVD on March 18, 2003. It was released on DVD in the UK, in 2008.

== Reception ==
The film holds a 69% "fresh" rating on Rotten Tomatoes, based on 85 reviews, with the consensus "A grim and devastating tale of the Holocaust." In 2009, Roger Ebert included it in his "Great Movies" series.

== Awards ==
The film received the 2002 National Board of Review Freedom of Expression Award.

== See also ==
- Escape from Sobibor (1987) film about that camp's prisoners' revolt and escape
- Son of Saul (2015), a Hungarian film with a similar plot
- List of Holocaust films
