= Lagerführer =

Paramilitary title for the head of the Schutzstaffel

Lagerführer (Camp Leader) was a paramilitary title of the SS, specific to the Totenkopfverbände (Concentration Camp Service). A Lagerführer was the head SS officer assigned to a particular concentration camp, serving as the commander of the said camp.

The term Lagerführer was distinct and separate from the position of Kommandant. Lagerführers were typically employed in camp complexes, where a main camp would be divided into one or more smaller camps. The most recognizable example of this was the Auschwitz command and control system, in which a single Kommandant oversaw the activities of three subordinate Lagerführers, each in charge of one of three main Auschwitz concentration camps.

The title of Lagerführer was typically not used to denote commanders of "sub-camps". Sub-camps were considered satellite work areas of a single Concentration Camp, often overseen by a senior SS-NCO or a junior SS officer who in turn either answered to their own Lagerführer or the Kommandant of the main camp.

== Sources ==
- Zentner, Christian & Bedürftig, Friedemann, The Encyclopedia of the Third Reich, (Macmillan), New York (1991)
