= Erich Dinges =

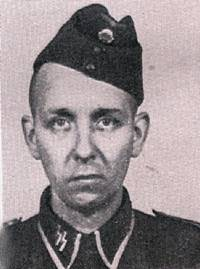
- Erich Dinges
- Born: 20 November 1911; Frankfurt am Main, German Empire
- Died: 23 April 1953 (aged 41)
- Occupation: SS-Sturmmann
- Political party: National Socialist German Workers' Party (NSDAP)
- Motive: Nazism
- Conviction: Crimes against humanity
- Trial: Auschwitz trial
- Penalty: 5 years imprisonment

Erich Adam Oskar Dinges (20 November 1911 – 23 April 1953) was an SS-Sturmmann and member of staff at Auschwitz concentration camp. He was prosecuted at the Auschwitz Trial. Dinges was born in Frankfurt am Main. He worked as a driving instructor. He joined the Nazi Party and the SS on 1 March 1932. From 30 May 1941 to November 1944 he was a chauffeur at Auschwitz.

Dinges was tried by the Supreme National Tribunal in Kraków and was sentenced to 5 years in prison on 22 December 1947. He was released from prison in 1952, after completing his sentence. Dinges died in 1953 under unknown circumstances.
