= Adolf Theuer =

SS Officer

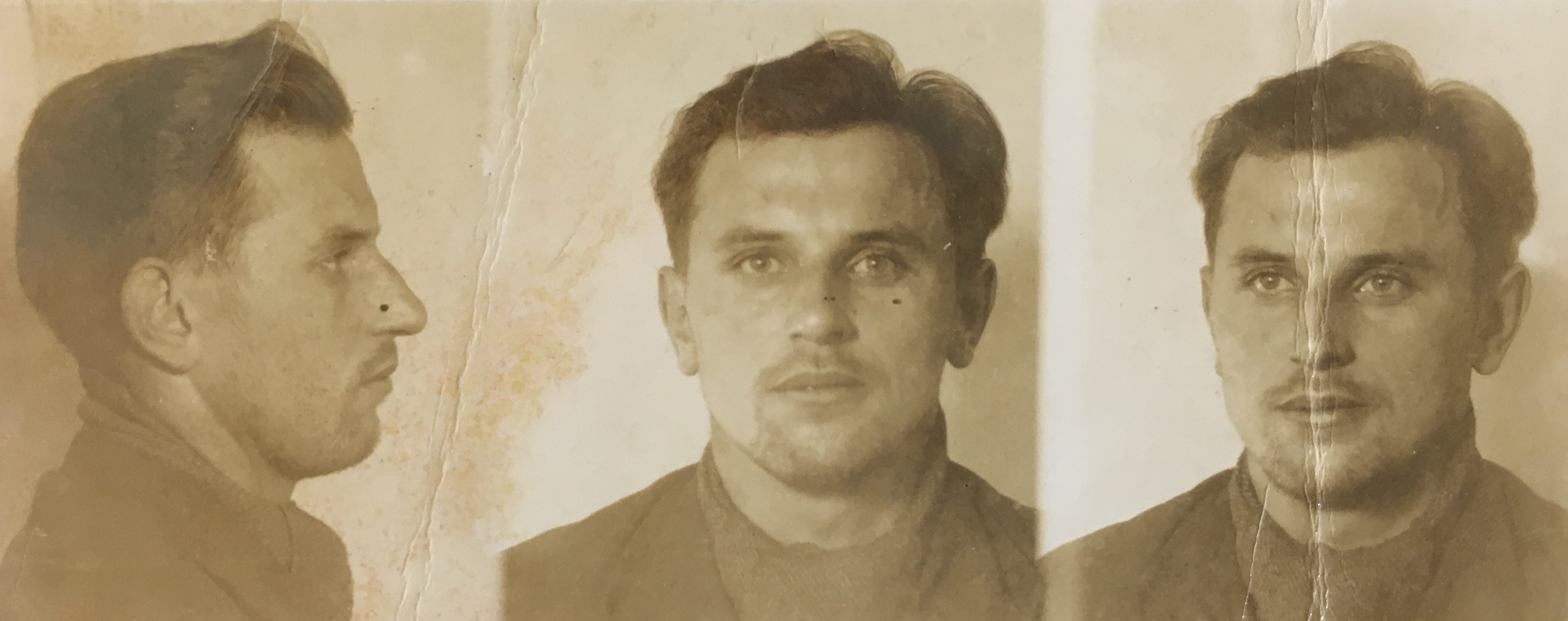
- Adolf Theuer prison photo (1946)
- Born: September 20, 1920; Henneberg-Bolatitz, First Czechoslovak Republic
- Died: April 17, 1947 (aged 26); Opava, Third Czechoslovak Republic
- Occupation: SS-Unterscharführer
- Political party: Nazi Party
- Status: Executed
- Motive: Nazism
- Conviction: Crimes against humanity
- Penalty: Death

Adolf Theuer (sometimes given as Teuer; German: [ˈtɔʏɐ]) was a Sudeten German SS-Unterscharführer and gas chamber mass murderer at Auschwitz concentration camp during the Holocaust. He was executed after the war as a war criminal.

== Life ==
Previously a bricklayer by trade, Theuer's SS career began when he enlisted in the Waffen-SS in 1938 after the Nazi invasion of Czechoslovakia. He was deployed to Auschwitz in 1940 at the rank of SS-Rottenführer. On 1 August 1941 he was promoted to SS-Unterscharführer. He served as an SDG or Sanitätsdienstgefreiter; a medical orderly as part of the Sanitätswesen, one of the five concentration camp departments involved in running such a facility. He was also a member of the Desinfektionskommando (disinfection command), the unit of SS medics involved in the mass gassing of prisoners. One of Theuer's responsibilities was inserting the Zyklon B into the gas chamber, a task shared by other SS orderlies such as SS-Unterscharführer Hans Koch and SS-Oberscharführer Josef Klehr. During the Frankfurt Auschwitz Trials, Klehr, the chief of the Desinfektionskommando, testified that Theuer explained to him that he would insert the gas when ordered to do so by the accompanying SS doctor.

SS-Unterscharführer Oswald Kaduk recalled an incident when Theuer, his fellow Upper Silesian countryman, was reluctant to insert the gas. Kaduk stated that:

"...I have even seen SS men who were supposed to be involved in gassing operations cry. And to them, the then doctor, Dr. Mengele said, 'You have to do it'. He said... I can remember Theuer well. I knew him from... was my fellow countryman, been a young man. And he said, 'You have to do it.' He did it, with tears in his eyes. He inserted it and immediately shut the hatch. I was there."

— Oswald Kaduk, "Auschwitz, Stimmen."

During the Frankfurt Auschwitz trials in the 1960s, Edward Pys, a survivor of Auschwitz, also recounted a gassing done by Theuer:

"When Koch and Theuer began filling the gas tank, the engine of a car parked in front of the crematorium was started and ran at full speed for about a quarter of an hour. Although the crematorium was almost airtight, the noise of the engines could not drown out the screams of the people in the gas room. I heard almost animal screams that no longer had anything human about them. If I hadn't known that there were people in the crematorium, I would never have believed that those screams were made by people. These terrible screams lasted a few minutes."

Theuer remained at the camp until its evacuation in January 1945, when he was subsequently deployed in Ohrdruf concentration camp, a subcamp of Buchenwald concentration camp. He was tasked with murdering sick prisoners.

== Post-war ==
Although Theuer did not torture prisoners, he was still known in the camp as a butcher. After the war he was put on trial along with Sofie Hanel (SS-Hilfsaufseherin, SS-Aufseherin, SS-Blockfuhrer) in Prague; both were sentenced to death. Theuer was hanged in Opava (Czechoslovakia) on 23 April 1947. Hanel was hanged on 12 January 1948.

== Bibliography ==
- Dębski, Jerzy (1995). Death books from Auschwitz: remnants. Volume 1. Auschwitz-Birkenau State Museum ISBN 978-3-598-11262-1
- Frei, Norbert (2000). Darstellungen und Quellen zur Geschichte von Auschwitz. Volume 1. K. G. Saur Verlag. ISBN 978-3-598-24030-0
- Langbein, Hermann (1995). Der Auschwitz-Prozess: eine Dokumentation. Volume 2. Verlag Neue Kritik. ISBN 978-3-8015-0283-6
- Piper, Franciszek; Świebocka, Teresa; Czech, Danuta (1996). Auschwitz: Nazi death camp. Auschwitz-Birkenau State Museum. ISBN 978-83-85047-56-8
