= Josef Kollmer =

SS officer (1901–1948)

- Born: 26 February 1901; Händlern, Bavaria, Germany
- Died: 24 January 1948 (aged 46); Montelupich Prison, Kraków, Polish People's Republic
- Occupation: SS functionary
- Known for: Mass murder at Auschwitz
- Political party: Nazi Party
- Status: Executed by hanging
- Conviction: Crimes against humanity
- Trial: Auschwitz Trial
- Penalty: Death

Josef Kollmer (26 February 1901 – 24 January 1948) was a German SS functionary during the Nazi era who committed mass murder at Auschwitz. He was prosecuted at the Auschwitz Trial.

Born in Händlern, Bavaria, Kollmer was a farmer by trade. He became a member of the SS on 1 January 1935 after having previously spent several years in the German police force. He joined the Nazi party in May 1937. In October 1941 he was drafted into the Waffen-SS and was assigned to Auschwitz, where he commanded various guard companies until October 1943. He then temporarily transferred to Mittelbau-Dora concentration camp, but returned to Auschwitz in May 1944. Initially he commanded the guard company at Auschwitz main camp, then later the one at Monowitz concentration camp from August to October 1944. During his time at Auschwitz, Kollmer participated in the mass murder of Jews in the Birkenau gas chambers, and carried out executions against the shooting wall between blocks 10 and 11 and at the Buna factory.

Kollmer was tried by the Supreme National Tribunal at the Auschwitz Trial in Kraków and was sentenced to death. His sentence was carried out by hanging in Montelupich Prison, Kraków.

== Bibliography ==
- Cyprian T., Sawicki J., Siedem wyroków Najwyższego Trybunału Narodowego, Poznań 1962
