= Franz Romeikat =

- Franz Romeikat
- Born: Ernst Franz Romeikat; 7 October 1904; Iwenberg, East Prussia
- Occupation: SS-Unterscharführer
- Political party: National Socialist German Workers' Party (NSDAP)
- Status: Deceased
- Motive: Nazism
- Trial: Auschwitz trial
- Penalty: 15 years imprisonment

Ernst Franz Romeikat (born 7 October 1904) is an SS-Unterscharführer and staff member at Auschwitz concentration camp. He was prosecuted in the Auschwitz Trial.

Romeikat was born in Iwenberg (then in East Prussia). A watchmaker by trade, he became a member of the Nazi Party and the SS by 6 March 1933. In November 1940, he was drafted into the Waffen-SS and in February 1941 he was assigned to Auschwitz. At first he worked in the clothing section, then from November 1942 to October 1944 he worked in Department IV (Administration), dealing with prisoners' property. He was cruel to prisoners, sometimes beating them, and participated in the plundering of property from those killed in the Birkenau gas chambers.

Romeikat was tried by the Supreme National Tribunal at the Auschwitz Trial in Kraków and sentenced to 15 years in prison for his crimes. Due to an amnesty, he was released in the fifties.

== Bibliography ==
- Cyprian T., Sawicki J., Siedem wyroków Najwyższego Trybunału Narodowego, Poznań 1962
