= Johann Kremer =

German professor, physician and war criminal

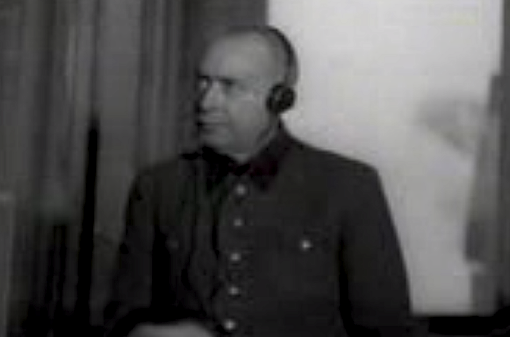
- Kremer at the Auschwitz Trial in Kraków (1947)
- Born: Johann Paul Kremer; December 26, 1883; Stellberg, Germany
- Died: January 8, 1965 (aged 81); Münster, West Germany
- Occupations: Professor of Anatomy; Concentration camp physician
- Known for: Serving as physician in the Auschwitz concentration camp
- Status: Deceased
- Motive: Nazism
- Convictions: Poland; Crimes against humanity West Germany; Accessory to murder (2 counts)
- Trial: Auschwitz trial
- Penalty: Poland; Death; commuted to life imprisonment West Germany; 10 years imprisonment

Johann Paul Kremer (26 December 1883 – 8 January 1965) was a German professor, physician and war criminal.

He was a professor of anatomy and human genetics at Münster University who joined the Wehrmacht on 20 May 1941. He served in the SS in the Auschwitz concentration camp as a physician from 30 August 1942 to 18 November 1942. A member of the NSDAP, he was involved in Nazi human experimentation on the prisoners of Auschwitz-Birkenau. He was sentenced to death in the Auschwitz Trial, but this sentence was later commuted to life imprisonment. He was released in 1958.

== Life prior to Auschwitz ==
Kremer was born in Stellberg. He studied in Heidelberg, Strassburg as well as Berlin; he received his philosophy degree in 1914 and his medical degree in 1919. He also studied natural science and mathematics. He was the assistant surgeon at the surgical clinic of the University, Charité, the ward of internal diseases of the Municipal Hospital Berlin-Neukölln, the surgical clinic of the University of Cologne and prosector in the Institutes of Anatomy in Bonn and Münster. He became Dozent of anatomy in 1929 and was promoted there in 1936 to be professor in commission. At the same time, he was commissioned to lecture on the science of human hereditariness. (Note: Now known as the field of human genetics.) He also did some writing: he mentions two articles that he wrote in the diary he kept, the first being "Inherited or Acquired? A Noteworthy Contribution to the Problem of Hereditariness of Traumatic Deformations" and the second titled "New Elements of Cell and Tissues Investigations".

== Auschwitz ==
=== Medical experiments ===
The main priority of SS doctors at concentration camps throughout Nazi-occupied Europe was not to provide basic medical services to prisoners, but rather to give the appearance of competent medical care. Following the full-scale implementation of the Final Solution, much of their time was occupied with concentration camp exterminations, sorting/selection of the newly-arrived (primarily Jewish) prisoners (e.g. for work, experimentation, or immediate extermination), direct observation of executions and gassings, experimentation, and the fabrication of causes of deaths on prisoner death certificates. The experiments conducted by SS doctors were done for three main reasons: 1) to research methods to improve the health and survivability of soldiers; 2) to lay the groundwork for post-war scientific research; and 3) to carry out the dictates of the racial policies of the Nazi Party. Some experiments were also done at the behest of pharmaceutical companies and medical institutes, for the doctors' own research interests, and to benefit the doctors' personal careers.

Kremer was particularly interested in the effects of starvation on the human body, especially on the liver, and because Kremer was responsible for examining the prisoners that sought admission to the camp infirmary, he was able to personally select the prisoners that he believed would make good test subjects for his experiments. He often performed autopsies in order to extract samples from the liver, spleen and pancreas. On several occasions in his diary, he mentions the extraction of organs and tissues (which he called "living-fresh material") from living victims, such as on October 15, 1942, when he writes, "Living-fresh material of liver, spleen and pancreas taken from an abnormal individual." Kremer's diary contains descriptions of at least five more similar instances. At his hearing on July 30, 1947, Kremer stated that "I observed the prisoners in this group [to be liquidated] carefully and whenever one of them particularly interested me because of his advanced stage of starvation, I ordered the medical orderly to reserve him and to inform me when this patient would be killed by injection."

=== "Special actions" ===
All SS doctors were required to be present at what were called "special actions", which was when the mass gassings took place. The most common victims were children, the elderly, mothers with young children and any others considered unfit to work. During his trial, Kremer described how a gassing was conducted and what his role as doctor was. The gassings were conducted in cabins located on the outskirts of the camp; the victims were transported by railway, and after they arrived, prisoners "were first driven to barracks where the victims undressed and then went naked to the gas chambers. Very often no incidents occurred, as the SS men kept people quiet, maintaining that they were to bathe and be deloused. After driving all of them into the gas chamber the door was closed and an SS man in a gas mask threw the contents of a Cyclon tin through an opening in the side wall. Shouting and screaming of victims could be heard through that openings and it was clear that they fought for their lives. These shouts were heard for a very short period of time. I should say for some minutes but I am unable to give an exact span of time."

=== Executions and beatings ===
Throughout Kremer's diary there are multiple occasions where he mentions being in attendance at various executions and beatings. At least four instances can be found where he mentions executions either by gun, phenol injection, or an unspecified method. He mentions briefly no fewer than three instances where he oversaw the punishment of prisoners. The physicians were required to examine the victim before the punishment and to remain during the administration of punishment; in practice however, physicians rarely, if ever, examined victims and did not openly object to the punishments.

=== Diary ===
Kremer kept a diary of his time at Auschwitz. Interspersed with entries of mundane, day-to-day events are multiple accounts of murder, depravity, gassings and special actions.

September 5, 1942 : In the morning attended a special action from the women's concentration camp; the most dreadful of horrors. Obersturmführer Heinz Thilo was right when he said to me that this is the anus mundi. In the evening towards 8:00 attended another special action from Holland [sic]. Because of the special rations they get a fifth of a liter of schnapps, 5 cigarettes, 100 g salami and bread, the men all clamor to take part in such actions. Today and tomorrow (Sunday) work.

== Trial and conviction ==
After the war, Kremer was arrested by British troops and sent to an internment camp in Neuengamme. He was later extradited to Poland. Kremer was tried in the Auschwitz trials at the sitting of the Supreme Court National Tribune in Kraków throughout November and December 1947. Based on the contents of his diary and his own confessions, Kremer participated in fourteen gassings as well as multiple public executions and special actions, also known as gassings. During his testimony, he described the process by which he selected his victims, the process of gaining the necessary information for his research, and he states that:

After I had been given this information a medical orderly would come and kill the patient with an injection in the heart area. To my knowledge all these patients were killed with phenol injections. The patient died immediately after being given such an injection. I myself never administered fatal injections.

Kremer was sentenced to death. In his clemency petition, Kremer claimed that he was asking for mercy not for his own sake, but for the sake of his research results which he claimed were ready for the public. These results, Kremer claimed, included "the building of gallstones in insects, inflammations, the problem of cancer and, finally, a satisfying answer to the question of inheritance of acquired characteristics." Kremer's petition was successful and his death sentence was commuted to life imprisonment by President Bolesław Bierut. Kremer was released from prison on 11 January 1958. After his return to Germany, Kremer was charged with murder by West German officials. On 29 November 1960, he was found guilty of two counts of being an accessory to murder and was sentenced to 10 years in prison. However, the court credited Kremer for the time he had served in Poland and allowed him to walk free. He was stripped of his civil rights for five years, and was later stripped of all of his medical titles. Kremer went on to testify in the Frankfurt Auschwitz trials. He died in 1965.
