= 23rd SS-Standarte =

- Active: 1943-1945
- Country: Germany
- Branch: Allgemeine-SS
- Garrison/HQ: Auschwitz concentration camp

The 23rd SS-Standarte was a regimental formation of the Allgemeine-SS located in the region of Silesia. Due to its geographical location, the 23rd SS-Standarte is best known for existing as a General-SS counterpart command for Waffen-SS and SS-Totenkopfverbande personnel assigned to Auschwitz concentration camp.

== Operations ==
The Standarte first encompassed administrative control of Auschwitz personnel in 1943, after a territorial command change occurred from the authority of the General Government to that of the Gauleiter of Upper Silesia. Due to the practice of SS members holding in fact two separate SS ranks (one in the General-SS and the other in the Waffen-SS), the 23rd Standarte served as a "paperwork command" for personnel considered "cross assigned" between the General and Waffen-SS. This assignment was purely administrative, and many of the Standarten's "members" never formally mustered as a unit or attended Allgemeine-SS meetings.

The 23rd Standarte effectively ceased to exist due to the advance of the Red Army through Poland in 1944. The command was formally disbanded in May 1945.

== See also ==
- Standarte (Nazi Germany)

== Sources ==
- Yerger, Mark C. Allgemeine-SS: The Commands, Units, and Leaders of the General SS. Atglen, Pennsylvania: Schiffer Publishing (1997). ISBN 0-7643-0145-4
