= Erich Muhsfeldt =

German SS officer (1913–1948)

Erich Mußfeldt
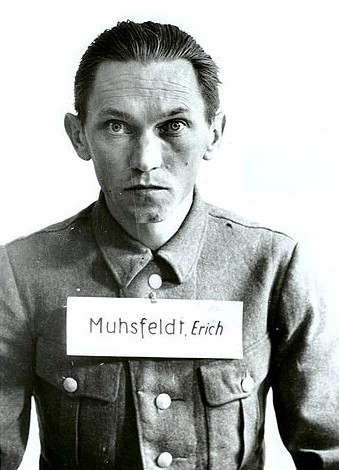
- Erich Mußfeldt at the Auschwitz Trial of 1947 in Kraków
- Born: 18 February 1913; Neubrück, Brandenburg, German Empire
- Died: 24 January 1948 (aged 34); Montelupich Prison, Kraków, Polish People's Republic
- Cause of death: Execution by hanging
- Occupation: Services in extermination camps as SS-Oberscharführer
- Years active: 1940–1945
- Known for: Heading the crematoria of the Majdanek and Auschwitz concentration camps
- Motive: Nazism
- Convictions: U.S. Military; War crimes Poland; Crimes against humanity
- Trial: Auschwitz trial
- Penalty: U.S. Military; Life imprisonment Poland; Death

Erich Mußfeldt also spelled Erich Muhsfeldt (18 February 1913 – 24 January 1948) was a German war criminal.

Muhsfeldt served as an SS NCO in three extermination camps during World War II in German occupied Poland and Germany: Auschwitz, Majdanek and Flossenbürg. After the war, he was tried for war crimes by the U.S. military, found guilty of committing atrocities in Flossenbürg concentration camp, and sentenced to life in prison. However, Muhsfeldt was then extradited to Poland, where the full extent of his war crimes was revealed due to new evidence. He was retried by the Supreme National Tribunal at the Auschwitz Trial in Kraków, and found guilty of crimes against humanity. Muhsfeldt was sentenced to death by hanging in December 1947, and executed on 24 January 1948.

== Pre-war and personal life ==
Erich Muhsfeldt was born on 18 February 1913 in Berkenbrück, Brandenburg, Germany. His father worked as a labourer at the State Water Administration in Fürstenwalde. In 1927, Muhsfeldt completed eight classes of elementary school, and three years later he became a baker, working for two years as a journeyman.

At the time of his service in the SS-Totenkopfverbände, he was reportedly married with two children. The fate of his wife is unclear. According to Miklós Nyiszli, his wife was killed in an air raid, and his son sent to the Eastern front (although it is unlikely any son of his would have been of military age).

== SS career ==
Originally Muhsfeldt served with the German SS-Sonderkommando at Auschwitz I in 1940. He was transferred to the work/extermination camp at Majdanek on 15 November 1941. He was present at the final mass shooting of the camp's remaining Jewish inmates known as the Operation Harvest Festival or Erntefest, the largest single-day, single-camp massacre of the Holocaust, totalling 43,000 in three nearby locations.

Muhsfeldt testified of the incident before the Polish Court in Kraków in 1947:

One day in late October 1943 the excavation of pits was begun behind Compounds V and VI, approximately 50 meters behind the structure of the new Crematorium. 300 inmates were put to this work; they dug without interruption for three days and nights, in two shifts of 150 each. In the course of these three days, three pits were excavated; they were more than two meters deep, zigzag-shaped, and each about 100 m long.

During these three days, special commandos from the concentration camp Auschwitz as well as SS and Police commandos from Cracow, Warsaw, Radom, Lwów and Lublin gathered in Majdanek. Otto Moll and Franz Hössler came from Auschwitz with 10 SS men. Altogether, some 100 SS men arrived from the cities I mentioned, and these SS men made up the Special Commando. On the fourth day-it may have been November 3-reveille was sounded at 5:00 a.m.

Therefore I went to that part of the camp where I usually stayed. The entire camp was surrounded by the police; I would estimate that there were about 500 policemen. They stood guard with their weapons at the ready. They were armed with heavy and light submachine guns as well as with other automatic weapons. A truck mounted with a radio transmitter was parked near the new Crematorium; a second such truck stood near the camp entrance, not far from the Building Administration. When I arrived at the camp grounds, both transmitters were already on. They broadcast German marches and songs as well as dance music from records. The two trucks had been provided by the Propaganda Office [of the NSDAP] in Lublin.

I want to stress that up to that day I had no idea of the storm that was gathering. While the pits were being dug I had thought that they were air-raid trenches, since an anti-aircraft battery was stationed nearby. I asked an SS-man what they were for but I received no answer, and I got the impression that he himself didn't know what it was all about. The Jews who had been put to digging the pits replied to my questions that these pits were surely intended for them. I wouldn't believe that; I laughed at them and said that no doubt they were air-raid trenches. It was an honest remark, for at that time I really thought that.

Around 6:00 a.m.-or maybe it was already near 7:00 a.m.-the operation began. Some of the Jews who were gathered on Compound V were herded into a barrack, where they had to strip naked. Then Commander Anton Thumann cut the wires of the fence separating Compound V from those pits, making a passageway. Armed policemen formed a human chain from this passageway to the pit. The naked Jews were led past this line-up to the pits, where an SS-man from the Special Commando chased them into one of the pits, in groups of ten. When they were in one, they were chased to the other end of the pit, where they had to lie down, and then an SS-man from the Special Commando shot them from the edge of the pit. The next group was likewise driven to the same end of the pit, where they had to lie down on the bodies already there, so that the pit gradually filled with layers of corpses lying crosswise almost up to the edge. Men and women were shot separately, in separate groups.

This operation went on without a pause until 5:00 p.m. The SS-men in charge of overseeing the execution took turns; after their replacements arrived they went to the local SS barrack to eat, and the execution continued without respite. Music was blaring from the two radio transmitters the entire time. I observed these events from the new Crematorium, where I had my own room for myself and the inmates assigned to my unit.

According to testimony at the Majdanek trials at one "selection" at KZ Majdanek a female KZ inmate scratched Muhsfeldt's face asking why she had to die; Muhsfeldt ordered her to be bound and thrown alive into a Crematorium. When the Majdanek camp was liquidated, Muhsfeldt was transferred back to Auschwitz, where he then served as supervising SS officer of the Jewish Sonderkommando in Crematorium II and III in Auschwitz II (Birkenau).

Upon his return to Auschwitz, Muhsfeldt had an unusual relationship with renowned Jewish-Hungarian pathologist Miklós Nyiszli, who was forced to carry out autopsies on behalf of Josef Mengele. According to Nyiszli, "[Muhsfeldt] often came to see me in the dissecting room, and we conversed on politics, the military situation and various other subjects." Nyiszli survived the war and later gave evidence about what happened at Auschwitz. Nyiszli described one incident when Muhsfeldt came to him for a routine check-up, after shooting 80 prisoners in the back of the head prior to their cremation:

Later Mussfeld(sic) paid me a visit and asked me to give him a physical check up. He suffered from heart trouble and severe headaches. I checked his blood pressure, took his pulse, listened to his heart with a stethoscope. His pulse rate was slightly high. I gave him my opinion: his condition was no doubt the result of the little job he had just performed in the furnace room. I had wanted to reassure him, but the result was just the opposite. He became indignant, got up and said: "Your diagnosis is incorrect. It doesn't bother me any more to kill 100 men than it does to kill 5. If I'm upset, it's merely because I drink too much." And so saying he turned and walked away, greatly displeased.

Nyiszli described an exceedingly rare occurrence, in which an inmate girl of 16, due to highly unusual circumstances, managed to survive the gas chamber and, with medical help from Nyiszli and others after she was discovered alive, was partially recovering. Nyiszli took up her case with Muhsfeldt asking that her life be spared: "These were my arguments, and I asked him to do something for the child. He listened to me attentively, then asked me exactly what I proposed doing. I saw by his expression that I had put him face to face with a practically impossible problem."

Muhsfeldt replied, "There's no way of getting round it, the child will have to die." Nyiszli explains that "Half an hour later the young girl was led, or rather carried, into the furnace room hallway, and there [Muhsfeldt] sent another in his place to do the job. A bullet in the back of the neck..."

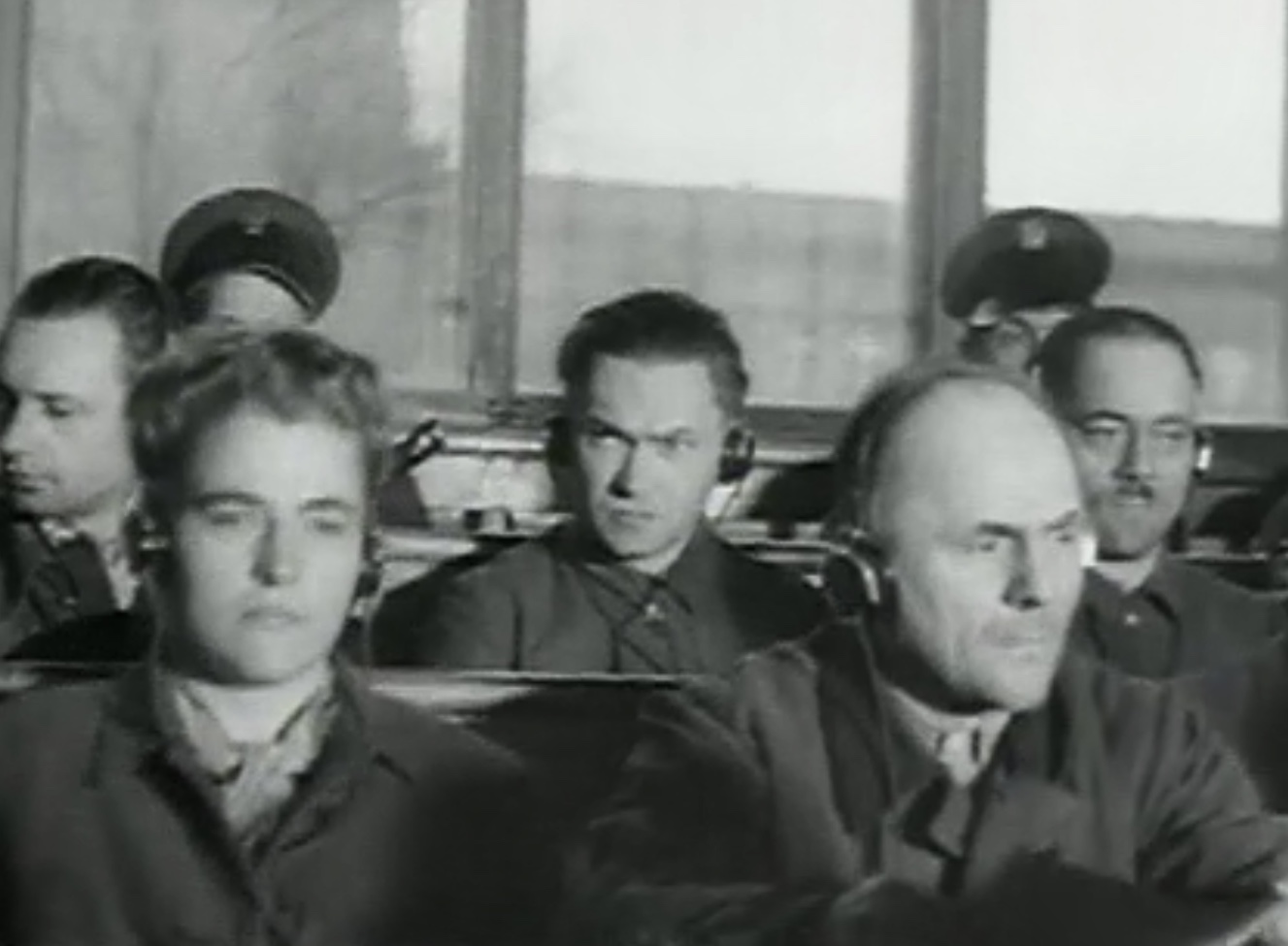
Erich Muhsfeldt (center) at the Auschwitz Kraków trial, 1947

== Trial ==
After the war had ended, Muhsfeldt was arrested by U.S. military officials. He was tried for committing atrocities in Flossenbürg concentration camp by an American military court. Witnesses said they saw Muhsfeldt beat and shoot multiple prisoners. In January 1947, Muhsfeldt was found guilty and given a life sentence. However, he was then extradited to Poland where he was retried in Kraków by the Supreme National Tribunal in November 1947 for crimes committed in Auschwitz. In December 1947, Muhsfeldt was found guilty of crimes against humanity and sentenced to death. He was executed in 1948.

== In popular culture ==
Muhsfeldt appears as a minor character in the 1983 James Michener novel Poland, and is portrayed by Harvey Keitel in the 2001 film The Grey Zone.
