= Hans Wilhelm König =

SS officer, Nazi physician at Auschwitz

- Born: May 13, 1912; Stuttgart, Kingdom of Württemberg
- Died: c. 1991 (presumed)
- Known for: Crimes against humanity at Auschwitz

Hans Wilhelm König (13 May 1912 – c. 1991) was a German Schutzstaffel Obersturmführer and a Lagerarzt (camp doctor) at the Auschwitz and Neuengamme concentration camps.

== Life and career ==
After completing primary schooling, König began studying medicine. He completed a nine-month internship as a medical assistant in 1938 at the University of Göttingen Medical Center. On July 16, 1938, he married the Swedish woman Dagmar Kalling in Oslo. König became an assistant doctor in Höxter in November of the next year, and moved into Godelheim in 1941. König completed his doctorate on 30 March 1943 by submitting his dissertation to the University of Göttingen.

König joined the Nazi Party on 1 September 1939, then joined the Waffen-SS in June 1943. Around this time, he became a camp doctor at Auschwitz I or Birkenau. There he participated in selections for the gas chambers in the women's camps, tested drugs on prisoners on behalf of IG Farben and Bayer, and tested electroshock weapons on female prisoners. In Autumn of 1944, König succeeded Horst Fischer as supervisor of Auschwitz III. König passed through the Mittelbau camp when Auschwitz was evacuated and resumed his work at Neuengamme.

Under the pseudonym Ernest Peltz, König escaped to Colnrade, where he received a permit to practice medicine as a doctor from the British authority. When rumors about Peltz's authenticity began circulating and an investigation was opened, he closed his practice in 1962 and fled the country. While his whereabouts are unknown, it is believed that König died sometime in 1991.

== Conduct at Auschwitz ==
Hermann Langbein records in People of Auschwitz that König used his time at Auschwitz to advance his medical studies. König studied with Jewish doctors, whom he treated cordially, but also performed dangerous and invasive procedures on the basis of his own interest. One of those physicians, Ella Lingens-Reiner, described that prisoners whose sickness interested König received better care until he grew bored with their condition, at which point König assigned them to the gas chamber.

== Legacy ==
König is mentioned by name in Binjamin Wilkomirski's fraudulent autobiography Fragments, but König was not present at Auschwitz at the same time Wilkomirski alleged he was.
