= Hans Hoffmann =

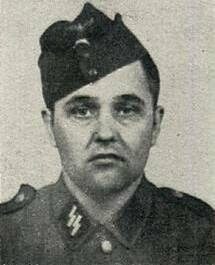
- Hans Hoffmann (here: SS-Mann)
- Born: 2 December 1919; Indija
- Occupation: SS-Rottenführer
- Political party: National Socialist German Workers' Party (NSDAP)
- Status: Deceased
- Motive: Nazism
- Conviction: Crimes against humanity
- Trial: Auschwitz Trial
- Penalty: 15 years imprisonment

Hans Hoffmann (born 2 December 1919) was an SS-Rottenführer and member of staff at Auschwitz concentration camp. He was prosecuted at the Auschwitz Trial.

== Biography ==
Born in Indija, Hoffmann was a German national with Yugoslavian citizenship. He worked as a locksmith. Following the invasion by Nazi forces, Hoffmann was drafted into the Yugloslavian army, and was taken prisoner by Germany. He joined the SS on October 21, 1942, and was deployed to Auschwitz, where he initially worked as a guard. Later he was assigned to the Politische Abteilung (camp Gestapo) in the main camp. In October 1944, he was deployed to Birkenau, where he worked as an interrogator.

Hoffmann was tried by the Supreme National Tribunal at the Auschwitz Trial in Kraków for his role at the camp, and was sentenced to 15 years in prison. Due to an amnesty, he was released from prison on 14 July 1956.
