= Pohoří na Šumavě =

- Hamlet
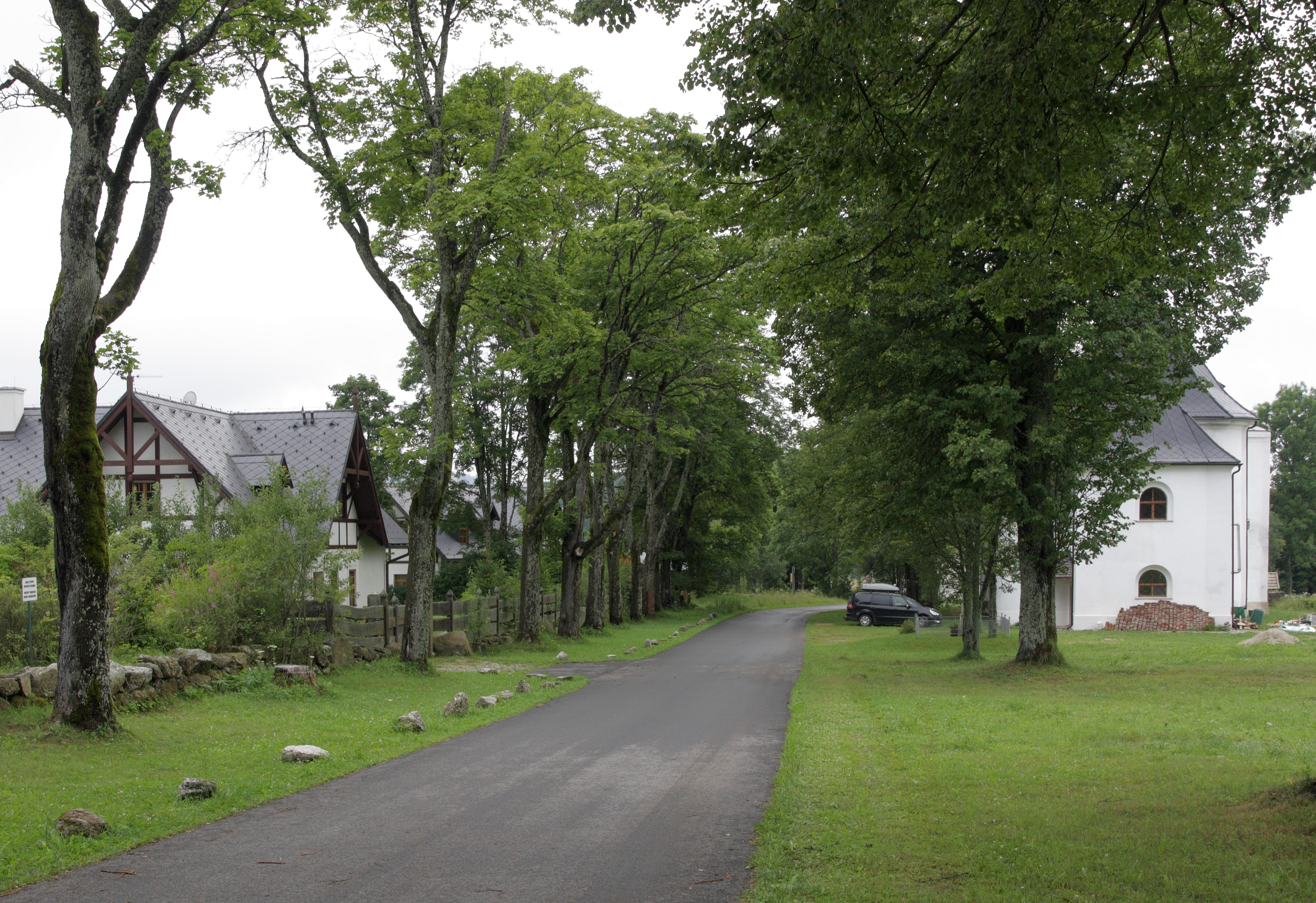
- Main street

- Location in the Czech Republic
- Coordinates: 48°36′13″N 14°41′47″E
- Country: Czech Republic
- Region: South Bohemian
- District: Český Krumlov
- Municipality: Pohorská Ves
- First mentioned: 1524

Area
  - Total: 26.35 km^{2} (10.17 sq mi)
- Elevation: 920 m (3,020 ft)

Population (2021)
  - Total: 0
  - Density: 0.0/km^{2} (0.0/sq mi)
- Time zone: UTC+1 (CET)
  - Summer (DST): UTC+2 (CEST)
- Postal code: 382 41

Pohoří na Šumavě (German: Buchers, Puchers) is a hamlet and administrative part of Pohorská Ves in Český Krumlov District in the South Bohemian Region of the Czech Republic. As of census 2021, it has no permanent inhabitants. It used to be a separate municipality and a regular village, which was abandoned in the 1970s.

The village was named Buchoř until 1910 and Půchoří until 1923, when it was renamed Pohoří na Šumavě.

== Demographics ==
Historical population

| Year | Pop. | ±% |
|---|---|---|
| 1869 | 1,488 | — |
| 1880 | 1,414 | −5.0% |
| 1890 | 1,323 | −6.4% |
| 1900 | 1,274 | −3.7% |
| 1910 | 1,166 | −8.5% |

| Year | Pop. | ±% |
|---|---|---|
| 1921 | 1,055 | −9.5% |
| 1930 | 937 | −11.2% |
| 1950 | 97 | −89.6% |
| 1961 | 31 | −68.0% |
| 1970 | 35 | +12.9% |

| Year | Pop. | ±% |
|---|---|---|
| 1980 | 0 | −100.0% |
| 1991 | 0 | 0.00% |
| 2001 | 0 | 0.00% |
| 2011 | 0 | 0.00% |
| 2021 | 0 | 0.00% |

Source: Censuses

== Nature protection ==
There are several nature monuments in the area of Pohoří na Šumavě: Myslivna, Pohořské rašeliniště, Prameniště Pohořského potoka, Stodůlecký vrch and U tří můstků.
