= Auschwitz trial =

1947 Polish trial of nazi German death camp staff

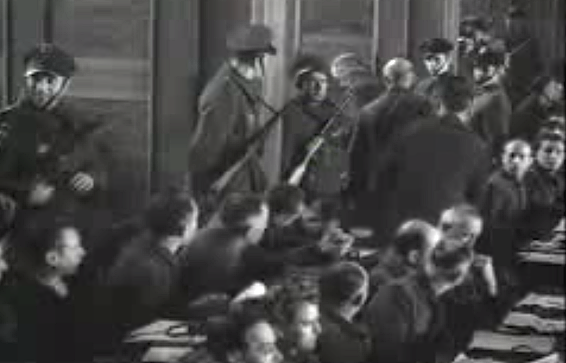
Auschwitz trial proceedings, Kraków, Poland

The Auschwitz trial began on November 24, 1947, in Kraków, when Poland's Supreme National Tribunal tried forty former staff of the Auschwitz concentration camps. The trials ended on December 22, 1947.

The best-known defendants were Arthur Liebehenschel, former commandant; Maria Mandl, head of the Auschwitz women's camps; and SS-doctor Johann Kremer. Thirty-seven other SS officers—thirty-three men and four women—who had served as guards or doctors in the camps were also tried.

== Verdict of the Supreme National Tribunal in the first Auschwitz trial ==
Torturing of prisoners [of Auschwitz] already tormented to the extreme [by extrajudicial means], is the evidence of inhuman savagery perpetrated by those defendants who as a result of the trial were sentenced to death. The listed violent crimes committed by named defendants, who all took smaller or larger part in the mass murder of prisoners, also reveal that the accused were involved in the acts of killing for pleasure, and not pursuant to orders of their superiors. If it were not for their expressed desire to kill, they would have otherwise displayed elements of sympathy for the victims, or at least show indifference to their plight, but not torture them to death.

— Excerpt from the verdict

#	Defendant	Rank	Function	Sentence
1	Arthur Liebehenschel	SS-Obersturmbannführer	Camp commandant	Death by hanging (executed on 24 January 1948)
2	Hans Aumeier	SS-Sturmbannführer	Schutzhaftlagerführer	Death by hanging (executed on 24 January 1948)
3	Maximilian Grabner	SS-Untersturmführer	Camp Gestapo chief	Death by hanging (executed on 24 January 1948)
4	Karl Möckel	SS-Obersturmbannführer	Manager of camp administration	Death by hanging (executed on 24 January 1948)
5	Maria Mandl	SS-Oberaufseherin	Birkenau female camp commandant	Death by hanging (executed on 24 January 1948)
6	Franz Xaver Kraus	SS-Sturmbannführer	Information officer	Death by hanging (executed on 24 January 1948)
7	Ludwig Plagge	SS-Oberscharführer	Rapportführer	Death by hanging (executed on 24 January 1948)
8	Fritz Buntrock	SS-Unterscharführer	Rapportführer	Death by hanging (executed on 24 January 1948)
9	Wilhelm Gerhard Gehring	SS-Hauptscharführer	Subcamp commandant	Death by hanging (executed on 24 January 1948)
10	Otto Lätsch	SS-Unterscharführer	Subcamp vice commandant	Death by hanging (executed on 24 January 1948)
11	Heinrich Josten	SS-Obersturmführer	Commander of the camp guard	Death by hanging (executed on 24 January 1948)
12	Josef Kollmer	SS-Obersturmführer	Commander of the camp guard	Death by hanging (executed on 24 January 1948)
13	Erich Muhsfeldt	SS-Oberscharführer	Birkenau crematoria manager	Death by hanging (executed on 24 January 1948)
14	Hermann Kirschner	SS-Unterscharführer	Camp administration	Death by hanging (executed on 24 January 1948)
15	Hans Schumacher	SS-Unterscharführer	Manager of camp food supplies	Death by hanging (executed on 24 January 1948)
16	August Bogusch	SS-Scharführer	Camp administration	Death by hanging (executed on 24 January 1948)
17	Therese Brandl	SS-Aufseherin	SS-Erstaufseherin	Death by hanging (executed on 24 January 1948)
18	Paul Szczurek	SS-Unterscharführer	Blockführer	Death by hanging (executed on 24 January 1948)
19	Paul Götze	SS-Rottenführer	Blockführer	Death by hanging (executed on 24 January 1948)
20	Herbert Paul Ludwig	SS-Oberscharführer	Blockführer	Death by hanging (executed on 24 January 1948)
21	Kurt Hugo Müller	SS-Unterscharführer	Blockführer	Death by hanging (executed on 24 January 1948)
22	Johann Kremer	SS-Obersturmführer	Camp doctor	Death by hanging (commuted to life imprisonment)
23	Arthur Breitwieser	SS-Unterscharführer	Camp administration	Death by hanging (commuted to life imprisonment)
24	Detlef Nebbe	SS-Sturmscharführer	Sergeant of the guard company	Life imprisonment
25	Karl Seufert	SS-Hauptscharführer	Manager of prisoner block	Life imprisonment
26	Hans Koch	SS-Unterscharführer	Camp disinfection	Life imprisonment
27	Luise Danz	SS-Aufseherin	Female guard	Life imprisonment
28	Adolf Medefind	SS-Unterscharführer	Guard	Life imprisonment
29	Anton Lechner	SS-Rottenführer	Guard	Life imprisonment
30	Franz Romeikat	SS-Unterscharführer	Camp administration	15 years imprisonment
31	Hans Hoffmann	SS-Rottenführer	Camp Gestapo unit	15 years imprisonment
32	Hildegard Lächert	SS-Aufseherin	Female guard	15 years imprisonment
33	Alice Orlowski	SS-Aufseherin	Female guard	15 years imprisonment
34	Johannes Weber	SS-Sturmmann	Camp kitchen	15 years imprisonment
35	Alexander Bülow	SS-Sturmmann	Guard	15 years imprisonment
36	Eduard Lorenz	SS-Unterscharführer	Guard	15 years imprisonment
37	Richard Schröder	SS-Unterscharführer	Camp accounting	10 years imprisonment
38	Erich Dinges	SS-Sturmmann	Guard	5 years imprisonment
39	Karl Jeschke	SS-Oberscharführer	Guard	3 years imprisonment
40	Hans Münch	SS-Untersturmführer	Doctor in SS Hygiene Institute	Acquitted

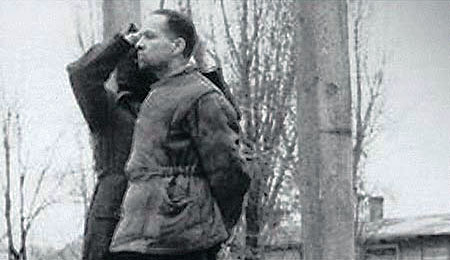
Rudolf Höss immediately before being hanged

Rudolf Höss, sentenced in a previous trial, was executed on April 16, 1947, in front of the crematorium at Auschwitz I. The trial of camp commandant Höss, which took place at the Supreme National Tribunal in Warsaw throughout March 1947, was the first trial held at Auschwitz, followed by the trials in Kraków several months later.

== Summary ==
The Supreme National Tribunal presiding in Kraków issued 23 death sentences, and 17 imprisonments ranging from life sentences to 3 years. All executions were carried out on January 24, 1948, at the Kraków Montelupich Prison, "one of the most terrible Nazi prisons in occupied Poland" used by Gestapo throughout World War II. Maria Mandl and Therese Brandl were the first to be executed. One person was acquitted: Sergeant Major Hans Münch, who refused to participate in the selection process and made futile, although confirmed, requests for more food to the inmates. Liebehenschel, Mandel and Kremer were condemned to death, as were Hans Aumeier, August Bogusch, Therese Brandl, Arthur Breitwieser, Fritz Buntrock, Wilhelm Gehring, Paul Götze, Maximilian Grabner, Heinrich Josten, Hermann Kirschner, Josef Kollmer, Franz Kraus, Herbert Ludwig, Karl Möckel, Kurt Mueller, Eric Muhsfeldt, Ludwig Plagge, Hans Schumacher and Paul Szczurek (Arthur Breitwieser and Johann Kremer had their sentences commuted to life imprisonment). Luise Danz, Hans Koch, Anton Lechner, Adolf Medefind, Detlef Nebbe, and Karl Seufert received life sentences. Alexander Bülow, Hans Hoffmann, Hildegard Lächert, Eduard Lorenz, Alice Orlowski, Franz Romeikat, and Johannes Weber were sentenced to 15 years. Richard Schroeder received 10 years, Erich Dinges five years, and Karl Jeschke three years. Hans Münch was acquitted.

== See also ==
- Belzec trial before the 1st Munich District Court in the mid-1960s, eight SS-men of the Belzec extermination camp tried, seven acquitted
- Chełmno trials of the Chełmno extermination camp personnel, held in Poland and in Germany. The cases were decided almost twenty years apart
- Dachau trials held within the walls of the former Dachau concentration camp, 1945–1948
- Majdanek trials, the longest Nazi war crimes trial in history, spanning over 30 years
- Nuremberg trials of the 24 most important leaders of the Third Reich, 1945–1946
- Sobibor trial held in Hagen, Germany in 1965, concerning the Sobibor extermination camp

== Notes and references ==
- Cyprian T., Sawicki J., Siedem wyroków Najwyższego Trybunału Narodowego, Poznań, 1962
- G. Álvarez, Mónica. "Guardianas Nazis. El lado femenino del mal". Madrid: Grupo Edaf, 2012. ISBN 978-84-414-3240-6
