= Luise Danz =

German Nazi concentration camp guard (1917–2009)

- Danz's booking photo in 1945
- Born: 11 December 1917; Walldorf, Thuringia, German Empire
- Died: 21 June 2009 (aged 91); Walldorf, Thuringia, Germany
- Citizenship: German
- Occupation: Concentration camp guard
- Status: Deceased after release
- Motive: Nazism
- Conviction: Crimes against humanity
- Trial: Auschwitz trial
- Penalty: Life imprisonment (served 10 years)

Luise Danz (11 December 1917 – 21 June 2009) was a Nazi concentration camp guard. Danz was captured in 1945 and put on trial for crimes against humanity at the Auschwitz trial in Kraków, Poland. She was sentenced to life imprisonment in 1947, but released due to general amnesty on 20 August 1957.

== Early life ==
Luise Danz was born in Walldorf (Werra) in Thuringia on 11 December 1917. On 24 January 1943, at the age of 25, Danz was conscripted as an SS-Aufseherin within the Nazi concentration camp system at Ravensbrück.

== Atrocities ==
Danz served as guard in several camps in occupied Poland, including Majdanek (1943-April 1944), Kraków-Płaszów (April 1944), Auschwitz-Birkenau (May 1944-January 1945) and Malchow (subcamp of Ravensbrück). In 1943, she received an award from Nazi Germany for her camp service. From 1 March 1943, she completed a three-week guard course at the Ravensbrück concentration camp and on 22 March 1943, transferred to Majdanek. There she oversaw the women's camp work details performing tailoring, kitchen, nursery and clothing store. During the evacuation of Majdanek at the end of April 1944, Danz was in the Plaszow concentration camp. Halina Nelken remembered her in Plaszow: "Danz, tall, slender, and with a gaunt, boyish face was a specialist in punching jaws with her fist and at the same time bringing her knee up into a stomach. The woman she was mistreating fainted immediately."

After the evacuation of Plaszow concentration camp, Danz was in Auschwitz-Birkenau in September or October 1944, where she oversaw a Jewish commando in the concentration camp laundry and led the leather detail as a Kommandofuhrerin. She rose to the rank of Rapportfuhrerin in the camp for Hungarian Jewish women. After the evacuation of Auschwitz took place in January 1945, she was moved to Ravensbrück and on to its subcamp in Malchow.

She became Oberaufseherin in Malchow in January 1945 upon her arrival and served in that capacity until the beginning of May 1945. In Malchow 900 female prisoners worked in Verwertchemie, the local explosives factory for recovery of chemicals work. Danz's behavior is said to have evolved according to statements of surviving prisoners of the different camps into that of a sadist. She abused prisoners, for example, with her bull whip. She also aided in the hanging of Russian women prisoners and conducted hours-long prisoner roll calls that claimed many lives from exposure and exhaustion.

== Capture and trials ==
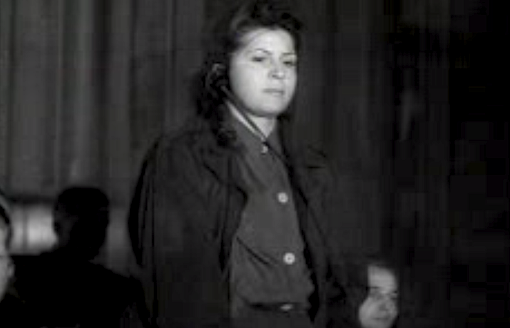
Danz at her trial in 1947

At the end of the war in May 1945, Danz tried to slip away, but was discovered, captured and arrested on 1 June 1945 in Lützow and tried by Poland at the Auschwitz Trial. At her 1947 trial, she was sentenced to life imprisonment, but was released early in 1957 after serving 10 years.

In 1996, she was tried before a German court for the alleged murder of a teenager in Malchow. German doctors said the defendant was too old to withstand court proceedings, so the charge was dropped. She died on 21 June 2009, at the age of 91.

== See also ==
- Female guards in Nazi concentration camps

== Sources ==
- Dublon-Knebel, Irith (2005). "'Erinnern kann ich mich nur an eine Frau Danz...': Die Aufseherin Luise Danz in der Erinnerung ihrer Opfer". In Bock, Gisela (ed.). Genozid und Geschlecht. Jüdische Frauen im nationalsozialistischen Lagersystem. Frankfurt am Main: Campus. pp. 66–84. ISBN 3-593-37730-6.
