= Alice Orlowski =

German war criminal and Nazi concentration camp guard

- SS Aufseherin Alice Orlowski
- Born: Alice Minna Elisabeth Elling; 30 September 1903; Berlin, German Empire
- Died: 21 May 1976 (aged 72); Düsseldorf, West Germany
- Status: Deceased after release
- Motive: Nazism
- Convictions: Poland; Crimes against humanity West Germany incitement of popular hatred
- Trial: Auschwitz trial
- Penalty: Poland; 15 years imprisonment (served 10); West Germany; 10 months imprisonment (served 8)

Alice Orlowski (30 September 1903 – 21 May 1976) was a German concentration camp guard at several of the Nazi concentration camps in German-occupied Poland (1939–1945) during World War II. After the war, a Polish court convicted of her crimes against humanity, and she served 10 years in prison in Poland. In 1973, Orlowski, then 70 and living as a pensioner in West Germany, muttered that only "half the work" had been finished, referring to the extermination of the Jews in the Holocaust. She was arrested, convicted of incitement of popular hatred, and sentenced to 10 months in prison.

== Wartime ==
Born as Alice Minna Elisabeth Elling in Berlin in 1903. She began to train as a guard at the Ravensbrück concentration camp in Germany in 1941. In October 1942, she was selected as one of the Schutzstaffel (SS) Aufseherin to be posted at the Majdanek camp near Lublin, in German-occupied Poland. At Majdanek, along with Hermine Braunsteiner, she came to be regarded as the most brutal overseer. They regularly loaded trucks of women destined for the gas chambers. When a child was left over, the two would throw him or her on the top of the adults like luggage and bolt the door shut in what they called "a space-saving operation". Orlowski often awaited the arrivals of new transports of women. She would then whip the prisoners, especially across the eyes. In Majdanek, Orlowski was promoted to the rank of Kommandoführerin (Work Detail Overseer) in the sorting sheds.

As the SS Aufseherin, Orlowski supervised over 100 women, who sorted through items taken from prisoners who had been gassed: watches, furs, coats, gold, jewellery, money, toys, glasses, and so on. When the camp was evacuated, the Germans sent Orlowski to the notorious Kraków-Płaszów concentration camp near Kraków, in German-occupied Poland. In Plaszow-Kraków, Orlowski was in charge of a work detail on the Camp Street (Lager Strasse) and was known for her viciousness.

In early January 1945, Orlowski was among the SS women posted on the death march to Auschwitz-Birkenau and it was during this time that her behaviour, previously observed as being brutal and sadistic, became more humane. On the death march in mid-January 1945 from Auschwitz to Loslau, Orlowski gave comfort to the inmates, and even slept alongside them on the ground outside. She also brought water to those who were thirsty. It is unknown why her attitude changed, but some speculate that she sensed the war was almost over and she would soon be tried as a war criminal. Orlowski ended up back at Ravensbrück as a guard.

== Post-war ==
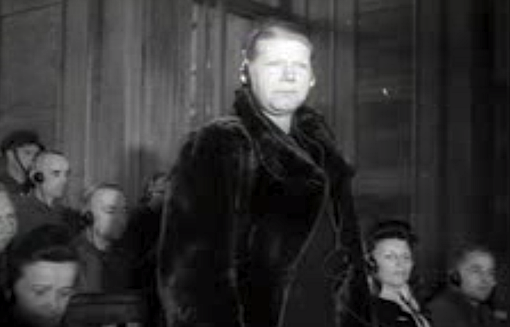
Orlowski at the Auschwitz Trial in 1947

After the war ended in May 1945, Orlowski was captured by Soviet forces and extradited to Poland to stand trial for war crimes. The "picture book SS woman" stood accused at the Auschwitz Trial in 1947. She was sentenced to 15 years in prison, but was released in 1957 after serving 10 years. After her release, Orlowski moved to West Germany.

In 1973, Orlowski was at a counter in Cologne when she complained that only "half the work" had been finished, referring to the extermination of the Jews and also allegedly said that "it took twice as long to serve a beer as it did to kill all the Jews." In response, she was arrested and the court found her guilty of incitement of popular hatred and sentenced her to ten months in prison, of which she served eight months.

In 1975, the West German authorities arrested Orlowski a second time at the Düsseldorf Regional Court, for crimes committed in Majdanek. She was put on trial in the Third Majdanek Trial. Orlowski died from natural causes during her trial on 21 May 1976.

== See also ==
- Female guards in Nazi concentration camps
- Auschwitz trial
