= Arthur Liebehenschel =

SS officer in Nazi Germany (1901–1948)

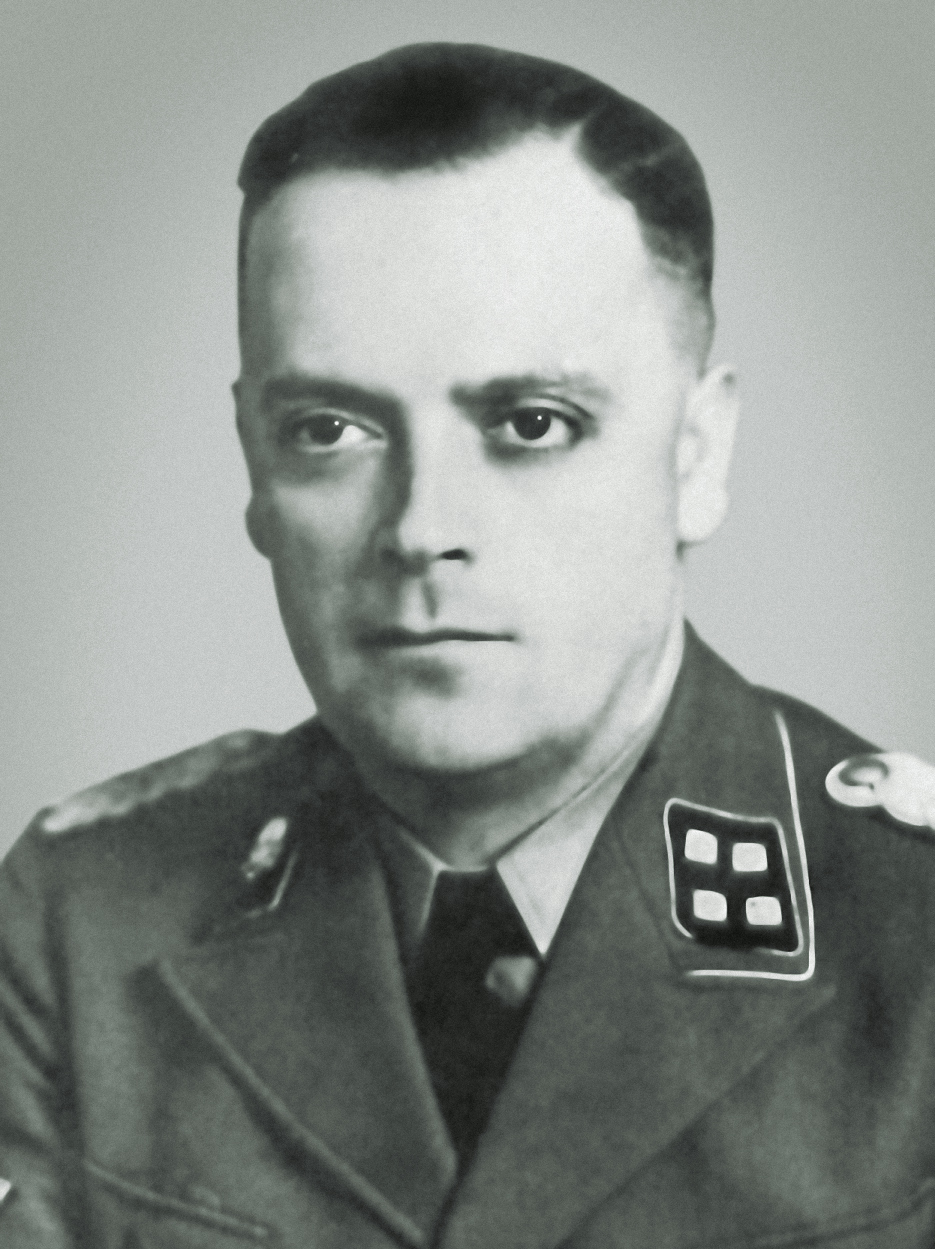
- Official portrait, c. 1940
- Born: 25 November 1901; Posen, German Empire
- Died: 24 January 1948 (aged 46); Montelupich Prison, Kraków, Polish People's Republic
- Children: 5
- Status: Executed by hanging
- Motive: Nazism
- Conviction: Crimes against humanity
- Trial: Auschwitz trial
- Penalty: Death
- SS career
- Allegiance: Nazi Germany
- Branch: SS-Totenkopfverbände
- Service years: 1934–1945
- Rank: SS-Obersturmbannführer
- Commands: Auschwitz, 1 December 1943 – 8 May 1944; Majdanek, 19 May – 22 July 1944

Arthur Liebehenschel (German: [ˈaʁtuːɐ̯ ˈliːbəhɛnʃl̩]; 25 November 1901 – 24 January 1948) was a German commandant at the Auschwitz and Majdanek concentration camps during the Holocaust. Following the war, he was convicted of war crimes by the Polish government and executed in 1948.

== Early life ==
Liebehenschel was born on 25 November 1901 in Posen (now Poznań). He studied economics and public administration. Too young to serve in World War I, Liebehenschel enrolled in the Freikorps "Grenzschutz Ost" in 1919. He also served as a sergeant major in the German armed forces (Reichswehr) afterwards.

== SS career ==
In 1932, Liebehenschel joined the Nazi Party and in 1934 the SS, where he served in the SS-Totenkopfverbände (SS-TV). Liebehenschel became the adjutant in the Lichtenburg concentration camp, and two years later was transferred to the Concentration Camps Inspectorate in Berlin. In 1942, when the SS Main Economic and Administrative Office was founded, Liebehenschel was assigned to the Department D (Concentration Camps) as head of DI (Central Office).

On 1 December 1943, Liebehenschel was appointed commandant of Auschwitz I concentration camp, succeeding Rudolf Höss. While continuing mass executions, he made some minor "improvements" including removing the standing cells and halting the selections to gas chambers among regular prisoners. According to Hermann Langbein, a prisoner at Auschwitz infirmary: "in general one could establish that even those SS members who were very bloodthirsty before became a bit more reserved because they realized that their fanaticism would not necessarily be tolerated anymore."

On 8 May 1944, Höss returned to Auschwitz, replacing Liebehenschel, who was appointed commandant of the already emptied Majdanek camp on 19 May, succeeding Martin Gottfried Weiss. The camp was evacuated because of the Soviet advance into German-occupied Poland. Liebehenschel relocated to Trieste, Italy to the office of Odilo Globocnik, the SS and Police Leader for Operational Zone Adriatic Coast (OZAK). Liebehenschel became head of the SS Manpower Office there.

== Criminal conviction ==
At the war's end, Liebehenschel was arrested by the U.S. Army and extradited to Poland. After being convicted of crimes against humanity at the Auschwitz Trial in Kraków, he was sentenced to death and subsequently executed by hanging on 24 January 1948.

== Family ==
Liebehenschel had one son and three daughters by his first wife, Gertrud, the youngest of whom, Barbara Ursula Cherish (born 1943 in Oranienburg), now lives in the United States.

In 2009, Cherish published her book My Father, the Auschwitz Commandant, in which she outlined actions by Liebehenschel that improved the prisoners' lives, but also discussed his participation in a genocidal system. Together with another daughter, Antje, Cherish was interviewed in 2002 by ZDF, the German television channel, about living with their father's guilt. Liebehenschel had a son by his second wife, Anneliese. Liebehenschel's first wife, whom he left during the war, suffered from mental health issues after the war and committed suicide in a hospital for the mentally ill in 1966.

Military offices
Preceded by SS-Obersturmbannführer Rudolf Höss	Commandant of Auschwitz; December 1943 – 8 May 1944	Succeeded by SS-Obersturmbannführer Rudolf Höss
Preceded by SS-Obersturmbannführer Martin Gottfried Weiss	Commandant of Majdanek concentration camp 19 May 1944 – 22 July 1944	Succeeded by None
