= Josef Klehr =

German Nazi physician

- Klehr in custody of the Frankfurt Police
- Born: 17 October 1904; Langenau (now a part of Kietrz, Province of Silesia, German Empire
- Died: 23 August 1988 (aged 83); Leiferde, Lower Saxony, West Germany
- Military career
- Allegiance: Nazi Germany
- Branch: Schutzstaffel
- Rank: Oberscharführer, SS
- Conflicts: World War II
- Criminal information
- Status: Deceased
- Motive: Nazism
- Convictions: Murder (475 counts); Accessory to murder (2730 counts)
- Trial: Frankfurt Auschwitz Trials
- Penalty: Life imprisonment with hard labour

Details
- Victims: Thousands (possibly as high as 14,000)
- Span of crimes: 1941–1945
- Country: German-occupied Poland
- Location: Auschwitz concentration camp

Josef Klehr (17 October 1904 – 23 August 1988) was an SS-Oberscharführer (master sergeant), supervisor in several Nazi concentration camps and head of the SS disinfection commando at Auschwitz concentration camp.

== Life ==
Klehr was born as the son of a teacher. After attending the Volksschule in Wohlau until 1918 he got an apprenticeship with a cabinet maker, passing the exam in 1921 that allowed him to do it by trade. From 1934 he worked as a night porter in a community home, then subsequently as a nurse in a sanatorium. From 1938 he was assistant sergeant at Wohlau prison.

Klehr was a member of the Nazi Party and Allgemeine SS as of 1932. He participated in military exercises with the Wehrmacht and received training to become a medic. Shortly before the beginning of the war he was drafted into the Waffen-SS. In August 1939 he was transferred to Buchenwald concentration camp as a guard, then to Dachau concentration camp as a medical orderly a year later. In January 1941 he was promoted to SS-Unterscharführer and transferred to Auschwitz, working as a medical orderly in the prisoners' infirmary.

Klehr was renowned for killing by phenol injections into the heart, something he essentially took over at some point in 1942. He devised ways to optimise the speed of the killing process, such as experimenting with the positioning of prisoners before their injection.

Klehr occasionally conducted selections himself, and when he was informed that the camp doctor was unavailable, stated immediately, "Today I am the camp doctor." For example, on 29 August 1942, he and Friedrich Entress selected 746 prisoners to be gassed under the guise of fighting a typhus epidemic. Due to various descriptions of him standing against a background of corpses "wearing either a white coat or 'a pink-rubber apron and rubber gloves' and 'holding a 20-cc hypodermic with a long needle'" in his hands, Klehr has been described as the "ultimate caricature of the omnipotent Auschwitz doctor." He was infamous for his sadistic cruelty.

As told by Witold Pilecki, who had first hand knowledge of Klehr's operations in Auschwitz "They were not exclusively those seriously ill or exhausted. Some were here only because Klehr did not like them and put them down in the "needle list", there was no way out. The butchers were also different than in the beginning of the camp; nevertheless I do not know if they may be called degenerates. Klehr used to murder with his needle with great zeal, mad eyes and sadistic smile, he put a stroke on the wall after the killing of each victim. In my times, he brought the list of those killed by him up to the number fourteen thousand and he boasted every day with great delight, like a hunter who told of the trophies of the chase."

In 1943 Klehr became head of the disinfection squad (Desinfektionskommando). As a handler of Zyklon B his tasks included not only delousing living quarters and clothes, but direct involvement in the mass gassing of prisoners. He was one of those responsible for inserting the gas. He was present during selections where those incapable of working were sent to the gas chambers, and drew up a schedule as to who under him was to insert the Zyklon B.

On 20 April 1943 Klehr was awarded the War Merit Cross second class with swords. He was transferred to the Gleiwitz subcamp in 1944 where he was head of the prisoners' hospital and was medically responsible for Glewitz camps I to IV.

== After the war ==
Upon the evacuation of Auschwitz, Klehr guarded prisoners being transported to Gross-Rosen concentration camp, after which he was taken under command by an SS combat unit. In early May 1945, he was taken prisoner in Austria by U.S. soldiers. Klehr spent nearly three years in an internment camp. He was released from custody in April 1948. Klehr returned to his family in Braunschweig and resumed work as a cabinet maker. In April 1960 the Frankfurt prosecutor's office issued an arrest warrant which was executed in September after Klehr's whereabouts were determined.

On 19 August 1965, the court convicted him of murder in at least 475 cases, assistance in the joint murder of at least 2730 cases, and sentenced him to life imprisonment with an additional 15 years. A witness, surnamed Głowacki, testified in court that Klehr killed the women who survived the massacre after the alleged uprising at the Budy female subcamp by phenol injection.

At his trial, Klehr conceded that he had killed approximately 250 prisoners using phenol injections over a two month period. Klehr's defence argued that he conducted the injections on the orders of SS physician Friedrich Entress, and that he would have been shot if he did not do as commanded. Klehr maintained that he did not take part in gassings, but had observed them. The court rejected significant parts of Klehr's defence, finding that he had participated in gassings and independently selected prisoners for death.

While in prison, Klehr was interviewed by journalist and film-maker Ebbo Demant. When Demant brought up Holocaust denial, Klehr said:

Jews never gassed? No? Yes, I have already been asked about that. ...Three elderly ladies come to visit us here. That is such an official society. They always want to support us a little bit, to give us a present on our birthdays, and so on, and one of them asked me once if people were gassed in Auschwitz? I said – I will tell you openly and honestly, but if it were someone else, I would have answered that I did not know. But because it is you, I will tell you precisely, that people were gassed. And anyone who maintains that there were no gassings... Yes, I don't understand them, they must be crazy or in the wrong. ... When you are three, four years in Auschwitz and experienced everything, then I cannot get myself to lie about it and say that no gassings were ever conducted.

— Josef Klehr, "Auschwitz-"Direkt von der Rampe weg..."

After over 27 years in prison, on 25 January 1988, Klehr's sentence was suspended due to unfitness for custody (Vollzugsuntauglichkeit). On 10 June, he was ordered to serve the remainder on probation. In total, he had spent over 30 years in custody. After seven months of freedom, he died at age 83.

== Literature ==
- Demant, Ebbo (Hg.): Auschwitz — "Direkt von der Rampe weg…" Kaduk, Erber, Klehr: Drei Täter geben zu Protokoll: Hamburg: Rowohlt, 1979; ISBN 3-499-14438-7
- Ernst Klee: Das Personenlexikon zum Dritten Reich: Wer war was vor und nach 1945. Fischer-Taschenbuch-Verlag, Frankfurt am Main 2005; ISBN 3-596-16048-0
- Hermann Langbein: Menschen in Auschwitz. Frankfurt am Main, Berlin Wien, Ullstein-Verlag, 1980; ISBN 3-548-33014-2.
- Auschwitz-Birkenau State Museum: Auschwitz in den Augen der SS. Oswiecim 1998; ISBN 83-85047-35-2.
