= Supreme National Tribunal =

Polish supreme court for war crimes

The Supreme National Tribunal (Polish: Najwyższy Trybunał Narodowy; NTN) was a war-crime tribunal active in communist-era Poland from 1946 to 1948. Its aims and purpose were defined by the State National Council in decrees of 22 January and 17 October 1946 and 11 April 1947. The new law was based on an earlier decree of 31 August 1944 issued by the new Soviet-imposed Polish regime, with jurisdiction over "fascist-Hitlerite criminals and traitors to the Polish nation". The Tribunal presided over seven high-profile cases involving a total of 49 individuals.

== Background ==
Nazi Germany occupied Poland in 1939 and carried out many atrocities. The 1943 Moscow Declaration stated that Germans judged guilty of war crimes would be sent back to the countries where they had committed their crimes and "judged on the spot by the peoples whom they have outraged." Poland, which suffered heavily due to Nazi atrocities, identified over 12,000 criminals it requested to be extradited; eventually about 2,000 German criminals were extradited to Poland (from 1945 onwards, most before 1949).

The Polish Underground State had its own Special Courts in occupied Poland, which tried and passed sentences on some German war criminals. Communist Polish authorities (of the Polish Committee of National Liberation, PKWN) who did not recognize the Underground State (and in some cases actively persecuted people connected with it) established its own alternative structure, which with the victory of the communist authorities over the Underground State became dominant in post-war Poland. PKWN authorities authorized the establishment of the Special Criminal Courts on 12 September 1944 to try German war criminals. On 22 January 1946, the single-instance Supreme National Tribunal was formed, with a mission to try the main perpetrators of crimes committed by the Third Reich in the occupied Polish territories.

== Jurisdiction and powers ==
The jurisdiction and powers of the Tribunal were defined in decrees of 22 January and 17 October 1946 and a decree of 11 April 1947. The law applied was a decree of 31 August 1944 "concerning the punishment of fascist-Hitlerite criminals guilty of murder and ill-treatment of civilian population and of prisoners of war, and the punishment of traitors to the Polish Nation."

There was no appeal from the Tribunal's verdicts.

== Composition of the tribunal ==
The tribunal had three judges, four members of the jury, procurators and defenders.

The best known judge was Emil Stanisław Rappaport.

== Trials ==
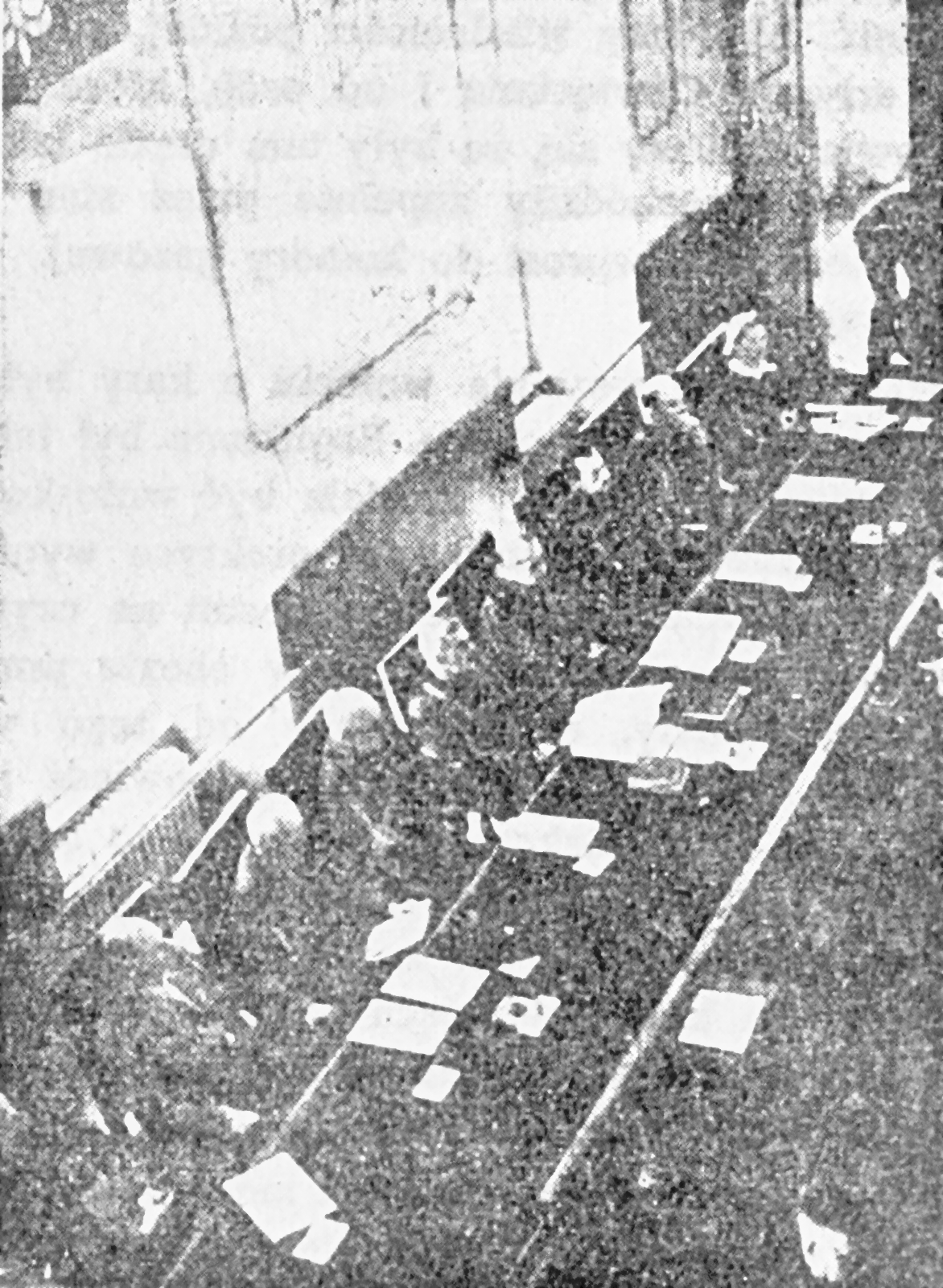
The full Supreme National Tribunal in the trial of Amon Göth, 1946

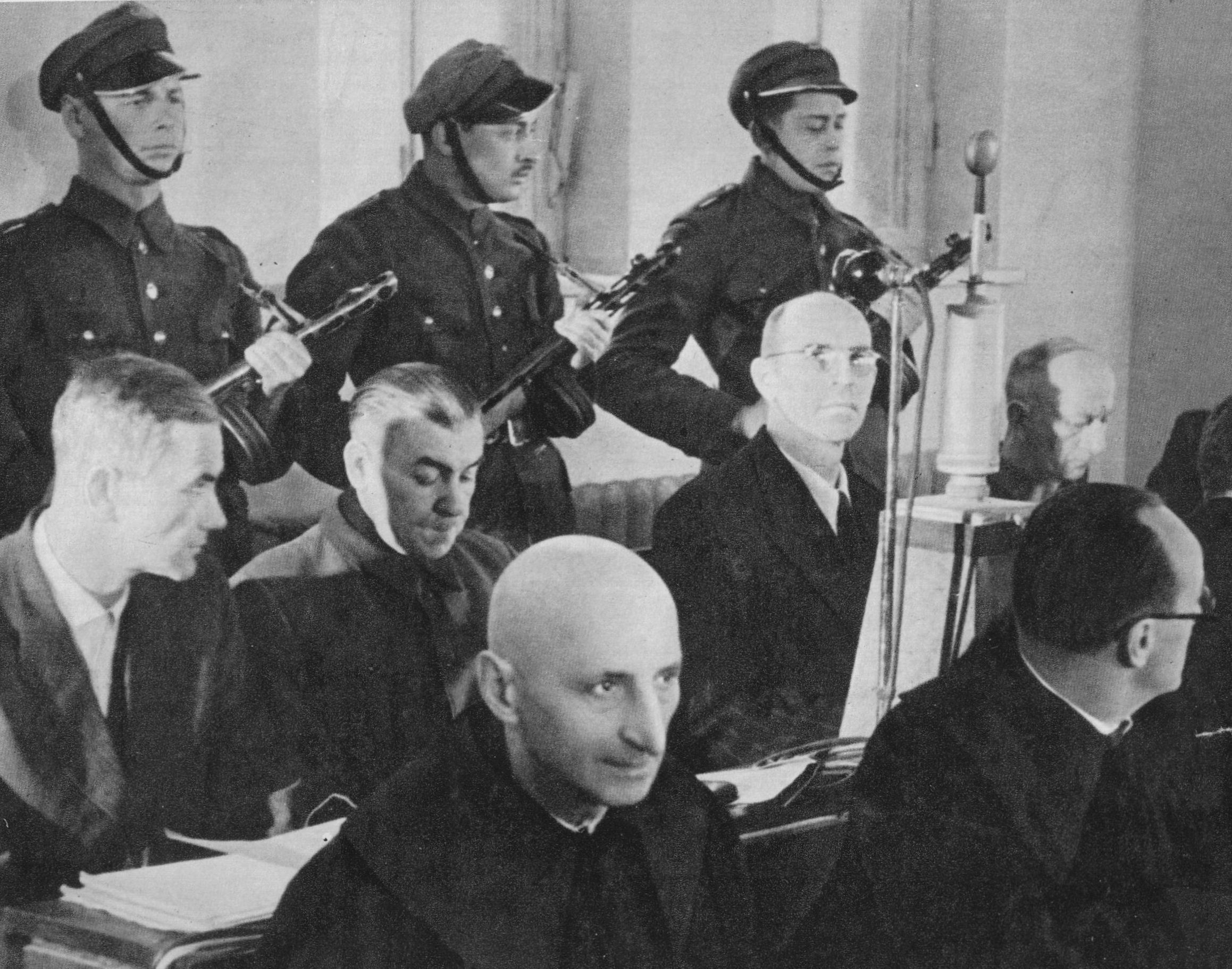
Warsaw Trial, 1946–1947

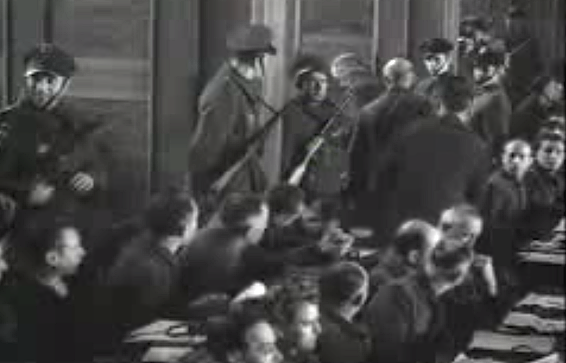
Auschwitz Trial, Kraków, 1947

Seven trials were brought before the Supreme National Tribunal in 1946–1948:

1. The trial of Arthur Greiser, head of the Free City of Danzig and later, governor of Reichsgau Wartheland
  Trial took place in Poznań, from 22 June to 7 July 1946.
  Sentence: Death, executed
2. The trial of Amon Göth, commander of the Kraków-Płaszów concentration camp
  Trial took place in Kraków, from 27 August to 5 September 1946.
  Sentence: Death, executed
3. The trial of Ludwig Fischer, Ludwig Leist, Josef Meisinger, Max Daume, all four high-ranking Nazi officials of occupied Warsaw
  Trial took place in Warsaw from 17 December 1946 to 24 February 1947
  Sentences: Fischer, Meisinger, Daume — Death, executed, Leist — 8 years
4. The trial of Rudolf Höss, one of the commanders of the Auschwitz concentration camp
  Trial took place in Warsaw from 11 March to 29 March 1947
  Sentence: Death, executed
5. The trial of 40 staff of the Auschwitz concentration camp (including one of the commanders, Arthur Liebehenschel).
  Trial (also known as the First Auschwitz Trial, with the Frankfurt Auschwitz Trials known as the Second Auschwitz Trial) took place in Kraków from 24 November to 16 December 1947
  Sentences: 23 death sentences (21 executed), 16 imprisonments from life sentences to 3 years of imprisonment, one person (Hans Münch) acquitted for humane behavior and enabling the survival of numerous patients.
6. The trial of Albert Forster, governor of Reichsgau Danzig-West Prussia
  Trial took place in Gdańsk from 5 April – 29 April 1948
  Sentence: Death, executed
7. The trial of Josef Bühler, state secretary and deputy governor to the General Government
  Trial took place in Kraków from 17 June – 5 July 1948
  Sentence: Death, executed

The first two of the above trials (of Greiser and Göth) were completed before the sentence was passed by the International Military Tribunal in Nuremberg on 30 September 1946.

The Tribunal also declared that the General Government was a criminal institution.

== See also ==
- Institute of National Remembrance
