= Wilhelm Gerstenmeier =

German member of the SS (1908–1944)

SS-Hauptsturmführer Wilhelm Gerstenmeier (17 January 1908 – 3 December 1944) was a German member of the SS (member number 13300) during World War II. He was convicted of atrocities committed at the Majdanek concentration camp in occupied Poland and hanged for war crimes on the grounds of the camp in 1944.

== Biography ==
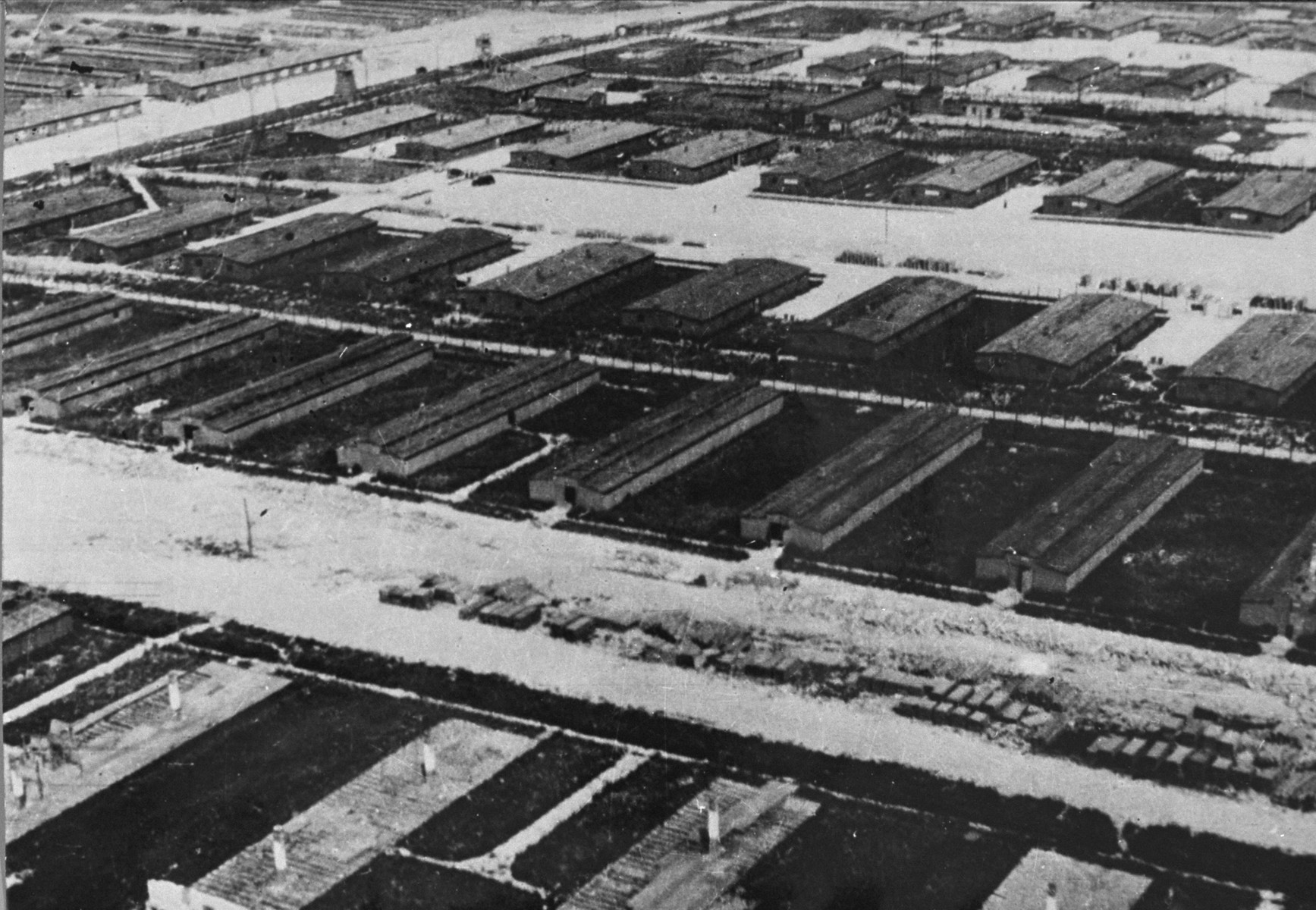
Reconnaissance photograph of the Majdanek concentration camp (24 June 1944) from the collections of the Majdanek Museum. In the upper half, functioning barracks

Gerstenmeier was born in Augsburg, Bavaria, a son of Karl Gerstenmeier and Elizabeth née Krippendorf. He was married with two children before the Nazi German invasion of Poland. While in Poland, he served as Master Sergeant in the Schutzstaffel squadron of the Waffen-SS and in 1941 was assigned as assistant to SS-Obersturmführer Anton Thernes, commandant of the Majdanek concentration camp administration in charge of slave labour, starvation rationing and maintenance of the camp structures. Gerstenmeier rose to the rank of Obersturmführer in Majdanek. He was a manager of the storage depot for property and valuables stolen from the victims at the killing centers in Belzec, Sobibor, and Treblinka. Gerstenmeier was also responsible for Zyklon B deliveries. During the mere 34 months of operation, more than 79,000 people perished at the main camp alone (59,000 of them Polish Jews).

Gerstenmeier was captured by the Soviets and arraigned before the courts on charges of war crimes at the First Majdanek Trial, which lasted from 27 November 1944 to 2 December 1944. He was sentenced to death by hanging and executed on 3 December 1944 along with Anton Thernes and five other war criminals close to the camp's gas chambers and crematorium.
