= Hermine Braunsteiner =

Austrian Nazi concentration camp guard (1919–1999)

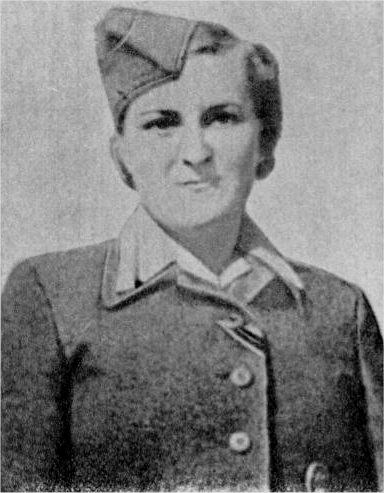
- Braunsteiner during her time in the SS
- Born: July 16, 1919; Vienna, Republic of German-Austria
- Died: April 19, 1999 (aged 79); Bochum, North Rhine-Westphalia, Germany
- Other names: Mare of Majdanek (Stute von Majdanek)
- Spouse: Russel Ryan
- Status: Deceased
- Motive: Nazism
- Convictions: Austria; Crimes against humanity West Germany; Murder (1080 counts); Accessory to murder (102 counts)
- Trial: Majdanek trials
- Penalty: Austria; 3 years imprisonment West Germany; Life imprisonment
- SS career
- Allegiance: Nazi Germany
- Branch: Schutzstaffel
- Service years: 1939–1945
- Rank: SS Helferin
- Awards: Kriegsverdienstkreuz 2. Klasse, 1943
- Other work: Hotel and restaurant worker Housewife

Hermine Braunsteiner Ryan (July 16, 1919 – April 19, 1999) was an Austrian SS Helferin and female camp guard at Ravensbrück and Majdanek concentration camps. She was the first Nazi war criminal to be extradited from the United States to face trial in West Germany. Braunsteiner was known to prisoners of Majdanek concentration camp as "the Mare" because she was said to have kicked and stomped on prisoners, thrown children by their hair onto trucks that took them to be murdered in gas chambers, hanged young prisoners, and beaten prisoners to death.

Braunsteiner was convicted for her complicity and collaborating in murders of over 1,000 people during the Holocaust. She was sentenced to life imprisonment by the District Court of Düsseldorf on April 30, 1981. She was released on health grounds in 1996, and died three years later.

== Early life ==
Braunsteiner was born in Vienna, the youngest of seven children in a strictly observant Roman Catholic family, variously described as petite bourgeoisie (kleinbürgerlich) or working class. Her father, Friedrich Braunsteiner, was a butcher and a chauffeur for a brewery owner, while her mother was a washwoman and custodian. She was raised under impoverished circumstances in the Nußdorf suburb of Döbling.

Braunsteiner graduated from Hauptschule in 1933 with aspirations to become a nurse. Due to the death of her father in 1934, however, she was required to find employment to support the family and thus unable to enter nursing school. Braunsteiner worked as a maid, mostly in Vienna, though she briefly moved to live with relatives in the Netherlands for three months in summer 1936. Upon her return, she was hired as an assembly worker at the brewery her father formerly worked for.

=== Anschluss ===
From 1937 to May 1938, Braunsteiner worked in London for an American engineer's household, but returned to Austria following the Anschluss, fearing possible internment by the British government in the event of war. Having become a German citizen through the annexation, Braunsteiner filed a request to undergo nurse training with the Blaue Schwesternschaft in Berlin, to no success. In August of the same year, she relocated to Germany for a job at a munition factory in Grüneberg before moving to Berlin to work at the Heinkel aircraft works.

== World War II ==
=== Camp guard at Ravensbrück ===
Unsatisfied with the menial labour, Braunsteiner found out through her landlord, a Fürstenberg police officer, that the recently established Ravensbrück concentration camp had open contractual positions for female supervisors (Aufseherinnen), with a weekly salary of 64 mark, quadruple her current income. She began her training at Ravensbrück on August 15, 1939, under Maria Mandl, receiving the service number 38. She remained there after the start of World War II, and the influx of new prisoners from occupied countries. After three years, a disagreement with Mandl led Braunsteiner to request a transfer in October 1942.

=== Majdanek and Alter Flughafen ===
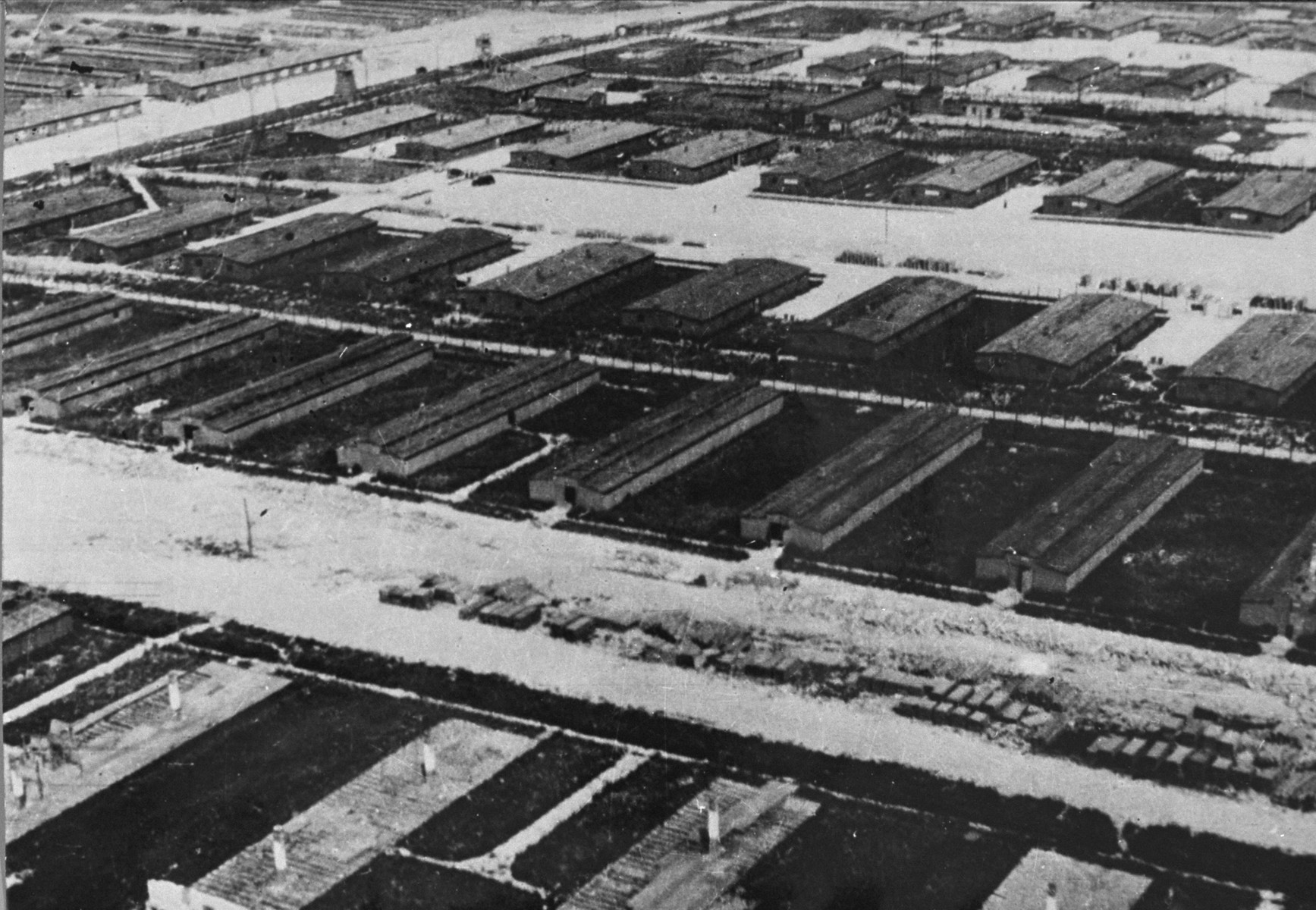
Aerial photo of the Majdanek concentration camp from the collections of the Majdanek Museum

On October 16, 1942, Braunsteiner assumed her duties in the forced-labor apparel factory near the Majdanek concentration camp, established near Lublin, Poland, a year earlier. It was both a labour camp (Arbeitslager) and an extermination camp (Vernichtungslager) with gas chambers and crematoria. She was promoted to assistant wardress in January 1943, under Oberaufseherin Elsa Ehrich along with five other camp guards. By then most of the Aufseherinnen had been moved into Majdanek from the Alter Flughafen labor camp.

Braunsteiner had a number of roles in the camp. She involved herself in "selections" of women and children to be sent to the gas chambers and whipped several women to death. Working alongside other female guards such as Elsa Ehrich, Hildegard Lächert, Marta Ulrich, Alice Orlowski, Charlotte Karla Mayer-Woellert, Erna Wallisch and Elisabeth Knoblich, Braunsteiner became known for her wild rages and tantrums. She was noted for her particularly cruel treatment of children, whom she called "useless eaters", regularly punishing them for minor infractions such as wearing stockings and pillows for warmth or incorrectly sewing their identification numbers to clothes, and in one instance, she beat a group of starved children with a ladle for coming too early for food distribution. One witness at her later trial in Düsseldorf described an incident where a prisoner had concealed his child inside a backpack and upon Braunsteiner seeing movement in the bag, she whipped the child for several minutes before personally dragging her to the gas chamber. Other survivors testified how she killed women by stomping on them with her steel-studded jackboots, earning her the nickname "The Stomping Mare" (In Polish "Kobyła", in German "Stute"). For her work, she received the War Merit Cross, 2nd class, in 1943.

=== Ravensbrück again and the Genthin Subcamp ===
In January 1944, Braunsteiner was ordered back to Ravensbrück as Majdanek began evacuations due to the approaching front line. She was promoted to supervising wardress at the Genthin subcamp of Ravensbrück, located outside Berlin. Witnesses say that she abused many of the prisoners with a horsewhip she carried, killing at least two women with it. A French physician who was interned at Genthin recalled the sadism of Braunsteiner while she ruled the camp: "I watched her administer twenty-five lashes with a riding crop to a young Russian girl suspected of having tried sabotage. Her back was full of lashes, but I was not allowed to treat her immediately."

== Post-war ==
On May 7, 1945, Braunsteiner fled the camp ahead of the Soviet Red Army. She then returned to Vienna, where Austrian police arrested Braunsteiner a year later on May 6, 1946, and turned her over to the British military occupation authorities. She was held in various internment camps until April 18, 1947. Braunsteiner was re-arrested by Austrian officials on April 7, 1948.

On November 22, 1949, the Austrian People's Court in Graz convicted Braunsteiner of crimes against human dignity for non-fatal abuse in Ravensbrück, but acquitted of her crimes in Majdanek, including murder, due to a lack of witnesses. Braunsteiner was sentenced to three years in prison and had her property confiscated. With credit for time served, she was released from prison on 26 April 1950, having served four months. Braunsteiner was told that she would not face further prosecution, and was later granted partial amnesty in 1957. She worked at low-level jobs in hotels and restaurants in Carinthia until emigrating.

=== Emigration and marriage ===
American national Russell Ryan met Braunsteiner whilst working as a US Air Force mechanic stationed in Germany. They married in October 1958, after they had emigrated to Nova Scotia, Canada. She entered the United States in April 1959, becoming an American citizen on January 19, 1963. They lived in Maspeth, Queens, New York City, where she was known as a fastidious housewife with a friendly manner, married to a construction worker.

=== Discovery ===
Nazi hunter Simon Wiesenthal picked up on her trail by chance on a visit to Tel Aviv. He was at a restaurant there when he received a call from his friend that he could not make it to their luncheon. The maître d'hôtel announced the "phone call for Mr. Wiesenthal" and this led to his recognition by the other patrons, who stood up to applaud him. When he returned to his table, there were several Majdanek survivors waiting who told him about Braunsteiner and what she had done. Based on this information he followed her trail from Vienna to Halifax, Nova Scotia, and then, via Toronto, to Queens. In 1964, Wiesenthal alerted The New York Times that Braunsteiner might have married a man named Ryan and might live in the Maspeth area of the Borough of Queens in New York City. They assigned Joseph Lelyveld, then a young reporter, to find "Mrs. Ryan". They first lived at 54–44 82nd Street in western Elmhurst and moved to 52–11 72nd Street in Maspeth. He found her at the second doorbell he rang and later wrote that she greeted him at her front doorstep and said: "My God, I knew this would happen. You've come."

Braunsteiner stated that she had been at Majdanek only a year, eight months of that time in the camp infirmary. "My wife, sir, wouldn't hurt a fly," said Ryan. "There's no more decent person on this earth. She told me this was a duty she had to perform. It was a conscriptive service." On August 22, 1968, United States authorities sought to revoke Braunsteiner's citizenship, since she had failed to disclose her convictions for war crimes; she was denaturalized in 1971 after entering into a consent judgment to avoid deportation. In 1972, vigilantes firebombed a home where they mistakenly thought Braunsteiner was living.

=== Extradition ===
A prosecutor in Düsseldorf began investigating Braunsteiner's wartime behavior, and in 1973 the West German government requested her extradition, accusing her of joint responsibility in the death of 200,000 people. On March 22, 1973, Braunsteiner was taken into custody as she awaited deportation. She was held at Rikers Island, then at the Nassau County Jail.

The United States court denied procedural claims that her denaturalization had been invalid (U.S. citizens could not be extradited to West Germany), and that the charges alleged political offenses committed by a non-German outside West Germany. Later, it rejected claims of lack of probable cause and double jeopardy. During the next year, she sat with her husband in United States district court in Queens, hearing survivors' testimony against the former Schutzstaffel (SS) guard. They described whippings and fatal beatings. Rachel Berger, alone among the witnesses, testified she would celebrate retribution against the former vice-commandant of the women's camp at Majdanek.

The judge certified her extradition to the Secretary of State on May 1, 1973, and on August 7, 1973, Hermine Braunsteiner Ryan became the first Nazi war criminal extradited from the United States to West Germany.

== Trial in West Germany ==
Braunsteiner was remanded into custody in Düsseldorf on August 7, 1973, until her husband posted bail on April 7, 1976. However, she returned to custody on December 8, 1977, after attempting to intimidate witnesses, and remained there until January 9, 1978. The West German court rejected Ryan's arguments that it lacked jurisdiction, because she was not a German national but Austrian, and that the alleged offences had occurred outside Germany. It ruled she had been a German citizen at the time and more importantly had been a German government official acting in the name of the German Reich.

She stood trial in West Germany with 15 other former SS men and women from Majdanek. One of the witnesses against Braunsteiner testified that she "seized children by their hair and threw them on trucks heading to the gas chambers". Others spoke of vicious beatings. One witness told of Braunsteiner and the steel-studded jackboots with which she dealt blows to inmates. Braunsteiner had two recorded screaming fits during the trial and accused a witness of lying during a break.

The third Majdanek trial (Majdanek-Prozess in German) was held in Düsseldorf. Beginning on November 26, 1975, and lasting 474 sessions, it was the longest and most expensive trial in West Germany. The defendants included Ryan, former SS guard Hermann Hackmann and camp doctor Heinrich Schmidt. The court found insufficient evidence on six counts of the indictment and convicted her on three counts: the murder of 80 people, abetting the murder of 102 children, and collaborating in the murder of 1,000 people. On June 30, 1981, the court imposed a life sentence, a more severe punishment than those meted out to her co-defendants.

== Death ==
In 1996, complications of diabetes, including a leg amputation, led to her release from Mülheimer women's prison. Hermine Braunsteiner Ryan died on April 19, 1999, aged 79, in Bochum, Germany.

After the publicity surrounding Ryan's extradition, the United States government established in 1979 a U.S. DOJ Office of Special Investigations to seek out war criminals to denaturalize or deport. It took jurisdiction previously held by the Immigration and Naturalization Service.

== In popular culture ==
The novel The Mare by Angharad Hampshire is based on Hermine Braunsteiner's life. It was first published by Northodox Press in 2024, was shortlisted for the Walter Scott Prize for Historical Fiction in 2025, and was republished by Penguin Hamish Hamilton in August, 2026. The Housewife, a film based on Hermine's life in America, premiered in September 2026.
