= Maurice Pasternak =

Belgian artist and engraver

- Born: 22 December 1946 (age 79); Bruxelles (Belgique)
- Education: École Nationale Supérieure des Arts Visuels de La Cambre (Brussels, Belgium)
- Known for: Artiste, graveur et dessinateur
- Website: http://www.mauricepasternak.be/

Maurice Pasternak (born 1946 in Brussels) is a Belgian artist, engraver and drawer.

His work is essentially focused on mezzotint technique. He also develops drawing artworks, with various techniques: pastel, wax and pigments, and graphite.

Human relationships are at the very core of his work.

== Career ==
Until 2010s, his work mainly consists of engravings and pastels.

The topic of space, deeply linked to the particular use of perspective: objective and subjective as well as to the different light sources

The graphite technique enabled him to articulate various themes (subjects) through changing handwriting on the legible limits

His work expresses an intemporality of intention, and is profoundly imbued with its existential questioning

== Collections ==
- Cabinets des Estampes de Bruxelles et Liège.
- Collections de l’État belge.
- Banque Nationale de Belgique.
- Centre de la Gravure et de l'Image Imprimé de la Fédération Wallonie-Bruxelles, à La Louvière, Belgique.
- Musée de Cracovie, Musée de Majdanek, Pologne.
- Musée d’Art Moderne de Taipei, Taïwan R.O.C.
- Musée d’Art Moderne de Stockholm, Suède.
- Musée de la Gravure, Allemagne.
- The New Orleans Museum of Art, USA.
- Warnock Fine Arts, Canada.
- Museum and collection from University of Alberta, Edmonton, Canada.
- Yamanashi Prefectural Museum of Art, Japon.
