= Elsa Ehrich =

Nazi war criminal (1914–1948)

Else Ehrich
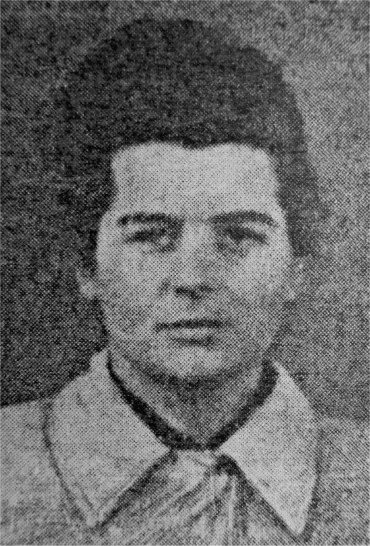
- Ehrich at the Majdanek Trials, 1946
- Born: 8 March 1914; Bredereiche, Grand Duchy of Mecklenburg-Strelitz, German Empire
- Died: 26 October 1948 (aged 34); Lublin, Polish People's Republic
- Cause of death: Execution by hanging
- Other name: Elsa Ehrich
- Occupation: Camp guard
- Employer: SS
- Political party: Nazi Party
- Status: Executed
- Conviction: Crimes against humanity
- Trial: Majdanek trials
- Penalty: Death

Else Lieschen Frida "Elsa" Ehrich (8 March 1914 – 26 October 1948) was a German convicted war criminal who acted as a female camp guard in Nazi concentration camps, including at Kraków-Płaszów and the Majdanek concentration camp during World War II. She was tried in Lublin, Poland at the Majdanek Trials and sentenced to death for war crimes. Ehrich was hanged on 26 October 1948.

She was an Oberaufseherin of the women's section at Majdanek, and took active part in all the major selections to the gas chambers and executions. She maltreated prisoners, including children. Her assistant was Hermine Braunsteiner, who was later denaturalized and deported from the United States back to Germany.

== Early life ==
Ehrich was born in Bredereiche to an Evangelical family. After her baptism at St.-Martin-Church Bredereiche, her name was misspelled as "Elsa" in the church registry. She finished Volksschule and worked in a slaughterhouse as a teenager.

== World War II ==
On 15 August 1940, Elrich volunteered for service in Ravensbrück concentration camp as a SS-Gefolge guard. In summer 1942, she was promoted to SS-Rapportführerin (Rapport Leader).

In October 1942, she was transferred to Majdanek near Lublin, where after some time she was promoted to SS-Oberaufseherin. She was under the SS command in the camp. During the 34 months of camp operation, more than 79,000 prisoners were murdered at the main camp alone (59,000 of them Polish Jews) and between 95,000 and 130,000 people in the entire Majdanek system of subcamps. On 3 November 1943, around 18,000 Jews were killed at Majdanek during the largest single-day, single-camp massacre of the Holocaust, named Operation Harvest Festival (totaling 43,000 with 2 subcamps).

Ehrich is believed responsible for the death of thousands of prisoners (including in gas chambers), from the women's section of the camp with children. One survivor has described how when sick prisoners were loaded into a cart in just their underwear, she threw a blanket over them. Elrich pulled the blanket off, lashed her with a whip and told her not to waste hospital property.

In February 1943, Ehrich became ill due to typhoid. On 5 April 1944, she was the Oberaufseherin in the Kraków-Płaszów concentration camp, and from June 1944 to April 1945, she was assigned to Neuengamme.

== Trial and execution ==
After the war, in May 1945, she was arrested by British occupation authorities in Hamburg, who transferred her to U.S. custody in the camp for war criminals PWE29 in Dachau, where she shared the cell with Maria Mandl. She was transferred to the Polish authorities. In 1948, she stood before the District Court of Lublin at the second Majdanek Trials, accused of committing war crimes and crimes against humanity.

Ehrich was found guilty of the allegations and on 10 June 1948, was condemned to death by hanging. After the announcement of the judgment, she asked Polish President Bolesław Bierut for clemency, on the grounds that she had a small son and wanted to atone for her guilt. President Bierut rejected the request. Ehrich was executed on 26 October 1948 in Lublin Prison.
