= Majdanek trials =

War crime trials after World War II

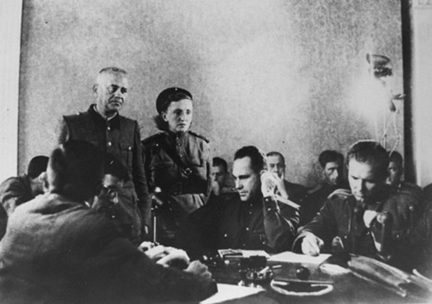
- Former SS-Obersturmbannfuehrer Anton Thernes (standing, left) in front of a penal court on trial for crimes committed at Majdanek, 1944, Lublin, Poland
- Submitted: November 27, 1944
- Decided: June 30, 1981, Düsseldorf

The case of the Majdanek death camp

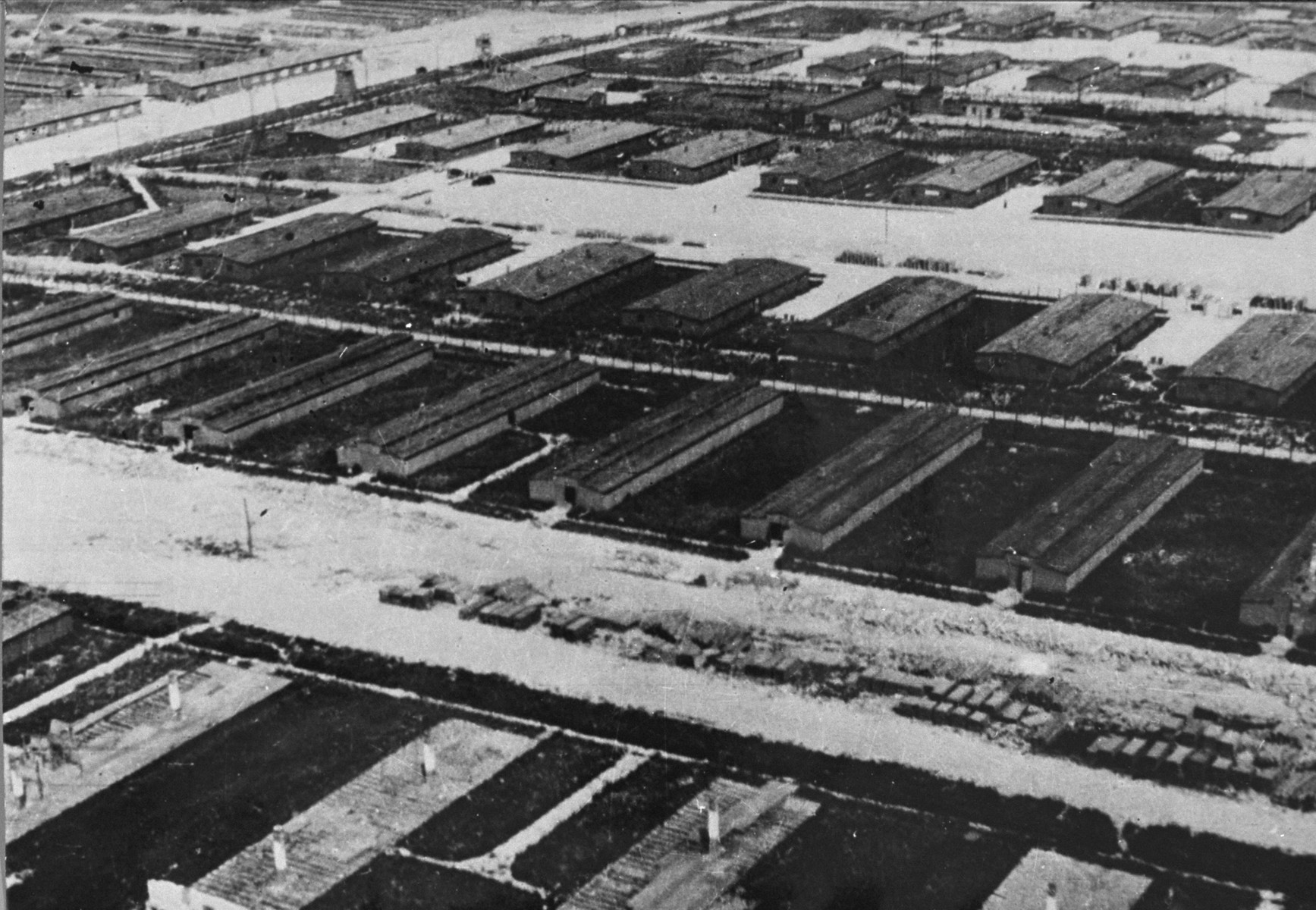
Majdanek concentration camp (June 24, 1944) from the collections of the Majdanek Museum, lower half: the barracks under deconstruction; in the upper half, functioning barracks

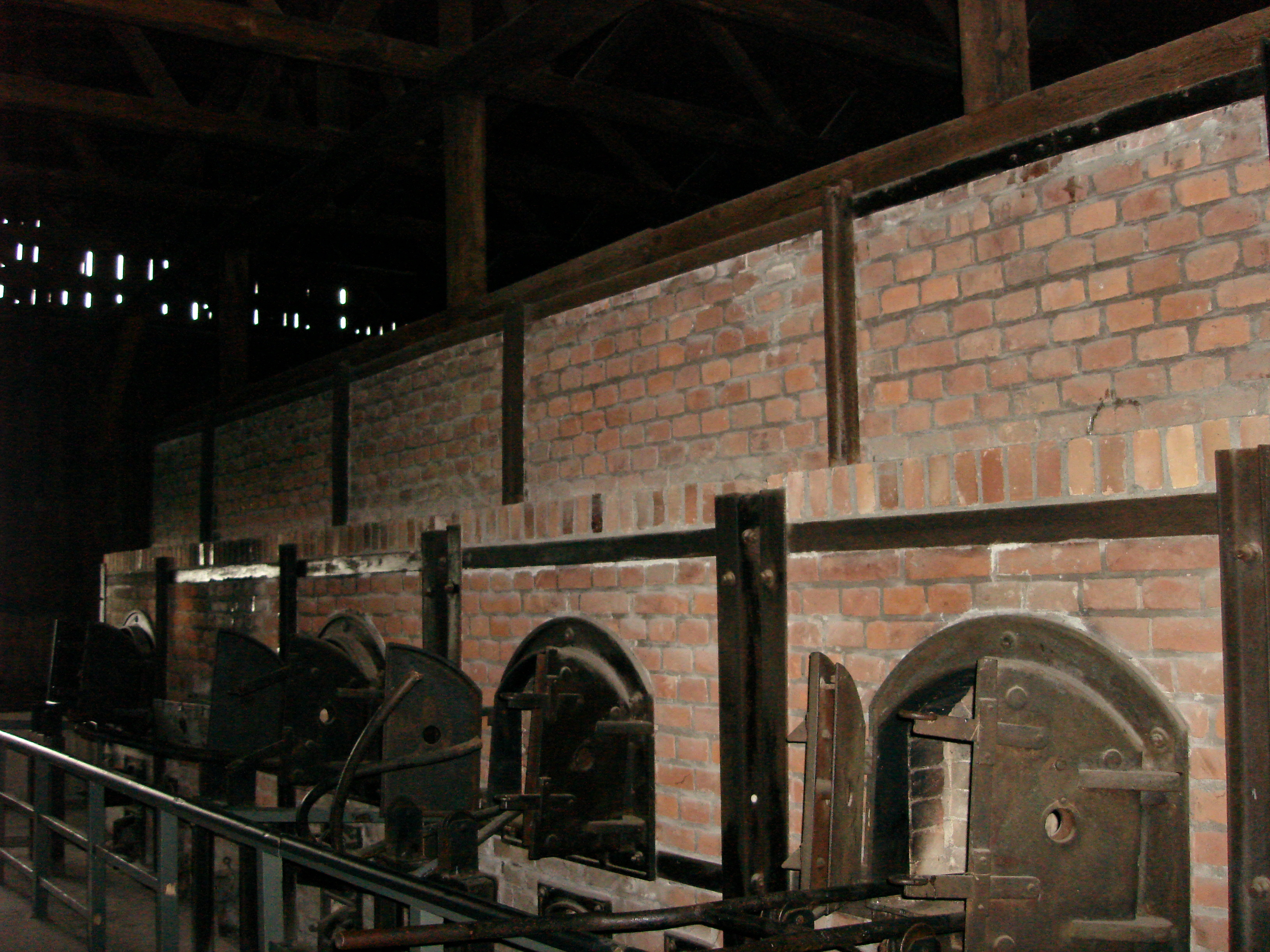
Preserved original ovens in the second Crematorium at Majdanek, built in 1943 by Heinrich Kori.

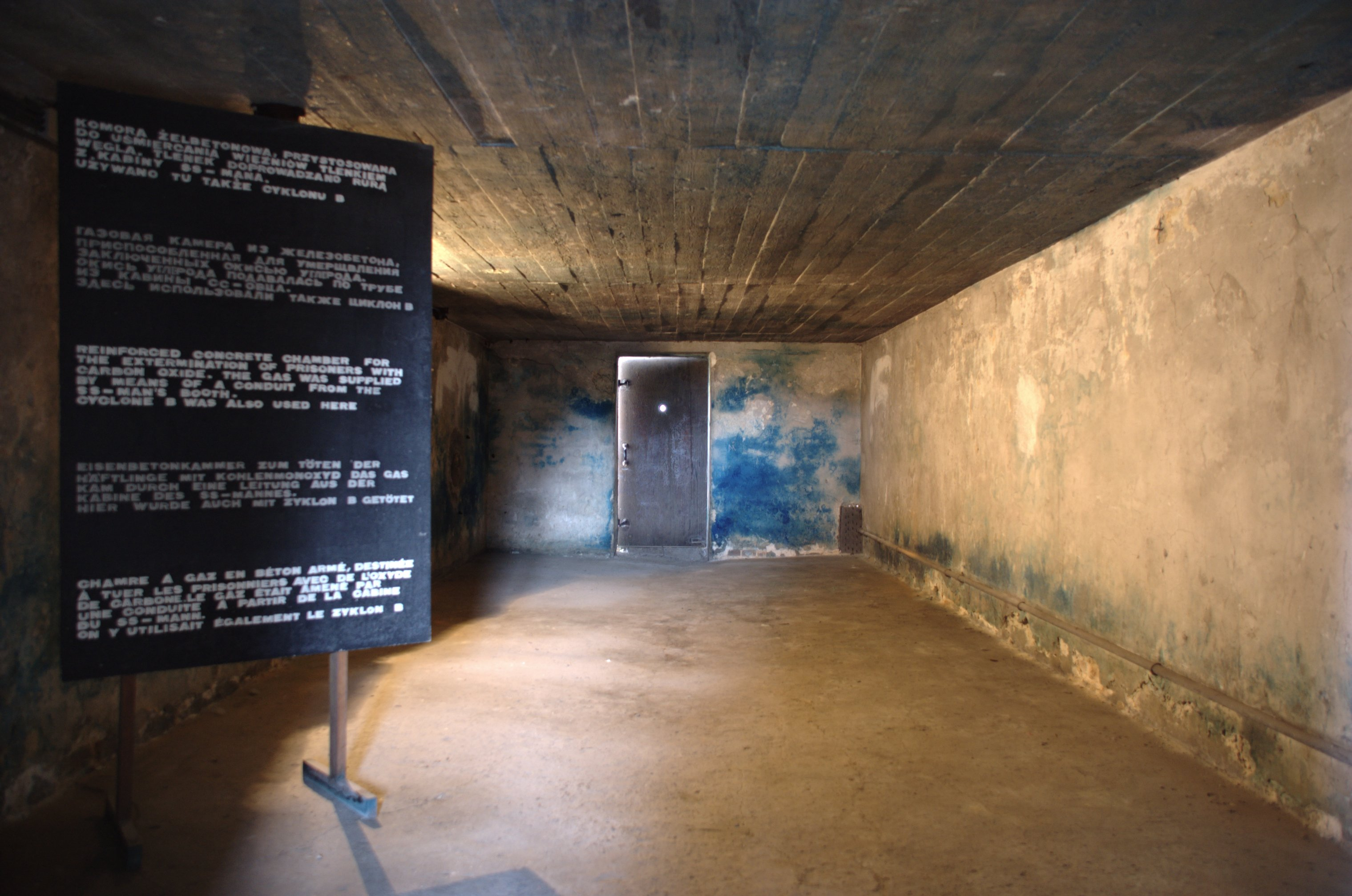
Original gas chamber with visible Zyklon B blue stain on the back wall, permanently burned into the cement

The Majdanek trials were a series of consecutive war-crime trials held in Poland and in Germany during and after World War II, constituting the overall longest Nazi war crimes trial in history spanning over 30 years. The first judicial trial of Majdanek extermination camp officials took place from November 27, 1944, to December 2, 1944, in Lublin, Poland. The last one, held at the District Court of Düsseldorf began on November 26, 1975, and concluded on June 30, 1981. It was West Germany's longest and most expensive trial, lasting 474 sessions.

Numerous former high ranking SS men, camp officials, camp guards, and SS staff were arraigned before the courts on charges of war crimes and crimes against humanity committed at Majdanek in the period between October 1, 1941, and July 22, 1944; in all, 170 of the 1,037 SS personnel who worked there were prosecuted. Half of the defendants charged by the West German justice system were acquitted of killing. By contrast, those tried earlier by Poland were usually found guilty. During the 34 months of camp operation, more than 79,000 people were murdered at Majdanek main camp alone (59,000 of them Polish Jews) and between 95,000 and 130,000 people in the entire Majdanek, system including several subcamps. Some 18,000 Jews were killed at Majdanek on November 3, 1943, during the largest single-day, single-camp massacre of the Holocaust, named Harvest Festival (totalling 43,000 with 2 subcamps).

Notably, two KL Majdanek concentration camp commandants were put on trial by the SS themselves in the course of the camp operation, partly because Majdanek was initially merely a storage depot for gold, money and furs stolen from trainloads of Holocaust victims at murder factories in Belzec, Sobibor, and Treblinka. Both SS men were charged with wholesale stealing from the Third Reich to become rich. Karl-Otto Koch (serving at Majdanek from July 1941 till August 24, 1942) was executed by firing squad on April 5, 1945; Hermann Florstedt, the third chief of Majdanek (from October 1942 on) was executed by the SS on April 15, 1945.

== First Majdanek trial ==
Retreating Germans did not have time to destroy the facility. It remained the best preserved example of a Holocaust death camp in history, with intact gas chambers and crematoria. The advancing Soviets were the first Allied soldiers to see the gas chambers, and initially overestimated the total number of victims.

A group of six members of Majdanek personnel – who had not managed to escape – were arraigned before the Soviet-Polish Special Criminal Court immediately following the camp's liberation of July 23, 1944. They were SS-Obersturmführer Anton Thernes, SS-Hauptsturmführer Wilhelm Gerstenmeier, SS-Oberscharführer Hermann Vögel, Kapo Edmund Pohlmann, SS-Rottenführer Theodor Schöllen and Kapo Heinrich Stalp. After the trial, and deliberations, which lasted from November 27, 1944 to December 2, 1944, all of accused, except for Pohlmann, who had committed suicide on November 28, were found guilty of war crimes and sentenced to death by hanging. They were all hanged on December 3, 1944. According to the JTA -"Butcher of Madjanek" Paul Hoffman was executed on or around Dec 1945

== Second Majdanek trial (1946–1948) ==
The series of trials which took place between 1946 and 1948 in Poland – usually referred to as the Second trial of Majdanek – consisted of trials of many kinds. Some 95 SS-men, mostly guards (including those apprehended hiding in postwar Germany), were charged with war crimes and crimes against humanity. Seven of the defendants were given the death penalty. The most prominent of them was Elsa Ehrich, Oberaufseherin of the women and children camp division (liquidated in spring of 1944). She was responsible for the selections to gas chambers. Ehrich was found guilty of all charges, and hanged in July 1948. Apparently, Ehrich made an attempt to launch a Nazi brothel in 1943, but the project was abandoned before fruition after one of her slave sex-workers was diagnosed with typhus.

Most other SS men were sentenced from 2 to 12 years' imprisonment. Some of the more prominent defendants in the 1946–1948 series of trials included over 60 SS-Schütze camp guards. The multiple proceedings were held in Lublin, as well as in Radom and Świdnica (1947), Kraków, Wadowice, and Toruń (1948) and in Warsaw (1948), where the last appellate court case of Jacob Gemmel took place in November 1950.

Defendant	Born	Rank	Function	Sentence
Elsa Ehrich	Mar. 8, 1914	Oberaufseherin	Senior Overseer	Death by hanging (carried out, Oct. 26, 1948)
Friedrich Gebhardt	Feb. 26, 1899	SS-Unterscharf.	Camp guard	Death by hanging (carried out, Nov. 15, 1948)
Kurt Möller (Moeller)	Jan. 11, 1918	SS-Oberscharf.	Squad leader	Death by hanging (carried out, Oct. 6, 1948)
Jacob Niessner	Jan. 19, 1908	SS-Schütze	Camp guard	Death by hanging (carried out, Jul. 14, 1948)
Michael Pelger	Mar. 27, 1908	SS-Rottenf.	Squad leader	Death by hanging (carried out, Jun. 18, 1948)
Peter Reiss	Feb. 22, 1901	SS-Sturmmann	Stormtrooper	Death by hanging (carried out, Jun. 23, 1948)
Franz Söss (Süss)	Nov. 30, 1912	SS-Rottenf.	Squad leader	Death by hanging (carried out, Sept. 20, 1949)
Friedrich Buschbaum	Sept. 14, 1904	SS-Schütze	Camp guard	Death by hanging (commuted to 15 years imprisonment, rel. May 31, 1956)
Johann Weiss	Feb. 24, 1915	SS-Schütze	Camp guard	Death by hanging (commuted to 10 years imprisonment)
Johann Vormittag	Aug. 5, 1904	SS-Schütze	Camp guard	life imprisonment (released Mar. 11, 1959)
Jacob Gemmel	May 27, 1913	SS-Schütze	Camp guard	life (commuted to 12 years imprisonment)
Robert Frick	Oct. 15, 1918	SS-Unterscharf.	Camp guard	15 years imprisonment (released May 2, 1956)
Georg Fleischer	Nov. 24, 1911	SS-Schütze	Camp guard	12 years imprisonment (released May 2, 1956)
Johann Kessler	Feb. 28, 1910	SS-Sturmmann	Stormtrooper	12 years imprisonment (died in prison, Feb. 25, 1951)
Hans Kottre (Kotre)	Aug. 22, 1912	SS-Sturmmann	Stormtrooper	12 years imprisonment (released May 9, 1956)
Andreas Lahner	Dec. 10, 1921	SS-Sturmmann	Stormtrooper	12 years imprisonment (released May 2, 1956)
Georg Neu	Aug. 1, 1921	SS-Schütze	Camp guard	12 years imprisonment (released May 9, 1956)
Franz Wirth	Nov. 8, 1909	SS-Rottenf.	Camp guard	12 years imprisonment
Andreas Buttinger	May 29, 1910	SS-Schütze	Camp guard	10 years imprisonment (died in prison, Apr. 26, 1949)
Jacob Jost	Oct. 6, 1895	SS-Oberscharf.	Camp guard	10 years imprisonment (released Apr. 30, 1956)
Martin Löx	Feb. 7, 1908	SS-Rottenf.	Camp guard	10 years imprisonment (died in prison, Jun. 26, 1949)
Kasper Marksteiner	Nov. 1, 1913	SS-Sturmmann	Camp guard	10 years imprisonment (died in prison, Jun. 20, 1949)
Hans Aufmuth	Jan. 18, 1905	SS-Schütze	Camp guard	8 years imprisonment (released Mar. 17, 1954)
Johann Betz	Dec. 18, 1906	SS-Sturmmann	Camp guard	8 years imprisonment (released Jul. 3, 1955)
Anton Hoffmann	Sept. 17, 1910	SS-Sturmmann	Camp guard	8 years imprisonment (released Dec. 17, 1954)
Johann Radler	Sept. 9, 1909	SS-Schütze	Camp guard	8 years imprisonment (released Mar. 1, 1955)
Thomas Radrich	Oct. 19, 1912	SS-Rottenf.	Camp guard	8 years imprisonment
Johann Setz	Jun. 26, 1907	SS-Sturmman	Camp guard	8 years imprisonment (extradited to Germany, Feb. 28, 1955)
Michael Bertl	Jun. 23, 1909	SS-Sturmmann	Camp guard	7 years imprisonment (released Jul. 15, 1954)
Paul Keller	Oct. 16, 1910	SS-Sturmmann	Camp guard	7 years imprisonment (released Jul. 15, 1954)
Karl Müller	Mar. 10, 1907	SS-Sturmmann	Block leader	7 years imprisonment
Walter Biernat	Mar. 28, 1920	SS-Rottenf.	Camp guard	6 years imprisonment (died in prison, Feb. 6, 1952)
Josef Hartmann	Mar. 22, 1918	SS-Sturmmann	Camp guard	6 years imprisonment (released Jan. 5, 1954)
Hans Georg Hess	Jun. 17, 1910	SS-Rottenf.	Camp guard	6 years imprisonment
Heinrich Kühn	Dec. 16, 1909	SS-Sturmmann	Guard (Auschwitz)	6 years imprisonment (died in prison, Apr. 16, 1951)
Franz Vormittag	Jan. 23, 1920	SS-Sturmmann	Camp guard	6 years imprisonment
Helmut Zach	Aug. 19, 1909	SS-Unterscharf.	Camp guard	6 years imprisonment
Jacob Dialler	Dec. 8, 1913	SS-Sturmmann	Camp guard	5 years imprisonment (released Dec. 23, 1951)
Hans Durst	Nov. 23, 1909	SS-Rottenf.	Camp guard	5 years imprisonment
Franz Kaufmann	Jul. 23, 1908	SS-Unterscharf.	Camp guard	5 years imprisonment
Paul Kiss	Jul. 13, 1902	SS-Sturmmann	Camp guard	5 years imprisonment (died Apr. 26, 1950)
Johann Kubasak	Dec. 31, 1909	SS-Rottenf.	Camp guard	5 years imprisonment
Johann Lassner	Jul. 26, 1909	SS-Schütze	Camp guard	5 years imprisonment
Johann Lienert	Aug. 5, 1915	SS-Sturmmann	Camp guard	5 years imprisonment (died Jun. 16, 1949)
Stefan Mantsch	Sept. 24, 1922	SS-Schütze	Camp guard	5 years imprisonment (released Apr. 12, 1951)
Hans Merle	May 15, 1914	SS-Schütze	Camp guard	5 years imprisonment (released Jan. 2, 1953)
Kurt Erwin Ohnweiler	Mar. 25, 1913	SS-Schütze	Camp guard	5 years imprisonment (released Mar. 1, 1952)
Michael Thal	Jan. 16, 1910	SS-Schütze	Camp guard	5 years imprisonment
Jacob Vormittag	Mar. 8, 1909	SS-Sturmman	Camp guard	5 years imprisonment
Martin Berger	Jan. 18, 1910	SS-Rottenf.	Camp guard	4 years imprisonment (died in prison, Oct. 15, 1948)
Michael Fleischer	Aug. 18, 1912	SS-Rottenf.	Camp guard	4 years imprisonment
Franz Habel	May 31, 1912	SS-Rottenf.	Camp guard	4 years imprisonment
Karl Brückner	May 5, 1904	SS-Unterscharf.	Camp guard	4 years imprisonment (released Feb. 28, 1951)
Josef Janowitsch	Aug. 22, 1910	SS-Sturmmann	Camp guard	4 years imprisonment
Johann Günesch	May 17, 1913	SS-Schütze	Camp guard	3.5 years imprisonment (extradited to Germany, Feb. 9, 1951)
Fritz Frischolz	Oct. 5, 1911	SS-Oberscharf.	Camp guard	8 years imprisonment (released Mar. 10, 1955)
Michael Gall	Jul. 22, 1902	SS-Schütze	Camp guard	3 years imprisonment (extradited to Germany, Jan. 15, 1951)
Hans Grabert	May 31, 1907	SS-Oberscharf	Administration	3 years imprisonment (extradited to Germany, Jun. 16, 1950)
Stefan Mantsch	Sept. 24, 1922	SS-Schütze	Camp guard	3 years imprisonment (released Apr. 12, 1951)
Josef Moos	Jan. 24, 1904	SS-Rottenf.	Infirmary (selections)	3 years imprisonment (died in prison, Apr. 20, 1950)
Konrad Anacker	Feb. 13, 1892	SS-Schütze	Camp guard	3 years imprisonment (released Jun. 26, 1950)
Wilhelm Reinartz	Mar. 17, 1910	SS-Unterscharf.	Infirmary	2 years imprisonment
Wilhelm Petrak	Feb. 14, 1909	SS-Sturmmann	Camp guard	8 years (died Jul. 28, 1948 of disease after 2 years)

== Third Majdanek trial (1975–1981) ==
At the Third Majdanek Trial, held between November 26, 1975, and June 30, 1981, before a West German Court at Düsseldorf, sixteen defendants were arraigned. Five were cleared of all charges, two released due to ill health, one died of old age, and eight were found guilty. They were sentenced to 3 to 12 years imprisonment. The third Majdanek trial was preceded by the Treblinka Trials also at Düsseldorf in 1964 and 1970. The Majdanek trial lasted for six years, and concluded on June 30, 1981. There were insufficient grounds to lay charges against other suspects according to the prosecution (many of the key witnesses having died).

Notably, the camp deputy commandant, Arnold Strippel, implicated in the torture and killing of many dozens of prisoners (including 42 Soviet POWs in July 1942), received a nominal 3 1/2-year sentence. He also received 121,500-Deutsche Mark reimbursement for the loss of earnings and his social security contributions, which he used to purchase a condominium in Frankfurt, which he occupied until his death.

Defendant	Born	Rank	Function	Sentence
Alice Orlowski	Sept. 30, 1903	SS Aufseherin	Camp overseer	died of old age during the trial
Hermine Braunsteiner	Jul. 16, 1919	Rapportführerin	Female camp deputy	life imprisonment
Hildegard Lachert	Mar. 19, 1920	Aufseherin	Camp overseer	12 years imprisonment
Hermann Hackmann	Nov. 11, 1913	SS-Hauptst.	Camp commandant	10 years imprisonment
Emil Laurich	May 21, 1921	SS-Rottenf.	Ideology	8 years imprisonment
Heinz Villain	Feb. 1, 1921	SS-Unterscharf.	Field commandant	6 years imprisonment
Fritz-Heinrich Petrick	Jan. 22, 1913	SS-Oberscharf.	Camp guard	4 years imprisonment
Arnold Strippel	Jun. 2, 1911	SS-Obersturm.	Camp director	3.5 years imprisonment
Thomas Ellwanger	Mar. 3, 1917	SS-Unterscharf.	Camp guard	3 years imprisonment
Wilhelm Reinartz	Mar. 17, 1910	SS-Unterscharf.	Infirmary (selections)	released due to illness
Joanna (Johanna) Zelle		SS-Gefolge	Camp guard	released due to illness
Heinrich Schmidt	Mar. 27, 1912	SS-Hauptsturmf.	Medic (selections)	acquitted and released
Charlotte Mayer	Feb. 7, 1918		Maintenance	acquitted and released
Rosy Suess or (Rosa) Süss	Sept. 16, 1920		Maintenance	acquitted and released
Heinrich Groffmann		SS-Rottenf.	Field commandant	acquitted and released
Hermine Boettcher-Brueckner	Apr. 26, 1918		Maintenance	acquitted and released

== 1988 Höcker trial ==
In 1988, Karl-Friedrich Höcker was called to trial for ordering the Zyklon B used in Majdanek's gas chambers. He was sentenced to four years in prison in May 1989.

== See also ==
- Auschwitz trial held in Kraków, Poland in 1947. Tried 40 SS staff of the Auschwitz concentration camp
- Belsen trial
- Belzec trial before the 1st Munich District Court in the mid-1960s, of eight SS-men of the Belzec extermination camp
- Chełmno trials of the Chełmno extermination camp personnel, held in Poland and in Germany. The cases were decided almost twenty years apart
- Dachau trials held within the walls of the former Dachau concentration camp, 1945–1948
- Erich Muhsfeldt stationed at Majdanek-executed 1948 for crimes at Auschwitz
- Mauthausen-Gusen camp trials
- Nuremberg Trials of the 23 most important leaders of the Third Reich, 1945–1946
- Ravensbrück trial
- Sobibor trial held in Hagen, Germany in 1965, concerning the Sobibor extermination camp personnel
- Treblinka trials in Düsseldorf, Germany

== Notes and references ==
Media related to KZ Majdanek at Wikimedia Commons Media related to Majdanek concentration camp at Wikimedia Commons
