= Hermine Boettcher-Brueckner =

German concentration camp guard (born 1918)

- Born: 26 April 1918; Friedland
- Occupation: SS auxiliary guard

Hermine Boettcher-Brueckner (born 26 April 1918) was a Nazi SS auxiliary guard at several concentration camps between 1942 and 1945. In 1948 she was convicted for war crimes for her role in the Holocaust, and sentenced to imprisonment; she was tried again in 1975 but acquitted on lack of evidence. Her fate after the trial remains unknown.

== Atrocities in Nazi concentration camps ==
Böttcher was born in Friedland, in the Sudetenland (today Frýdlant, Czechia) on 26 April 1918 as an ethnic German.

On October 16, 1942 she was conscripted into camp service and indoctrinated at the Ravensbrück concentration camp. On January 27, 1943, Böttcher arrived at the Majdanek extermination and concentration camp in Lublin as an Aufseherin. There she married an SS man and became Hermine Bruckner.

In April 1944, she was moved to Auschwitz-Birkenau and in the summer of 1944 to the Kauen concentration camp, followed by a stint at the Stutthof concentration camp in July 1944. During August 1944 Böttcher was once again assigned to Ravensbrück, and then to Sachsenhausen, and finally in the Neu Rohlau satellite camp of Flossenbürg in January 1945. At the closing of the war, April–May 1945, she participated in a death march from Neu Rohlau.

== Trials, imprisonment and fate ==
Captured by the Czechs after the war, Böttcher was found guilty of vicious war crimes and sentenced to a term of imprisonment by a Czech court during 1948. In November 1975, Bottcher was once again placed on trial during the Third Majdanek Trial but was acquitted due to lack of evidence. Her fate remains unknown after the trial proceedings.
