= Hermann Hackmann =

German war criminal

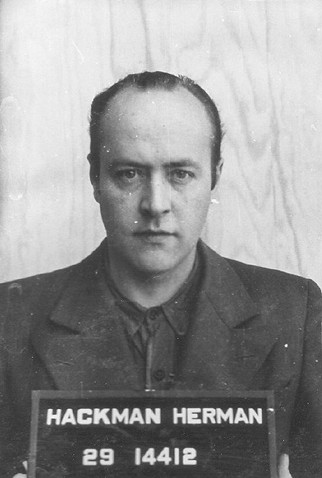
- Hackmann in U.S. custody (1947)
- Born: November 11, 1913; Osnabrück, German Empire
- Died: August 20, 1994 (aged 80); Uslar, Germany
- Military career
- Allegiance: Germany
- Rank: SS-Hauptsturmführer

Hermann Wilhelm Hackmann (November 11, 1913 – August 20, 1994) was a German war criminal who worked as a Nazi SS captain in two extermination camps during World War II. He was a roll call officer at KL Buchenwald, and lead guard in charge of the so-called protective custody at Majdanek concentration camp in German-occupied Poland. Described as a brutal man with a cynical sense of humour, Hackmann was tried three times. The first time, he was prosecuted for murder and embezzlement and sentenced to death by SS Judge Georg Konrad Morgen in connection with the Koch trial. However, Hackmann's sentence was later commuted to a prison term. He spent at least five months as a regular prisoner in Dachau concentration camp before being transferred to a penal battalion.

== Trials ==
Hackmann came from Osnabrück. At the age of 24 he first assumed the post of SS officer at Buchenwald. After the war, Hackmann was prosecuted this time by the U.S. government at the Buchenwald Trial of 1947. He was one of twenty-two Nazis sentenced to death for his role in the crimes against humanity committed at Buchenwald, though the sentence was commuted to life imprisonment in 1948. Details of his activities in Buchenwald that surfaced during the trial portray him as a man who was greatly feared by the prisoners and prone to violence and using different ways to torture prisoners. Inmates were frequently beaten, kicked and whipped by Hackmann with sticks and whips. He was also known to make prisoners kneel so he could kick them in the scrotum. There was a rule against spitting on the camp road and when Hackmann saw some spit on the ground he forced the nearest inmate to lick it up. One witness testified that he had two block leaders bend a birch tree where he made a Jewish man hold onto it. When the block leaders released the tree, the man was flung into the air into a stone quarry.

In 1950, Hackmann's sentence was further reduced to 25 years. He was paroled in 1955.

During the Third Majdanek trial between 1975 and 1981, he was sentenced to an additional ten years imprisonment for two counts of serving as joint accessory to murder of at least 141 prisoners at KL Lublin / Majdanek concentration camp.
