= Anton Thernes =

Nazi German war criminal (1892–1944)

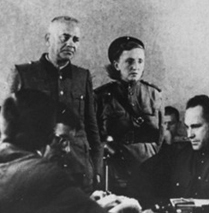
- Former SS-Obersturmführer Anton Thernes in front of a penal court on trial for crimes he committed at Majdanek (standing left), 1944
- Born: 8 February 1892; German Empire
- Died: 3 December 1944 (aged 52); Majdanek, Lublin, Republic of Poland
- Status: Executed by hanging
- Conviction: War crimes
- Trial: Majdanek trials
- Penalty: Death
- Military career
- Allegiance: Nazi Germany
- Branch: Schutzstaffel
- Service years: until 1944
- Rank: Obersturmführer
- Unit: SS-Totenkopfverbände

Anton Thernes (8 February 1892 – 3 December 1944) was a Nazi German war criminal, deputy commandant of administration at the notorious Majdanek concentration camp on the outskirts of Lublin, Poland, in World War II. He was tried at the Majdanek Trials and executed on 3 December 1944, along with five other war criminals, near the gas chambers and the Majdanek crematorium.

== War crimes ==
Thernes was married and had six children in Trier before the Nazi German invasion of Poland. A member of the SS, Thernes served as the last administrative chief of KL Lublin / Majdanek. He was also in charge of food and slave labour administration, starvation rationing, and the maintenance of camp structures including the storage depot for property and valuables stolen from the Holocaust victims at the killing centers in Belzec, Sobibor, and Treblinka.

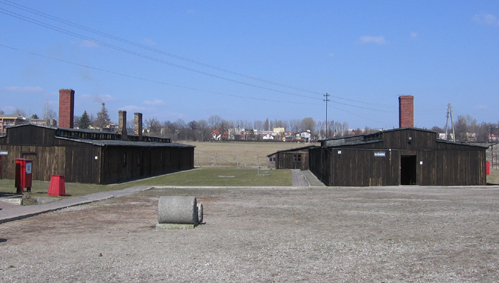
Showers (left) and gas chambers (right) at Majdanek

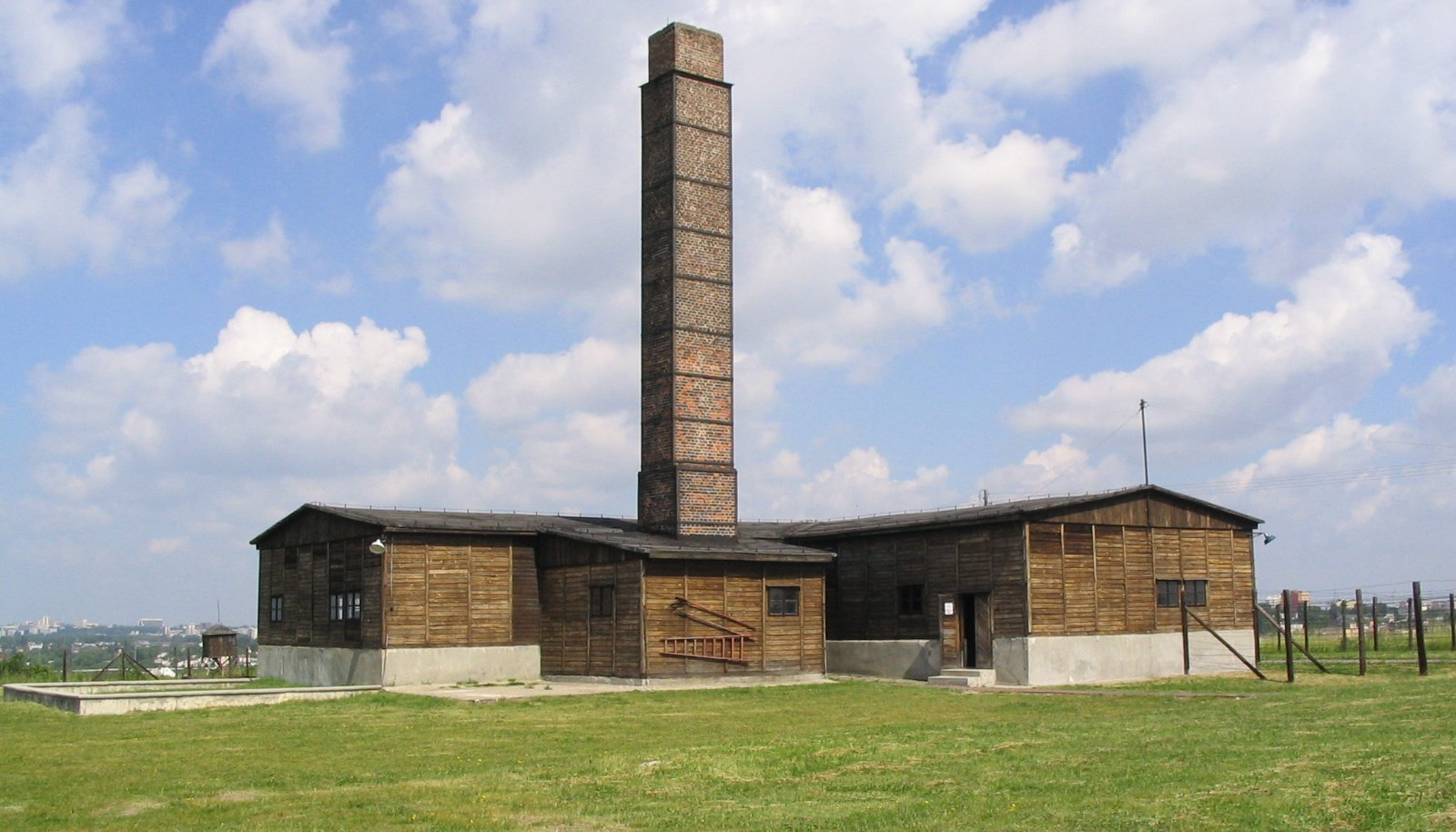
The camp's original crematorium with reconstructed wooden building around it, Majdanek c. 2006

Thernes was given the task of destroying the evidence of crimes against humanity and genocide, but ran out of time due to his ineptitude and lethargy. He was unable to destroy the chimneys and set the camp on fire before Soviet forces arrived at the camp outskirts. Thernes was caught by the Soviets and tried at the Majdanek Trials together with his assistant SS-Hauptsturmführer Wilhelm Gerstenmeier. He denied knowing anything, but the proceedings were swamped with testimonial proofs offered by eyewitnesses. During his trial, Thernes said, "The people here were mostly Jews, they were not real prisoners of war. I am not a sadist!"

Thernes was publicly hanged on 3 December 1944 along with five other war criminals, close to the gas chambers and the Majdanek crematorium.

== Harvest Festival ==
During the mere 34 months of camp operation, more than 79,000 people were murdered at the main camp alone (59,000 of them Polish Jews). Some 18,000 Jews were killed at Majdanek on 3 November 1943 during the largest single-day, single-camp massacre of the Holocaust, named Harvest Festival (totalling 43,000 with subcamps).
