= Majdanek concentration camp =

Nazi concentration camp in Poland (1941–1944)

Coordinates: 51°13′14″N 22°35′58″E

Majdanek / Lublin
- Nazi concentration camp
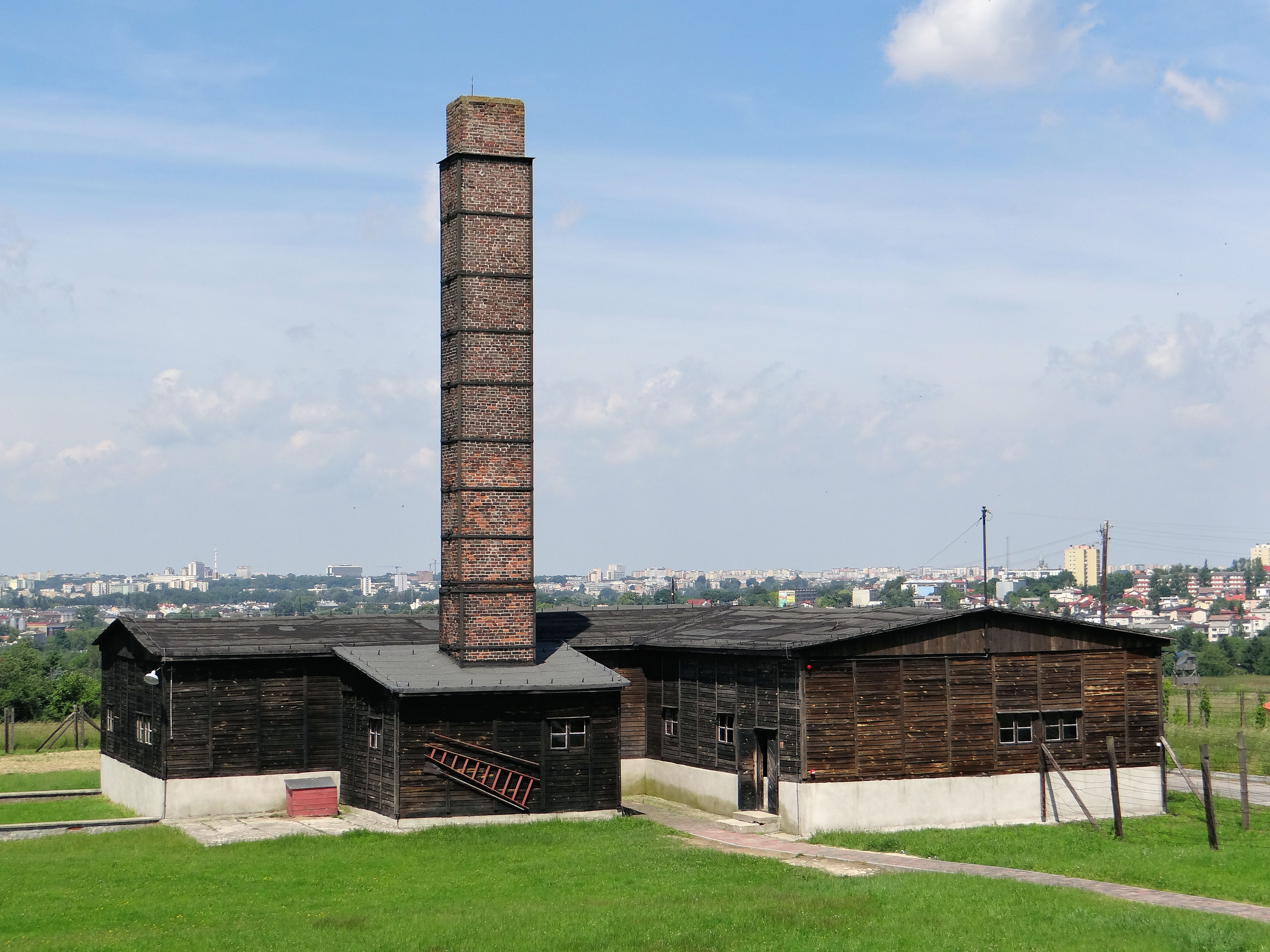
- Building of the New Crematorium
- Location: Near Lublin, General Government (German-occupied Poland)
- Operated by: SS-Totenkopfverbände
- Commandant: Karl-Otto Koch (Sep. 1941–Aug. 1942); Max Koegel (Aug. 1942–Nov. 1942); Hermann Florstedt (Nov. 1942–Oct. 1943); Martin Gottfried Weiss (Nov. 1943–May 1944); Arthur Liebehenschel (May 1944–July 1944)
- Original use: Forced labor
- Operational: October 1, 1941 – July 22, 1944
- Inmates: Jews, Poles
- Number of inmates: 150,000
- Killed: Estimated 78,000
- Liberated by: Soviet Union, July 22, 1944

Majdanek (or Lublin) was a Nazi concentration and extermination camp built and operated by the SS on the outskirts of the city of Lublin during the German occupation of Poland in World War II. It had three gas chambers, two wooden gallows, and some 227 structures in all, placing it among the largest of Nazi concentration camps. Although initially intended for forced labor rather than extermination, it was used to murder an estimated 78,000 people during Operation Reinhard, the German plan to murder all Polish Jews within their own occupied homeland. In operation from October 1, 1941, to July 22, 1944, it was captured nearly intact. The rapid advance of the Soviet Red Army during Operation Bagration prevented the SS from destroying most of its infrastructure, and Deputy Camp Commandant Anton Thernes failed to remove the most incriminating evidence of war crimes.

The camp was nicknamed Majdanek ("little Majdan") in 1941 by local residents, as it was adjacent to the Lublin Ghetto of Majdan Tatarski. Nazi documents initially described the site as a POW camp of the Waffen-SS, based on how it was funded and operated. It was renamed by the Reich Security Main Office as Konzentrationslager Lublin on April 9, 1943, but the local Polish name remained more popular.

After the camp's liberation in July 1944, the site was formally protected by the Soviet Union. By autumn, with the war still raging, it had been preserved as a museum. The crematorium ovens and gas chambers were largely intact, serving as some of the best examples of the genocidal policy of Nazi Germany. The site was given national designation in 1965. Today, the Majdanek State Museum is a Holocaust memorial museum and education centre devoted entirely to the memory of atrocities committed in the network of concentration, slave-labor, and extermination camps and sub-camps of KL Lublin. It houses a permanent collection of rare artifacts, archival photographs, and testimony.

== History ==
=== Construction ===
Location of Majdanek on the map of Lublin ~ 4 kilometres (2.5 mi)

Konzentrationslager Lublin was established in October 1941 on the orders of Reichsführer-SS Heinrich Himmler, forwarded to Odilo Globocnik soon after Himmler's visit to Lublin on July 17–20, 1941 in the course of Operation Barbarossa, the German invasion of the Soviet Union. The original plan drafted by Himmler was for the camp to hold at least 25,000 POWs.

After large numbers of Soviet prisoners-of-war were captured during the Battle of Kiev, the projected camp capacity was subsequently increased to 50,000. Construction for that many began on October 1, 1941 (as it did also in Auschwitz-Birkenau, which had received the same order). In early November, the plans were extended to allow for 125,000 inmates and in December to 150,000. It was further increased in March 1942 to allow for 250,000 Soviet prisoners of war.

Construction began with 150 Jewish forced laborers from one of Globocnik's Lublin camps, to which the prisoners returned each night. Later the workforce included 2,000 Red Army POWs, who had to survive extreme conditions, including sleeping out in the open. By mid-November, only 500 of them were still alive, of whom at least 30% were incapable of further labor. In mid-December, barracks for 20,000 were ready when a typhus epidemic broke out, and by January 1942 all the slave laborers – POWs as well as Polish Jews – were dead. All work ceased until March 1942, when new prisoners arrived. Although the camp did eventually have the capacity to hold approximately 50,000 prisoners, it did not grow significantly beyond that size.

=== Operation ===
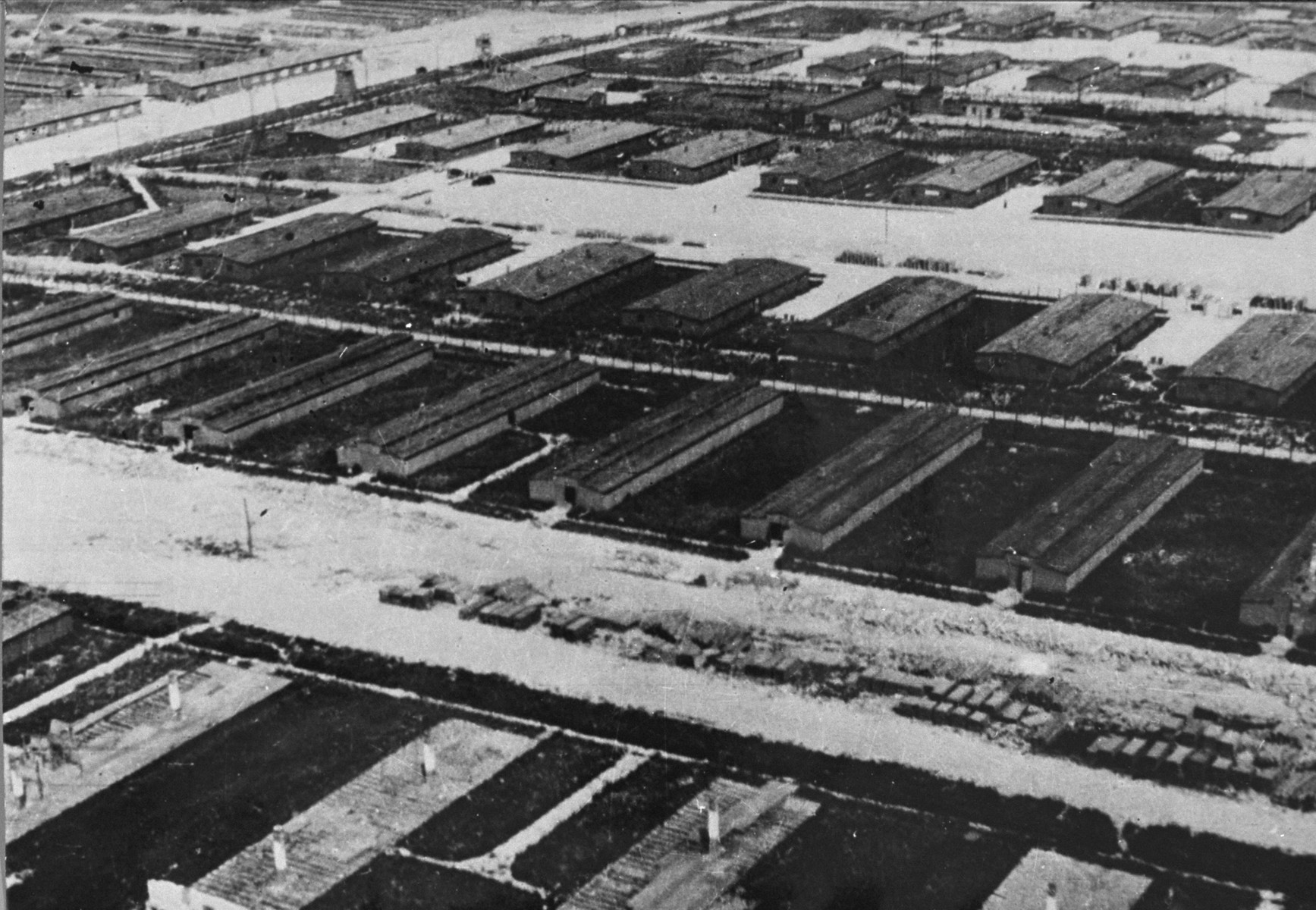
Aerial photograph of Majdanek (June 24, 1944). From bottom: the barracks under deconstruction with visible chimney stacks still standing, planks of wood piled up along the supply road, intact barracks.

In July 1942, Himmler visited Belzec, Sobibor, and Treblinka, the three secret extermination camps built specifically for Operation Reinhard to eliminate Polish Jewry. These camps had begun operations in March, May, and July 1942, respectively. Subsequently, Himmler issued an order that the deportations of Jews to the camps from the five districts of occupied Poland, which constituted the Nazi Generalgouvernement, be completed by the end of 1942.

Majdanek was made into a secondary sorting and storage depot at the onset of Operation Reinhard, for property and valuables taken from the victims at the killing centers in Belzec, Sobibor, and Treblinka. Due to large Jewish populations in southeastern Poland, including the ghettos at Kraków, Lwów, Zamość and Warsaw, which were not yet "processed", Majdanek was refurbished as a killing center around March 1942. The gassing was performed in plain view of other inmates, without as much as a fence around the buildings. Another frequent murder method was shootings by the squads of Trawnikis. According to the Majdanek Museum, the gas chambers began operation in September 1942.

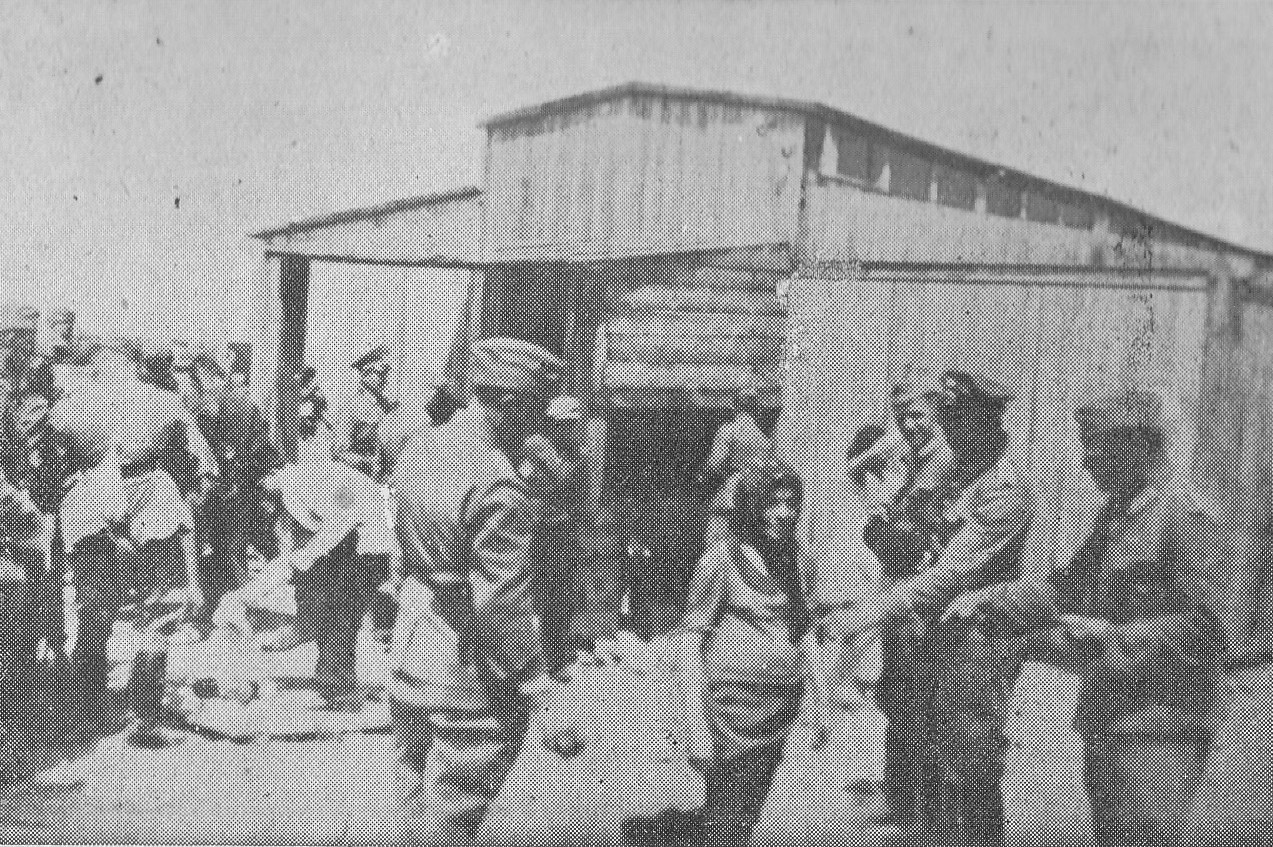
Arrival of new inmates.

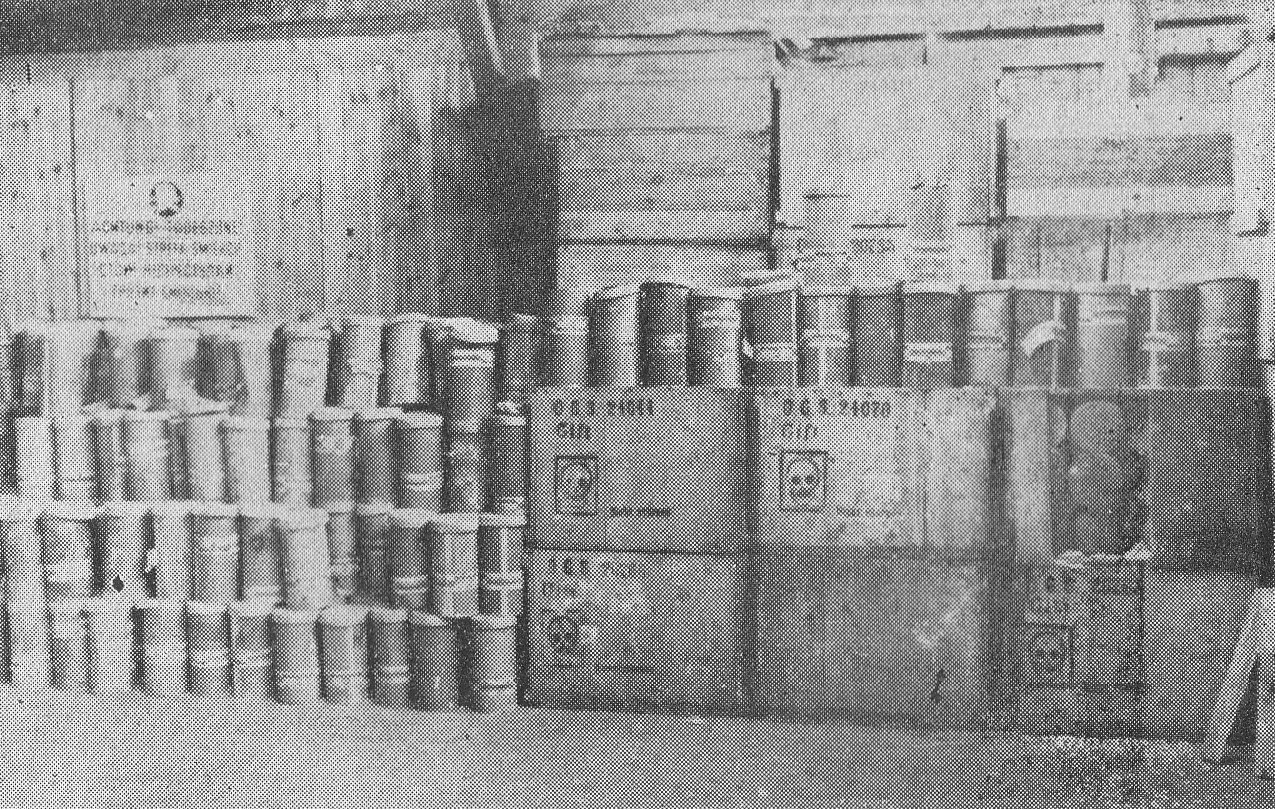
Zyklon B stored in the camp.

There are two identical buildings at Majdanek where Zyklon B was used. Executions were carried out in barrack 41 with crystalline hydrogen cyanide released by the Zyklon B. The same poison gas pellets were used to disinfect prisoner clothing in barrack 42.

Due to the pressing need for foreign manpower in the war industry, Jewish laborers from Poland were originally spared. For a time they were either kept in the ghettos, such as the one in Warsaw (which became a concentration camp after the Warsaw Ghetto Uprising), or sent to labor camps such as Majdanek, where they worked primarily at the Steyr-Daimler-Puch weapons/munitions factory.

By mid-October 1942, the camp held 9,519 registered prisoners, of whom 7,468 (or 78.45%) were Jews, and another 1,884 (19.79%) were non-Jewish Poles. By August 1943, there were 16,206 prisoners in the main camp, of which 9,105 (56.18%) were Jews and 3,893 (24.02%) were non-Jewish Poles. Minority contingents included Belarusians, Ukrainians, Russians, Germans, Austrians, Slovenes, Italians, and French and Dutch nationals. According to the data from the official Majdanek State Museum, 300,000 people were inmates of the camp at one time or another. The prisoner population at any given time was much lower.

From October 1942 onward Majdanek also had female overseers. These SS guards, trained at the Ravensbrück concentration camp, included Elsa Ehrich, Hermine Boettcher-Brueckner, Hermine Braunsteiner, Hildegard Lächert, Rosy Suess (Süss), Elisabeth Knoblich-Ernst, Charlotte Karla Mayer-Woellert, and Gertrud Heise (1942–1944), who were later convicted as war criminals.

Majdanek did not initially have subcamps. These were incorporated in early autumn 1943 when the remaining forced labor camps around Lublin, including Budzyn, Trawniki, Poniatowa, Krasnik, Pulawy, as well as the "Airstrip" ("Airfield"), and "Lipowa 7") concentration camps became sub-camps of Majdanek.

From September 1, 1941, to May 28, 1942, Alfons Bentele headed the Administration in the camp. Alois Kurz, SS Untersturmführer, was a German staff member at Majdanek, Auschwitz-Birkenau, and at Mittelbau-Dora. He was not charged. On June 18, 1943, Fritz Ritterbusch moved to KL Lublin to become aide-de-camp to the Commandant.

Due to the camp's proximity to Lublin, prisoners were able to communicate with the outside world through letters smuggled out by civilian workers who entered the camp. Many of these surviving letters have been donated by their recipients to the camp museum. In 2008 the museum held a special exhibition displaying a selection of those letters.

From February 1943 onward, the Germans allowed the Polish Red Cross and Central Welfare Council to bring in food items to the camp. Prisoners could receive food packages addressed to them by name via the Polish Red Cross. The Majdanek Museum archives document 10,300 such itemized deliveries.

=== Cremation facilities ===
Cremation facilities at Majdanek

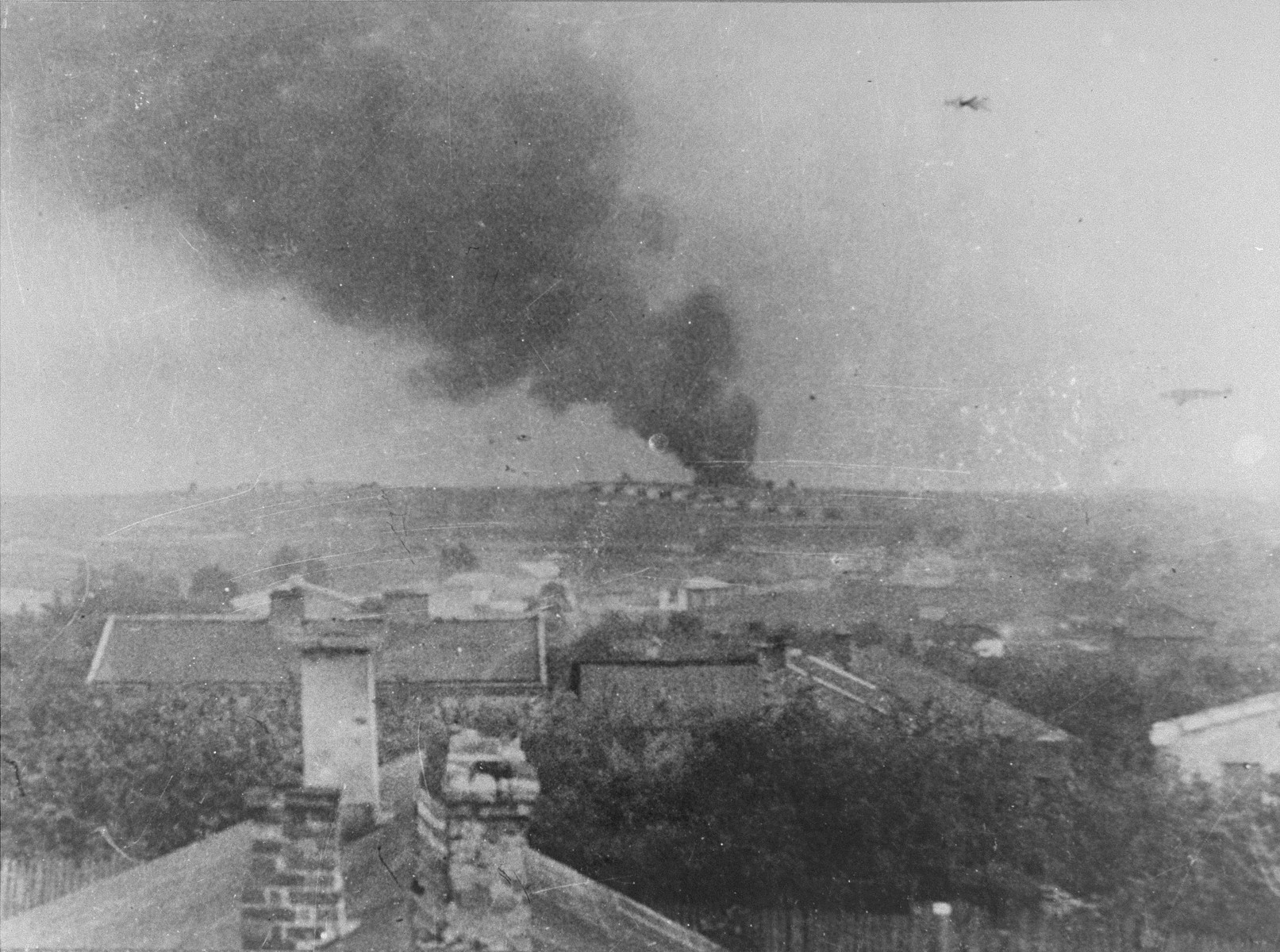
Smoke rising from Majdanek, October 1943

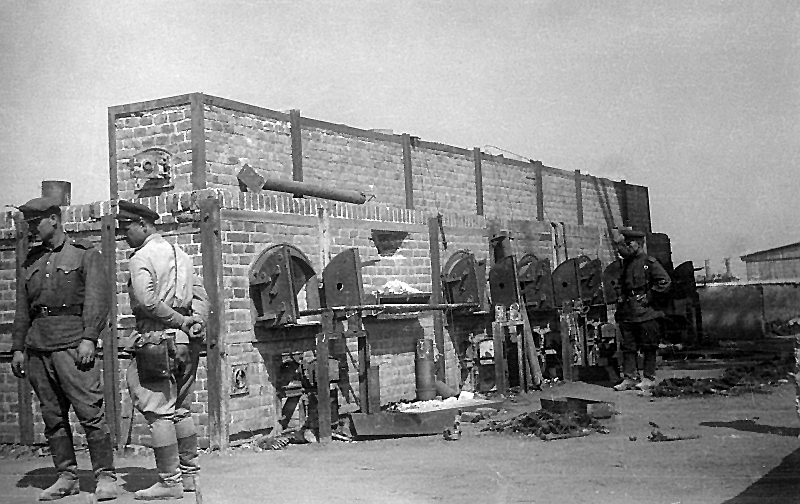
Red Army soldiers examining the ovens of the burned-down New Crematorium, following the camp's liberation, summer 1944

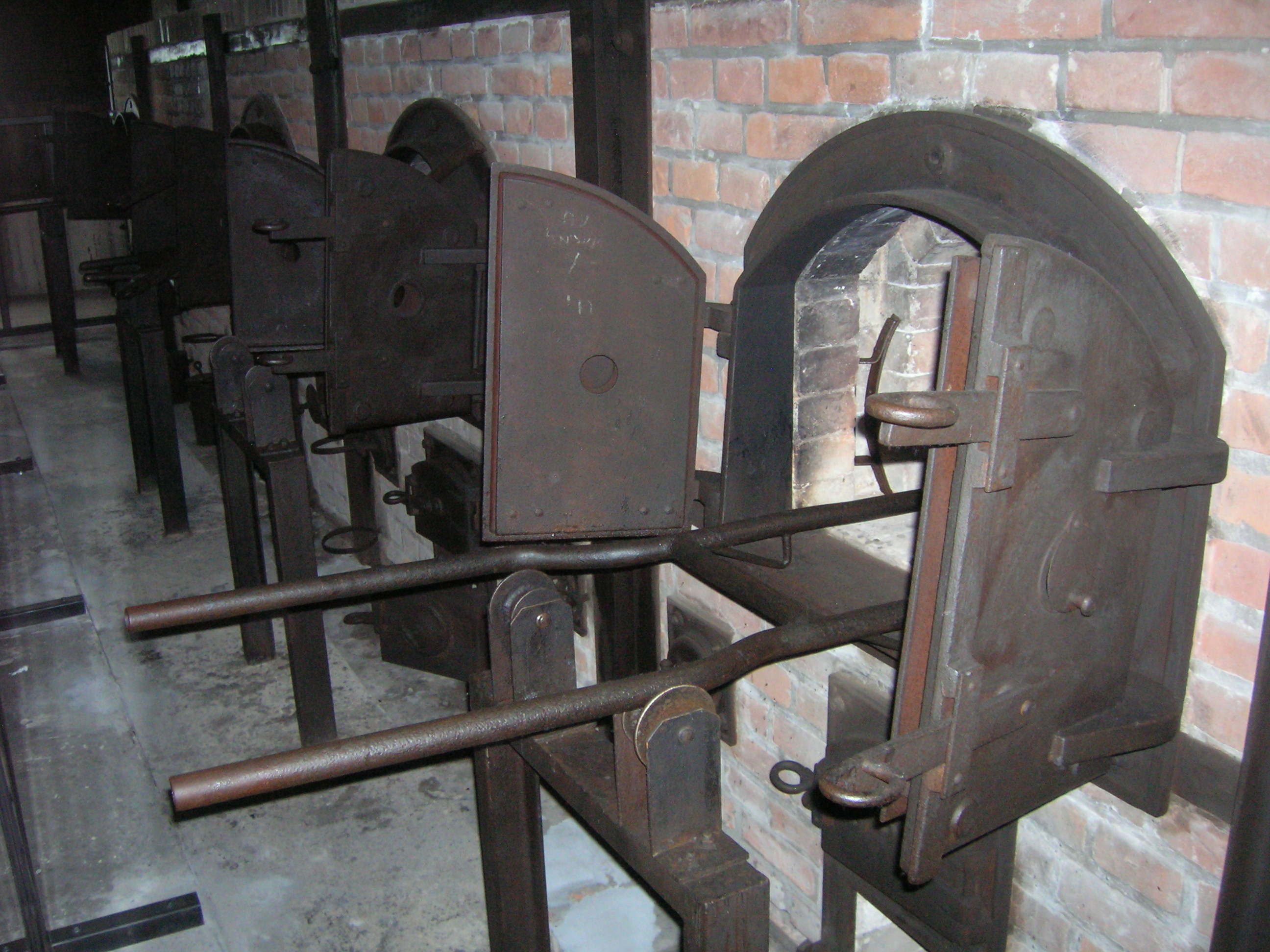
Preserved original ovens in the reconstructed building of the New Crematorium (closeup)

Until June 1942, the bodies of those murdered at Majdanek were buried in mass graves (these were later exhumed and burned by the prisoners assigned to Sonderkommando 1005).

From June 1942, the SS disposed of the bodies by burning them, either on pyres made from the chassis of old lorries or in a crematorium. The so-called First Crematorium had two ovens which were brought to Majdanek from the Sachsenhausen concentration camp. This facility stood in "Interfield I", the area between the first and the second fenced camp section; it is no longer in existence today.

In autumn of 1943, the first crematorium at Majdanek was replaced by the New Crematorium. It was a T-shaped wooden building with five ovens, fueled with coke and built by the Heinrich Kori GmbH of Berlin. The building was set on fire by the Germans on July 22, 1944, as they abandoned the camp on the day that the Red Army entered the outskirts of Lublin. The crematorium building which stands on the site today is a reconstruction from the time when the former camp became a memorial. Its ovens are the original ones built in 1943.

=== Aktion Erntefest ===
Operation Reinhard continued until early November 1943, when the last Jewish prisoners of the Majdanek system of subcamps from the District Lublin in the General Government were massacred by the firing squads of Trawniki men during Operation "Harvest Festival". With respect to the main camp at Majdanek, the most notorious executions occurred on November 3, 1943, when 18,400 Jews were murdered in a single day. The next morning, 25 Jews who had succeeded in hiding were found and shot. Meanwhile, 611 other prisoners, 311 women and 300 men, were commanded to sort through the clothes of the dead and cover the burial trenches. The men were later assigned to Sonderkommando 1005, where they had to exhume the same bodies for cremation. These men were then executed. The 311 women were subsequently sent to Auschwitz, where they were murdered by gas. By the end of Aktion Erntefest ("Harvest Festival"), Majdanek had only 71 Jews left out of the total number of 6,562 prisoners still alive.

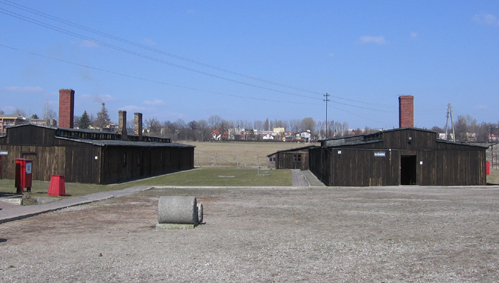
Inconspicuous structure for murder. Showers (left), and similarly built gas chambers (right).

Executions of the remaining prisoners continued at Majdanek in the following months. Between December 1943 and March 1944, Majdanek received approximately 18,000 so-called "invalids", many of whom were subsequently murdered with Zyklon B. Executions by firing squad continued as well, with 600 shot on January 21, 1944; 180 shot on January 23, 1944; and 200 shot on March 24, 1944.

Adjutant Karl Höcker's postwar trial documented his culpability in mass murders committed at this camp:

On 3 May 1989 a district court in the German city of Bielefeld sentenced Höcker to four years imprisonment for his involvement in gassing to death prisoners, primarily Polish Jews, in the concentration camp Majdanek in Poland. Camp records showed that between May 1943 and May 1944 Höcker had acquired at least 3,610 kilograms (7,960 lb) of Zyklon B poisonous gas for use in Majdanek from the Hamburg firm of Tesch & Stabenow.

In addition, Commandant Rudolf Höss of Auschwitz wrote in his memoirs, while awaiting trial in Poland, that one method of murder used at Majdanek (KZ Lublin) was Zyklon B.

=== Evacuation ===
In late July 1944, with Soviet forces rapidly approaching Lublin, the Germans hastily evacuated the camp and partially destroyed the crematoria before Soviet Red Army troops arrived on July 24, 1944. Majdanek is the best-preserved camp of the Holocaust due to incompetence by its deputy commander, Anton Thernes. It was the first major concentration camp liberated by Allied forces, and the horrors found there were widely publicised.

Although 1,000 inmates had previously been forcibly marched to Auschwitz (of whom only half arrived alive), the Red Army still found thousands of inmates, mainly POWs, still in the camp, and ample evidence of the mass murder that had occurred there.

== Victims ==
The official estimate of 78,000 victims, of those 59,000 Jews, was determined in 2005 by Tomasz Kranz, director of the Research Department of the Majdanek State Museum. In 1961, Raul Hilberg estimated 50,000 Jewish victims at Majdanek in The Destruction of the European Jews.

The total number of victims which were earlier displayed at the museum has been controversial. The museum once cited the 1948 estimate of Judge Zdzisław Łukaszkiewicz, who approximated a figure of 360,000 victims, and a 1992 estimate of approximately 235,000 victims by Czesław Rajca of the Majdanek Museum. However, Kranz found that both estimates relied upon incomplete records and camp documents. The revised estimate of 78,000 was described as "incredibly low" by Rajca, nevertheless, it has been accepted by the Museum Board of Directors "with a certain caution", pending further research into the number of prisoners who were not entered into the Holocaust train records by German camp administration. The museum states that some 150,000 prisoners arrived at Majdanek during the 34 months of its existence. Of the more than two million Jews murdered in the course of Operation Reinhard, some 60,000 (56,000 known by name) were most certainly killed at Majdanek, among its 78,000 estimated victims.

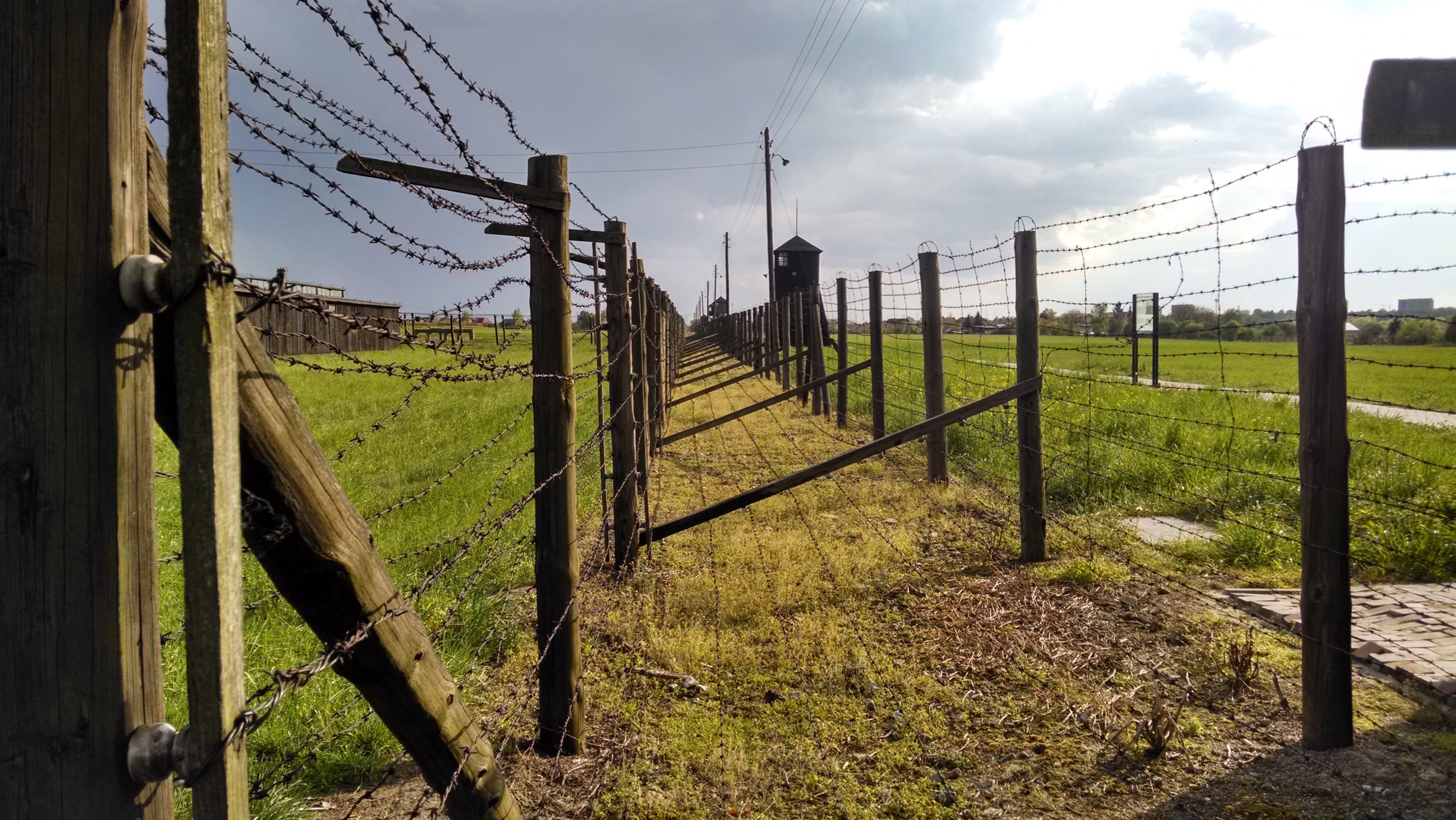
Guard towers along the barbed-wire double-fence on the Majdanek camp perimeter

The Soviets grossly overestimated the number of murders, claiming at the Nuremberg Trials in 1946 that there were no fewer than 400,000 Jewish victims, and the official Soviet count was of 1.5 million victims of different nationalities. Independent Canadian journalist Raymond Arthur Davies, based in Moscow and on the payroll of the Canadian Jewish Congress, visited Majdanek on August 28, 1944. The following day he sent a telegram to Saul Hayes, the executive director of the Canadian Jewish Congress. It states: "I do wish [to] stress that Majdanek where one million Jews and half a million others [were] killed" and "You can tell America that at least three million [Polish] Jews [were] killed of whom at least a third were killed in Majdanek", and though widely reported in this way, the estimate was never taken seriously by scholars.

In 1961, Raul Hilberg estimated that 50,000 Jewish victims were murdered in the camp. In 1992, Czesław Rajca gave his own estimate of 235,000; it was displayed at the camp museum. The 2005 research by the Head of Scientific Department at Majdanek Museum, historian Tomasz Kranz indicated that there were 79,000 victims, 59,000 of them Jews.

The differences between the estimates stem from different methods used and the amounts of evidence available to the researchers. The Soviet figures relied on the crudest methodology, used for Auschwitz estimates also—it assumed that the number of victims more or less corresponded to the crematoria capacity. Later researchers tried to take much more evidence into account, using records of deportations, contemporaneous population censuses, and recovered Nazi records. Hilberg's 1961 estimate, using these records, aligns closely with Kranz's report.

Majdanek commandants
Name	Rank	Service and Notes
Karl-Otto Koch	SS-Standartenführer	Camp commandant from October 1941 to August 1942. Tried and executed by the SS on April 5, 1945, for robbing the Reich of Jewish gold and money and committing multiple unauthorized murders.
Max Koegel	SS-Sturmbannführer	Camp commandant from August 1942 to November 1942. Committed suicide in Allied detention in Germany the day after his arrest on June 27, 1946.
Hermann Florstedt	SS-Obersturmführer	Camp commandant from November 1942 to October 1943. Tried and sentenced to death by the SS on April 15, 1945, for stealing from the Reich to become rich, the same as Koch. Whether he was executed is unknown.
Martin Gottfried Weiss	SS-Obersturmbannführer	Camp commandant from November 1, 1943, to May 5, 1944. Tried by the U.S. military during the Dachau trials in November 1945, hanged on May 29, 1946.
Arthur Liebehenschel	SS-Obersturmbannführer	Camp commandant from May 5, 1944, to July 22, 1944. Tried by Poland at the Auschwitz trial in Kraków, sentenced to death and hanged on January 28, 1948.
The second in command, throughout, was SS-Obersturmführer Anton Thernes. Tried at the Majdanek trials in Lublin, found guilty of crimes against humanity, sentenced to death by hanging and executed on December 3, 1944.

== Aftermath ==
The Memorial

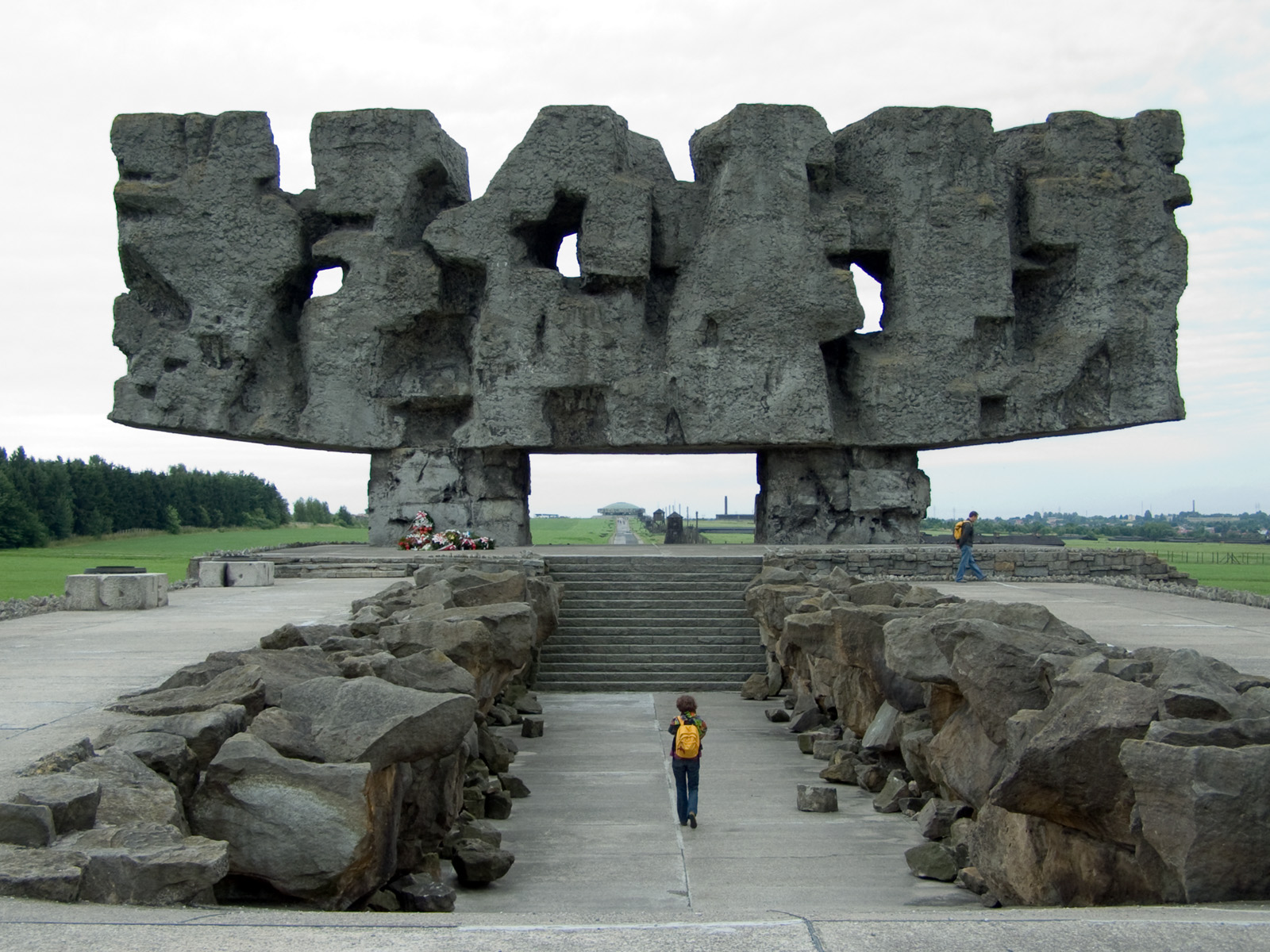
Memorial at the "entry gate" to the camp. The symbolic pylon is meant to represent mangled bodies.

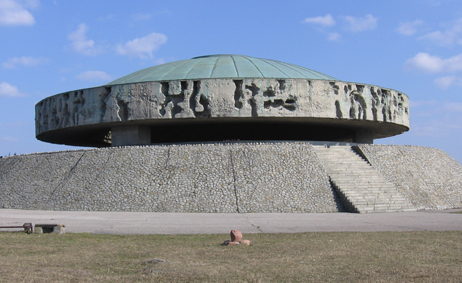
The Mausoleum erected in 1969 contains ashes and remains of cremated victims, collected into a mound after liberation of the camp in 1944.

After the camp takeover, in August 1944 the Soviets protected the camp area and convened a special Polish-Soviet commission to investigate and document the crimes against humanity committed at Majdanek. This effort constituted one of the first attempts to document the Nazi war crimes in Eastern Europe. In the fall of 1944 the Majdanek State Museum was founded on the grounds of the Majdanek concentration camp. In 1947 the actual camp became the monument of martyrology by the decree of Polish Parliament. In the same year, some 1,300 m^{3} of surface soil mixed with human ashes and fragments of bones was collected and turned into a large mound. Majdanek became a national museum in 1965.

Some Nazi personnel of the camp were prosecuted immediately after the war, some in the decades afterward. In November and December 1944, four SS Men and two kapos were placed on trial; one committed suicide and the rest were hanged on December 3, 1944. The last major, widely publicized prosecution of 16 SS members from Majdanek (Majdanek-Prozess in German) took place from 1975 to 1981 in West Germany. Of 1,037 SS members who worked at Majdanek and are known by name, 170 were prosecuted, due to a rule applied by the West German justice system allowing only those directly involved in the process to be charged with murder.

=== Soviet NKVD use ===
After the capture of the camp by the Soviet Army, the NKVD retained the ready-made facility as a prison for soldiers of the Armia Krajowa (AK, the Home Army resistance) loyal to the Polish Government-in-Exile and the Narodowe Siły Zbrojne (National Armed Forces) opposed to both German and Soviet occupation. The NKVD, like the SS before them, used the same facilities to imprison and torture Polish patriots.

On August 19, 1944, in a report to the Polish government-in-exile, the Lublin District of the Home Army (AK) wrote: "Mass arrests of the AK soldiers are being carried out by the NKVD all over the region. These arrests are tolerated by the Polish Committee of National Liberation, and AK soldiers are incarcerated in the Majdanek Camp. Losses of our nation and the Home Army are equal to the losses which we suffered during the German occupation. We are paying with our blood."

Among the prisoners at the Majdanek NKVD Camp were Volhynian members of the AK and soldiers of the AK units which had been moving toward Warsaw to join in the Warsaw Uprising. On August 23, 1944, some 250 inmates from Majdanek were transported to the rail station Lublin Tatary. There, all victims were placed in cattle cars and taken to camps in Siberia and other parts of the Soviet Union.

== Commemoration ==
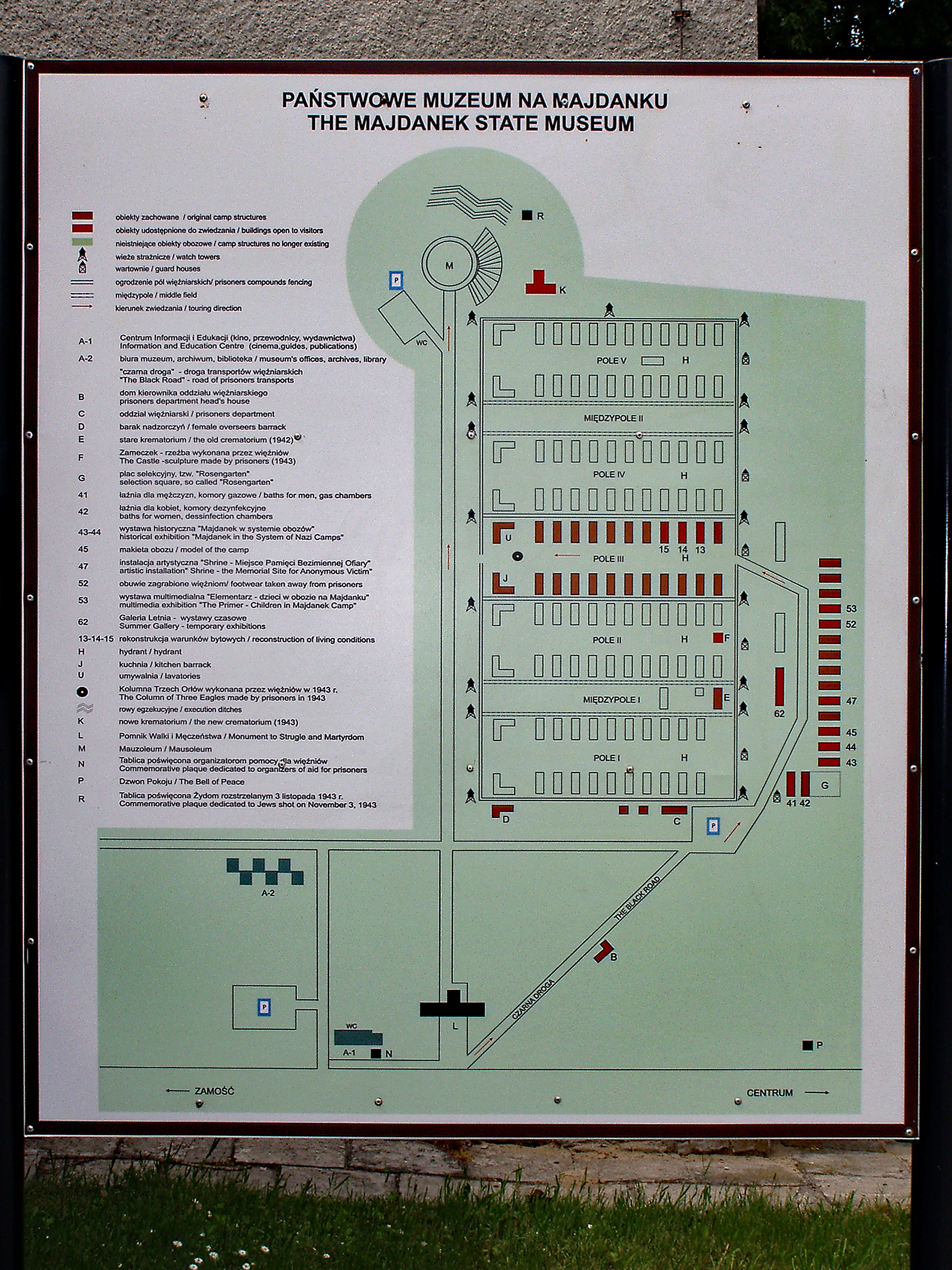
Map of the Majdanek State Museum site

In July 1969, on the 25th anniversary of its liberation, a large monument designed by Wiktor Tołkin (a.k.a. Victor Tolkin) was constructed at the site. It consists of two parts: a large gate monument at the camp's entrance and a large mausoleum holding ashes of the victims at its opposite end.

In October 2005, in cooperation with the Majdanek museum, four Majdanek survivors returned to the site and enabled archaeologists to find some 50 objects which had been buried by inmates, including watches, earrings, and wedding rings. According to the documentary film Buried Prayers, this was the largest reported recovery of valuables in a death camp to date. Interviews between government historians and Jewish survivors were not frequent before 2005.

The camp today occupies about half of its original 2.7 square kilometres (670 acres), and—but for the former buildings—is mostly bare. A fire in August 2010 destroyed one of the wooden buildings that was being used as a museum to house seven thousand pairs of prisoners' shoes. The city of Lublin has tripled in size since the end of World War II, and even the main camp is today within the boundaries of the city of Lublin. It is clearly visible to many inhabitants of the city's high-rises, a fact that many visitors remark upon. The gardens of houses and flats border on and overlook the camp.

In 2016, Majdanek State Museum and its branches, Sobibór and Bełżec, had about 210,000 visitors. This was an increase of 10,000 visitors from the previous year. Visitors include Jews, Poles, and others that wish to learn more about the crimes against humanity.

== Notable inmates ==
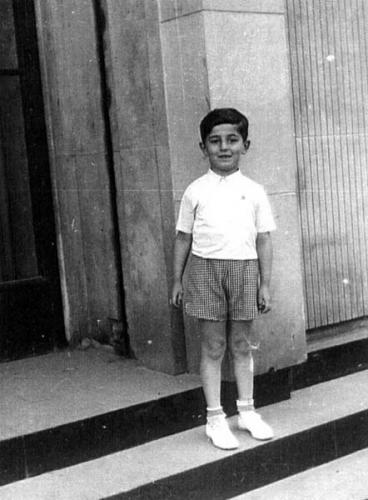
Henio Zytomirski, July 5, 1939

- Halina Birenbaum – writer, poet and translator
- Maria Albin Boniecki – artist
- Marian Filar – pianist
- Otto Freundlich – one of the artists included in the Nazis' 1937 "Degenerate Art" exhibition
- Mietek Grocher – Survived nine different camps. Author of Jag överlevde (eng. I Survived).
- Israel Gutman – historian
- Roman Kantor (1912–1943) – épée fencer, Nordic champion and Soviet champion; murdered by the Nazis
- Dmitry Karbyshev – Soviet general, Hero of the Soviet Union
- Omelyan Kovch – Ukrainian priest
- Dionys Lenard – escaped in 1942 warning the Slovak Jewish community
- Igor Newerly – writer
- Karl Plättner – revolutionary and author
- Helena Polaczkówna – Polish historian, war resistor
- Rudolf Vrba – transferred to Auschwitz, from which he escaped, and about which he co-authored the Vrba-Wetzler report, one of the first inside reports of the camp, and published during wartime
- Henio Zytomirski – child icon of the Holocaust in Poland
- Sonia Mosse – actress and model for Man Ray, subject of the famous photograph Nusch and Sonia
- Irena Iłłakowicz – Second Lieutenant of the NSZ (National Armed Forces) Polish resistance movement and an intelligence agent, escaped from the camp in 1943
- Yva – fashion photographer

== See also ==
- Kaiser Wilhelm Institute of Anthropology, Human Heredity, and Eugenics
- List of books about Nazi Germany
- List of Nazi concentration camps
- Research Materials: Max Planck Society Archive
