= Majdanek State Museum =

Holocaust museum in Lublin, Poland

- Państwowe Muzeum na Majdanku
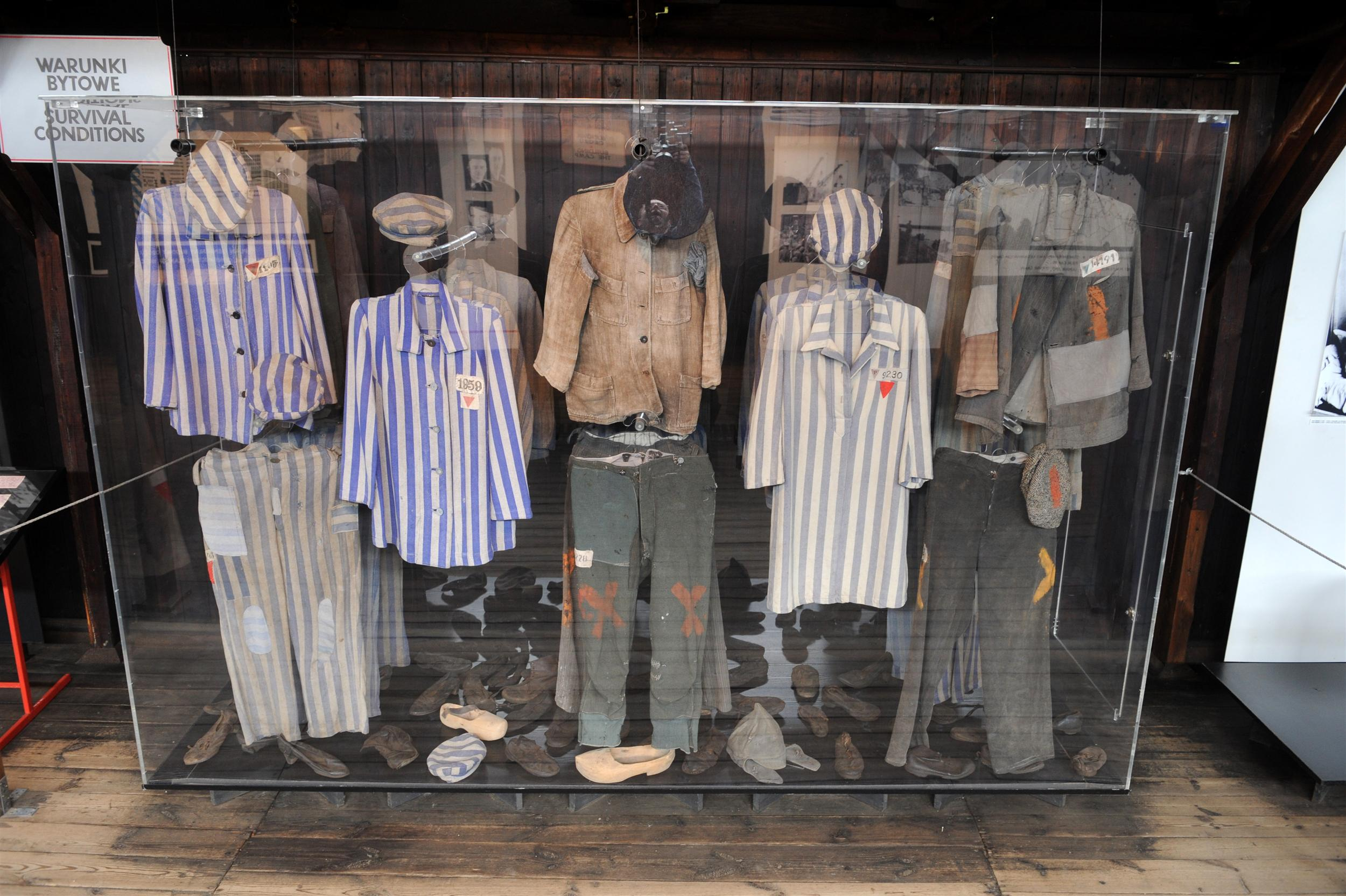
- One of the exhibits at the Majdanek Museum
- Established: 1944, confirmed by an act of the Polish parliament of 2 July 1947.
- Location: Majdanek, Poland
- Coordinates: 51.1318°N 22.35579°E
- Visitors: 121,404 (2011)
- Director: Tomasz Kranz
- Website: www.majdanek.eu

The Majdanek State Museum (Polish: Państwowe Muzeum na Majdanku) is a memorial museum and education centre founded in the fall of 1944 on the grounds of the Nazi Germany Majdanek death camp located in Lublin, Poland. It was the first museum of its kind in the world, devoted entirely to the memory of atrocities committed in the network of concentration, slave-labor, and extermination camps and subcamps of KL Lublin during World War II. The museum performs several tasks including scholarly research into the Holocaust in Poland. It houses a permanent collection of rare artifacts, archival photographs, and testimony.

== Site ==
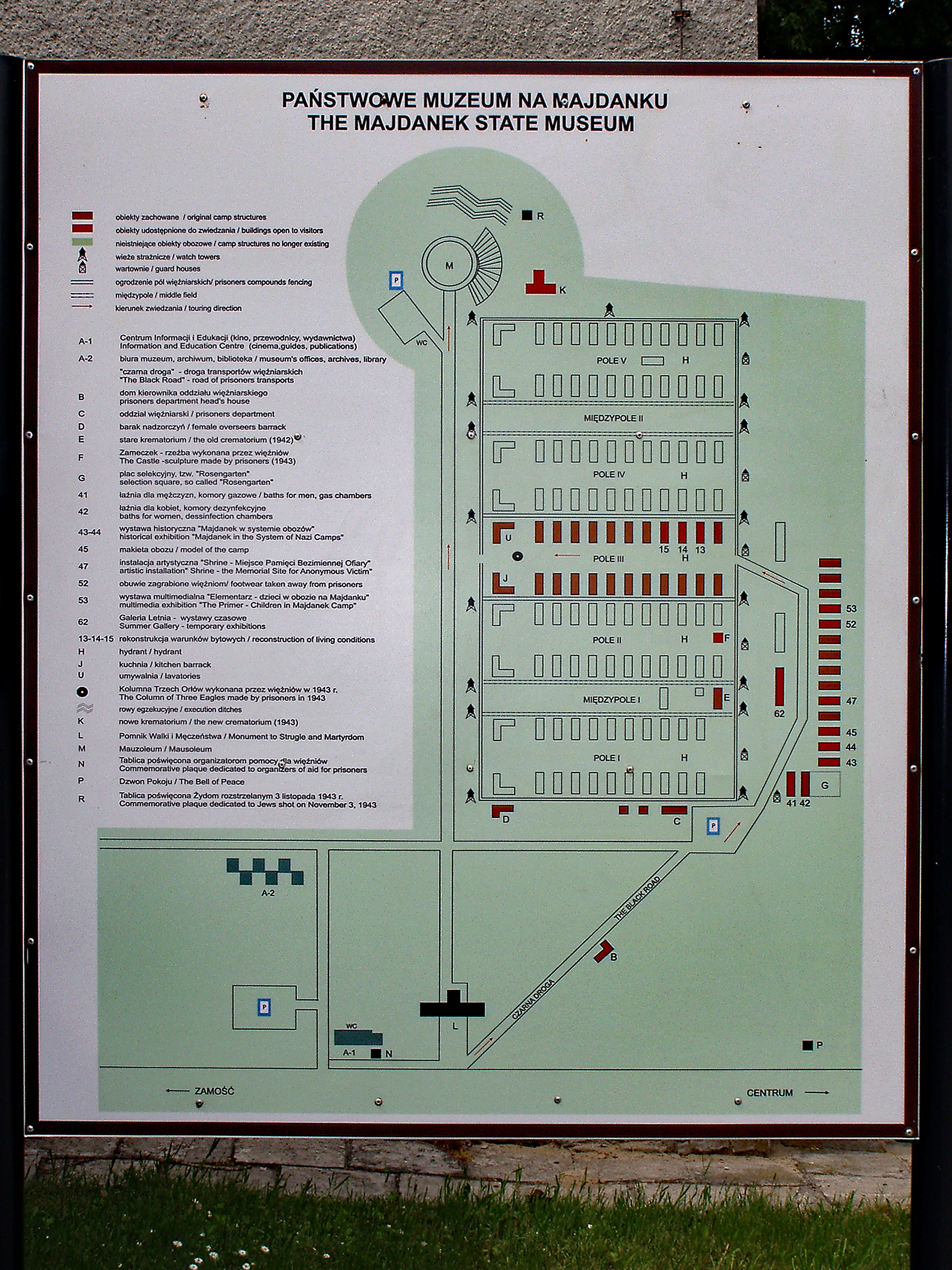
The Majdanek State Museum Info Centre display

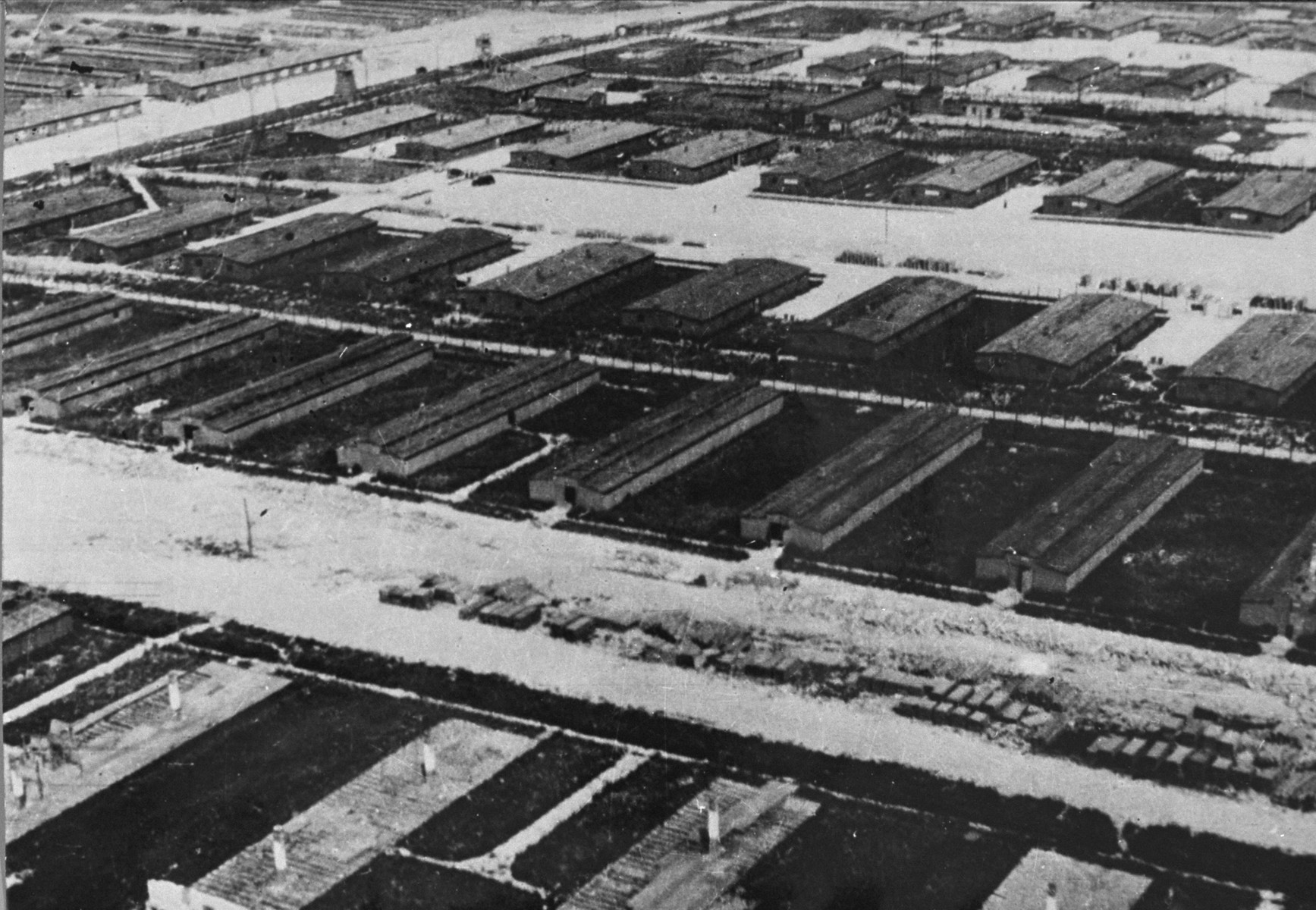
Majdanek concentration camp, 24 June 1944

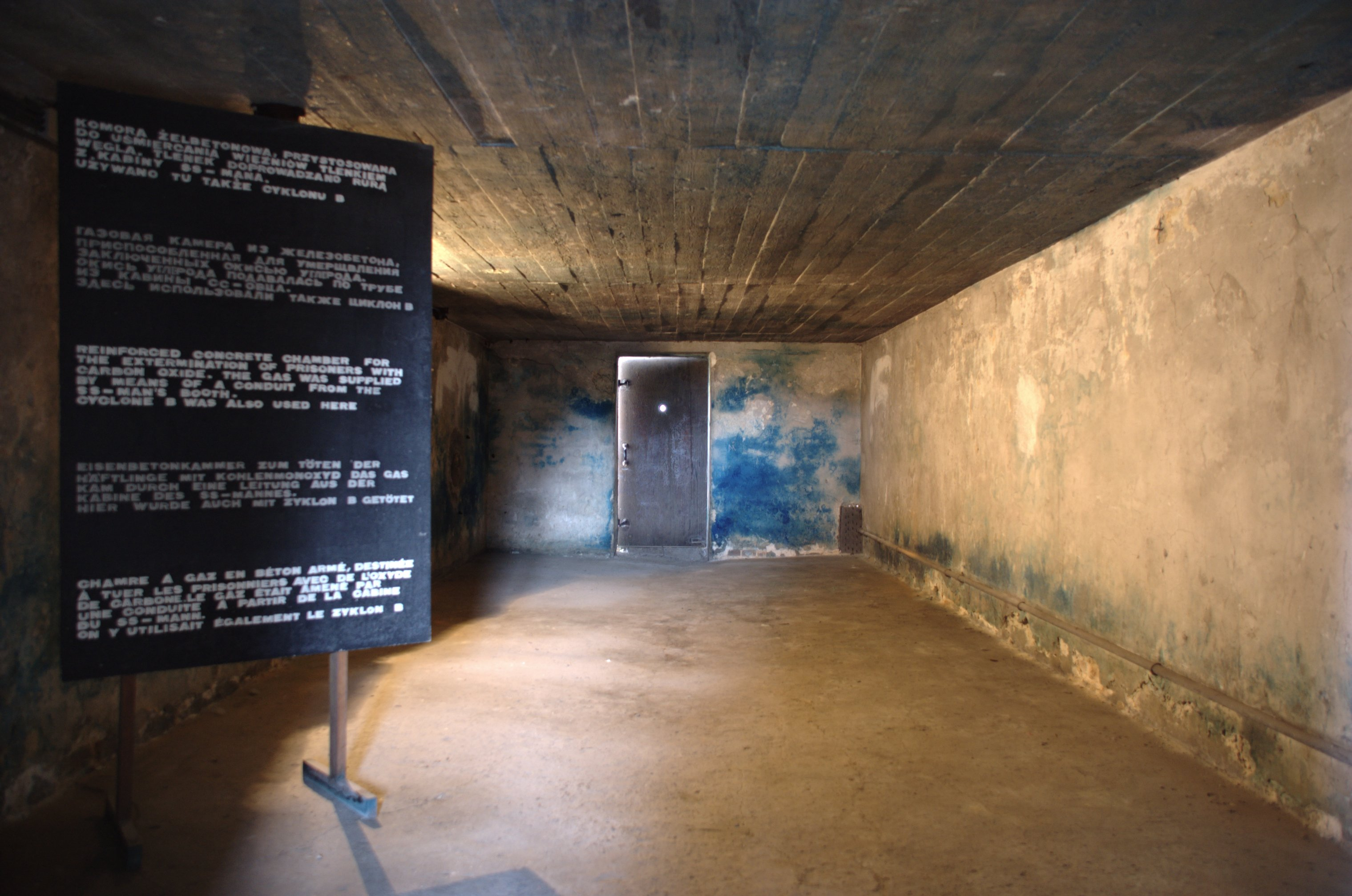
Original gas chamber with visible Zyklon B blue stain on the back wall, permanently burned into the cement next to the release duct

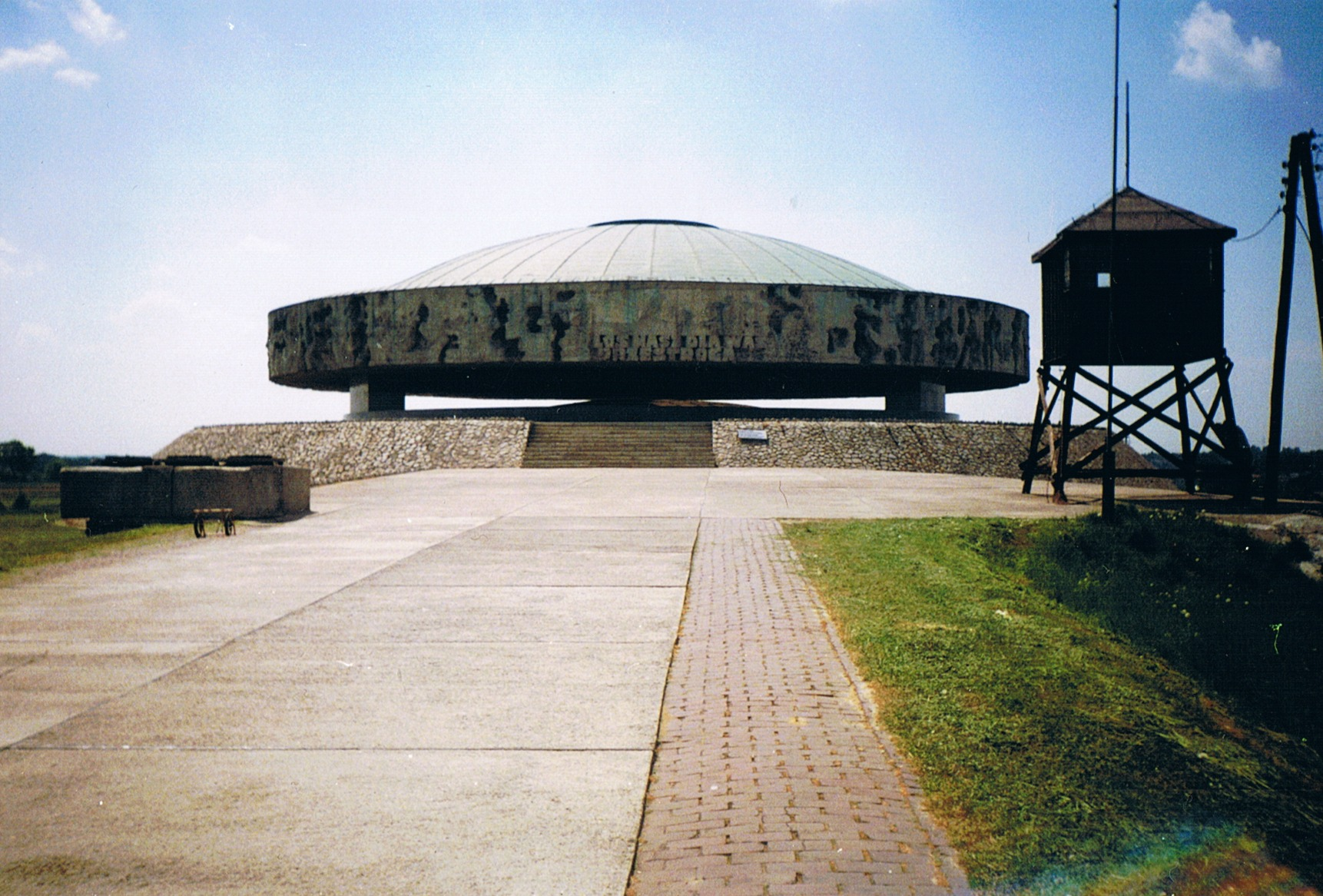
Overview of the Majdanek Memorial containing the mound of ashes of camp victims

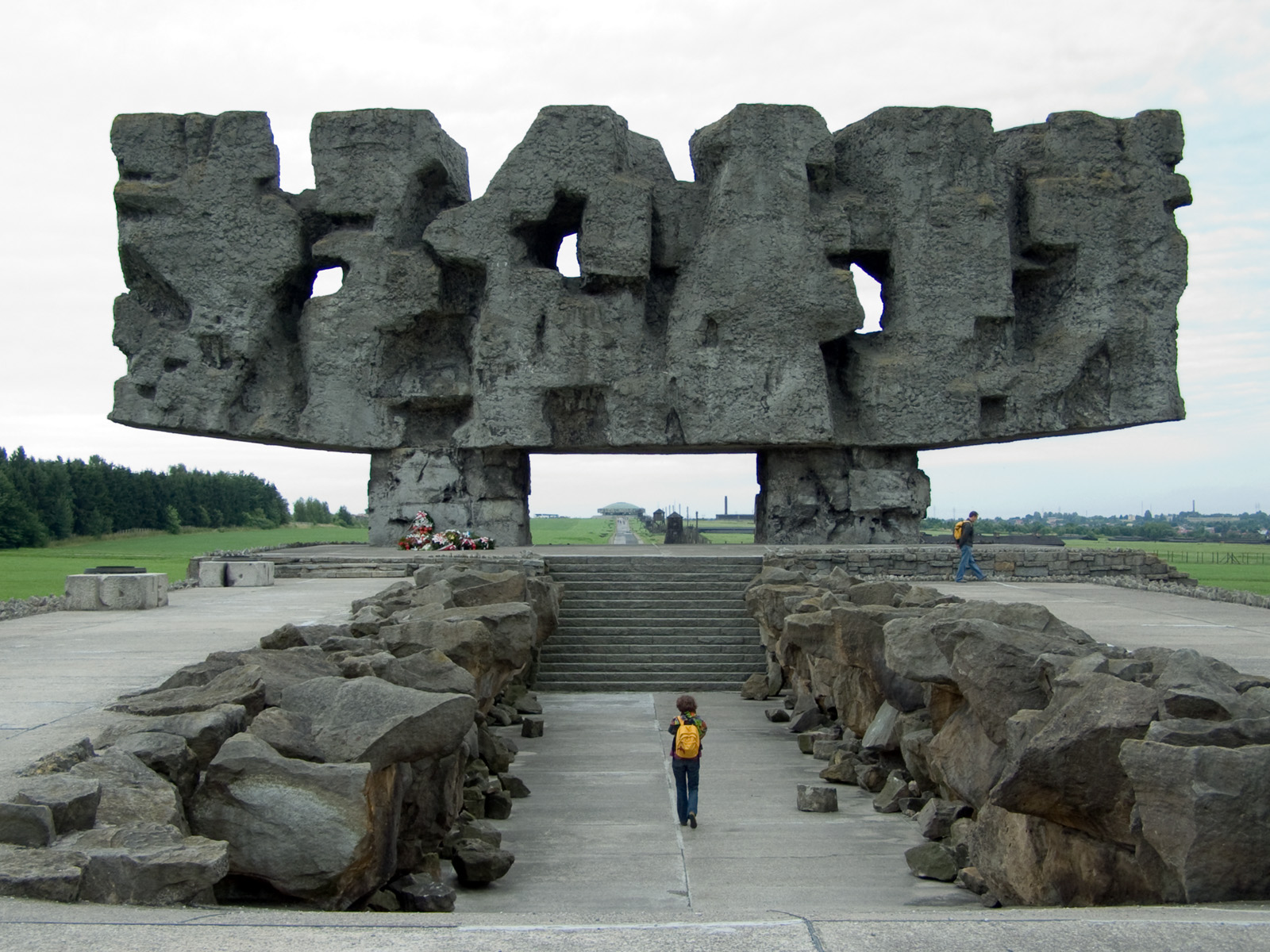
The symbolic Majdanek Pylon on the 64 anniversary of the camp liquidation. The relief, which resembles an abstracted Yiddish sign similar to Lublin (לובלין), is supposed to represent mangled bodies.

After the camp's liberation by the advancing Red Army on 23 July 1944, the site was formally protected. With the war still ongoing, it was preserved as a museum by the autumn of 1944. It remains one the best examples of a Nazi death camp, with largely intact gas chambers and crematoria. The camp became a state monument of martyrology by the 1947 decree of the Polish Parliament (Sejm). In the same year, some 1,300 m^{3} of surface soil mixed with human ashes and fragments of bones were collected and arranged into a large mound (since turned into a mausoleum). By comparison, the Auschwitz concentration camp liberated a half a year later, on 27 January 1945, was first declared a national monument in April 1946, but handed over to Poland by the Red Army only in 1947. The act of Polish Parliament of 2 July 1947, declared them both as state monuments of martyrology at the same time (Dz.U. 1947 nr 52 poz. 264/265). Majdanek received the status of Poland's national museum in 1965.

The retreating Germans did not have time to destroy the facility. During its 34 months of operation, more than 79,000 people were murdered at Majdanek main camp alone (59,000 of them Polish Jews) and between 95,000 and 130,000 people in the entire Majdanek system of subcamps. 18,400 Jews were killed at Majdanek on 3 November 1943, during the largest single-day, single-camp massacre of the Holocaust, named Harvest Festival (totalling 43,000 with two subcamps).

In 1969, on the 25th anniversary of the Majdanek liberation, a monument dedicated to Holocaust victims was erected on the grounds of the former Nazi extermination camp. It was designed by a Polish sculptor and architect Wiktor Tołkin, who also designed the symbolic tombstone at Stutthof. The monument consists of three parts, the symbolic Pylon (gate, 11 meters tall and 35 meters wide), the road, and the Mausoleum, containing a mound of ashes of the victims. The Museum is also in possession of the archives left behind by the SS after a failed attempt at their destruction by Obersturmführer Anton Thernes, tried at the Majdanek Trials.

== Recent history ==
In 2003, a new obelisk was erected at Majdanek to the memory of Jewish victims of Erntefest. In 2004, a new branch of Majdanek State Museum was inaugurated at the Belzec extermination camp nearby. Belzec was created for implementing the Operation Reinhard during the Holocaust. And finally, in 2005 additional archaeological works were conducted, resulting in new items being unearthed at the camp site, buried by Jewish prisoners in 1943.

On 2 September 2009 the Majdanek Museum was awarded the Gold Medal Gloria Artis for outstanding contributions to Polish culture by Deputy State Secretary Minister Tomasz Merta. Two other recipients included the Muzeum Stutthof and the Auschwitz-Birkenau State Museum. There was a massive fire at one of the barracks in Majdanek on the night of 9-10 August 2010. Some 7,000 pairs of prisoners' shoes were destroyed, according to the museum administration. The cause of the blaze is unknown. The museum states that bringing children under 13 to Majdanek is not advisable, because noisy behavior is forbidden. Since 1 May 2012 the Museum also serves as the main branch of the nearby Sobibór Museum.
