= Czarnieckiego Prison =

Czarnieckiego or Czarneckiego Prison may refer to:

- Kraków-Podgórze Detention Centre in Kraków; unit of the Ministry of Justice (Poland), historic prison during Nazi German occupation of Poland
- Czarnieckiego (or Czarneckiego) Prison in Łódź within Ghetto Litzmannstadt, historic site no longer in existence, mentioned in World War II literature
