= Mieczysław Zub =

Polish serial killer

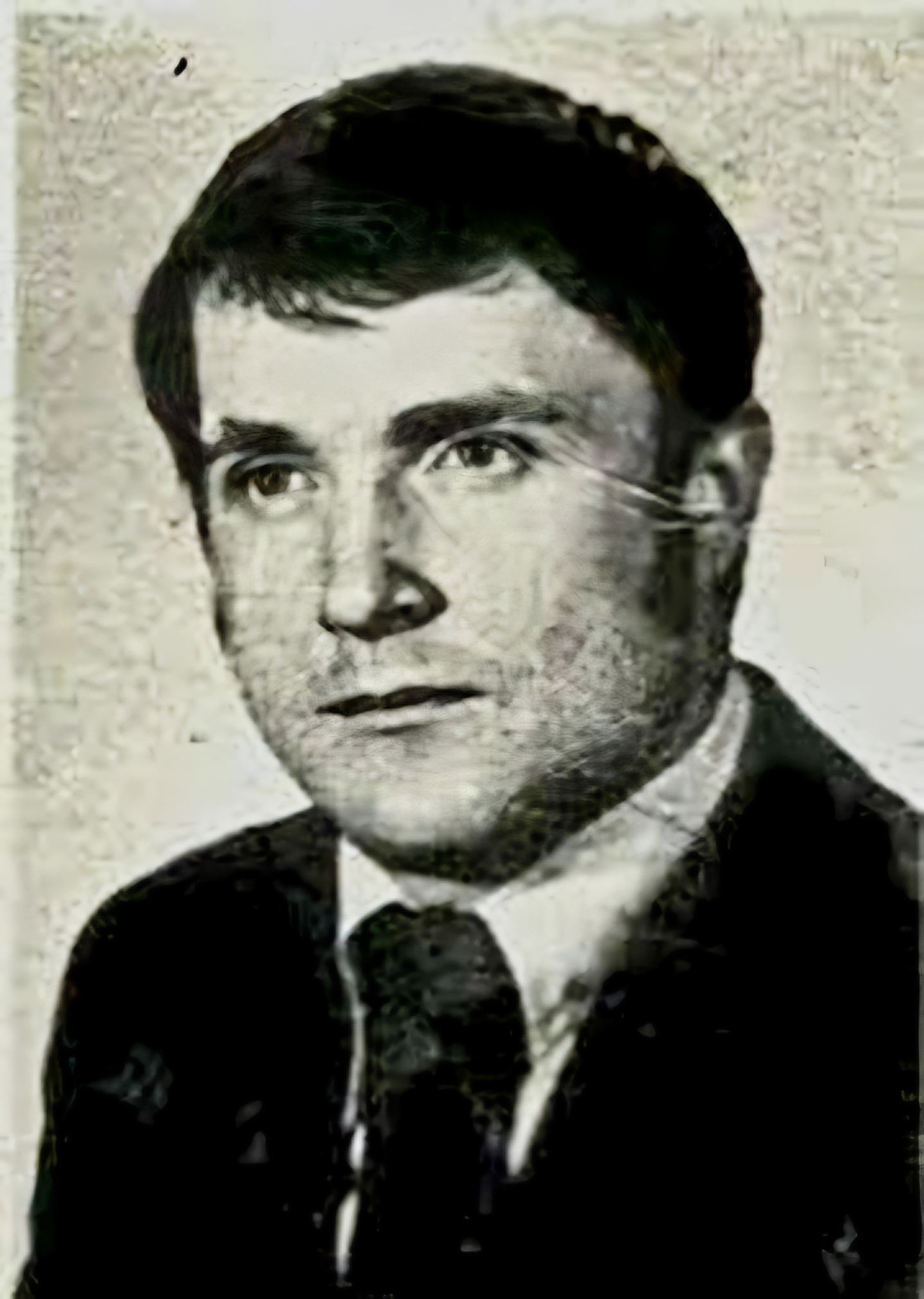
- Born: 10 October 1953; Krzeczyn Mały, Poland
- Died: 29 September 1985 (aged 31); Montelupich Prison, Kraków, Polish People's Republic
- Cause of death: Suicide
- Other name: Fantomas
- Status: Deceased
- Conviction: Murder (4 counts)
- Penalty: Death

Details
- Victims: 4
- Span of crimes: 1981–1983
- Country: Poland
- Date apprehended: March 1983

Mieczysław Zub (10 October 1953 – 29 September 1985) was a Polish serial killer who killed 4 women in Silesian Voivodeship. The Milicja Obywatelska gave him the pseudonym Fantomas.

== Murders ==
Mieczysław Zub committed 4 murders and 13 rapes at the turn of the 1970s and 1980s. At the beginning of his criminal activity, Zub was a policeman by profession; he would wear his uniform while committing his crimes, which made him feel unpunished. He made his first robbery on 29 November 1977 in Świętochłowice. He dragged a 14-year-old into the forest on the pretext of explaining a misunderstanding. There he turned her over, laid down next to her and covered her mouth with his hand. Threatening her with a gun, he ordered the girl to undress. The police opened an investigation into the matter, but it did not lead to anything.

In the 1970s, he made several more attacks on women while disguised as a policeman, but he was soon dismissed for disciplinary offences (which indicated doubts from his superiors towards Zub). After he was released, Zub did not commit any other crime for two years.

He returned to crime in September 1980 when he raped a young woman. A year later, he committed the first murder. On 19 November 1981, in Ruda Śląska, he raped and strangled a 19-year-old girl in her eighth month of pregnancy. Until the end of 1982, he murdered three more women. In March 1983, when he raped another victim he lost his pass, entitling him to enter the steelworks where he found a job. On 8 March 1983, Zub was detained and during the interrogation, he confessed to all crimes.

During the trial, Zub repeatedly insulted the judges, every now and then the trial had to be interrupted when the accused had to be removed. He was convicted and sentenced to death. While his verdict was being read, Zub destroyed the accused's bench by kicking it.

While in prison, Zub was aggressive towards his surroundings, forcing the prison authorities to put him in specially designed shackles and keep him in solitary confinement at the Montelupich Prison in Kraków. On 29 September 1985, Zub killed himself, a month after a previous suicide attempt.

Zub's many years of impunity according to some press reports can be explained by the fact that the militia focused on tracking down another serial killer at the time – Joachim Knychała.

== Zub's victims ==
Nmb.	Name	Age	Date of murder	Place of murder
1.	Jadwiga B.	19	19 November 1981	Ruda Śląska
2.	Elżbieta M.	25	3 March 1982	Katowice
3.	Katarzyna B.	16	18 November 1982	Ruda Śląska
4.	Elżbieta S.	23	6 January 1983	Sosnowiec

== See also ==
- List of serial killers by country
