= Montelupi Palace =

Coordinates: 50°4′13″N 19°56′32″E

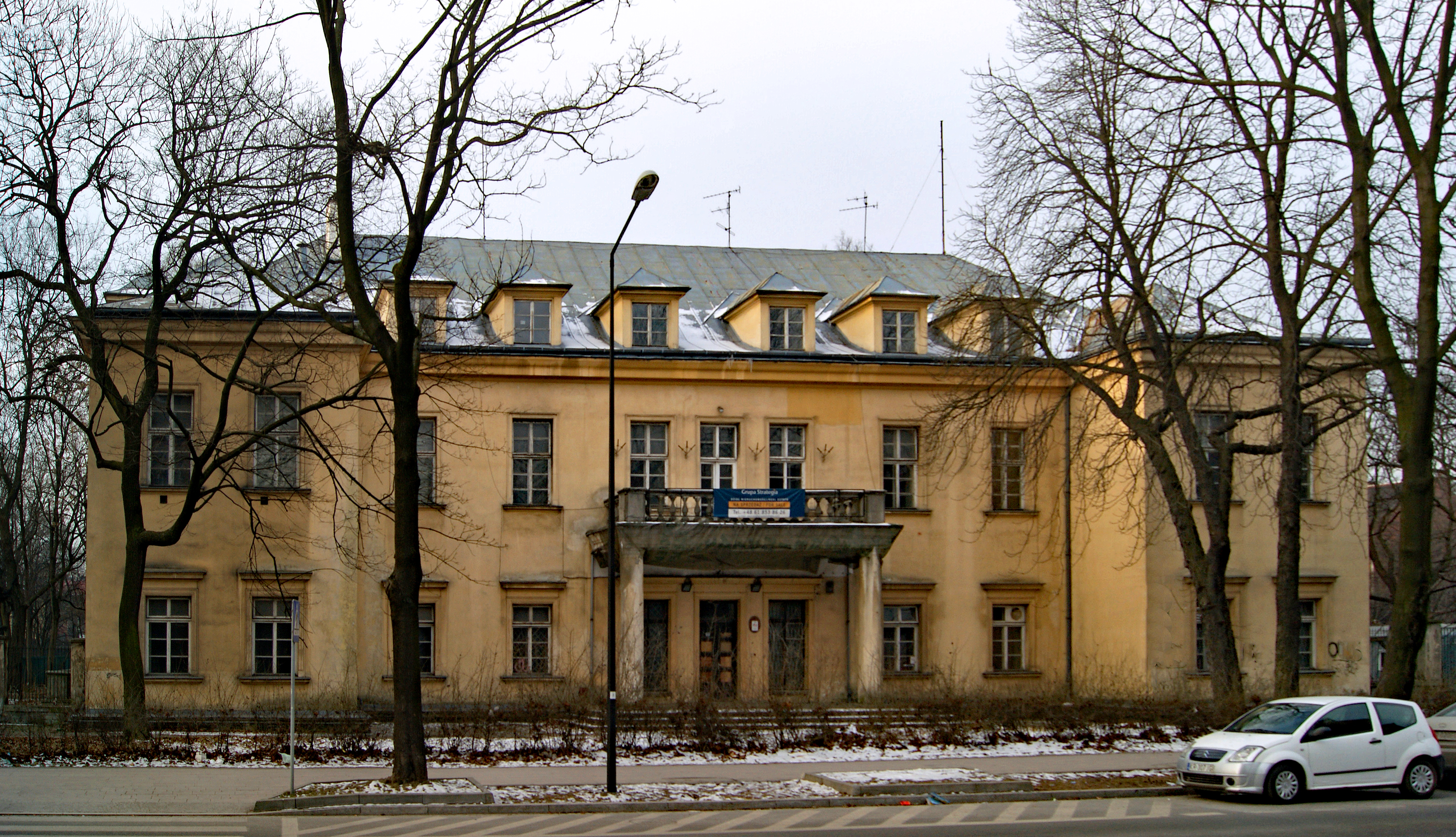
Montelupi Palace, also known as Palace on the Way, in Kraków

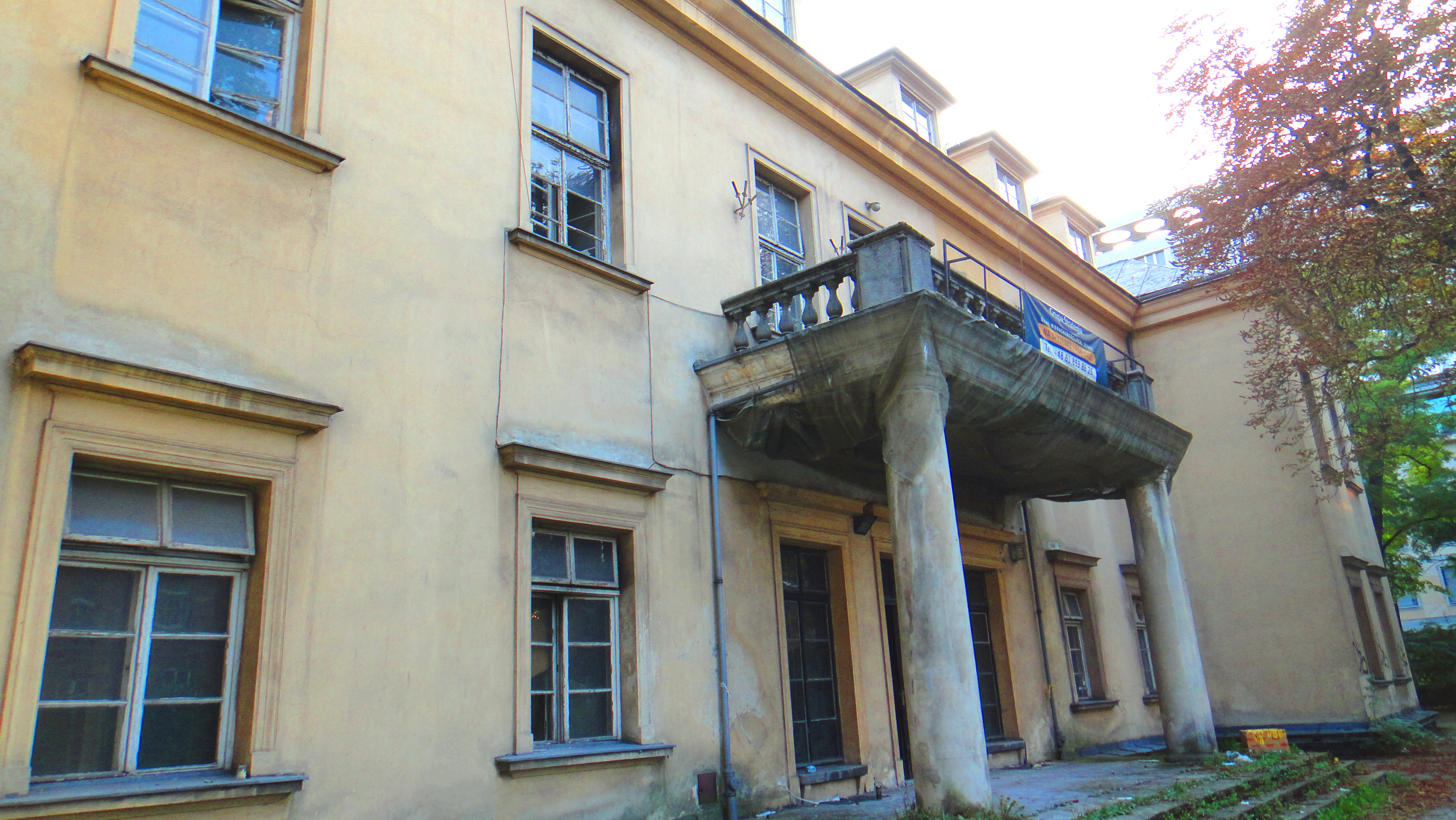
Montelupi Palace (Pałac Montelupich, also known as Pałac Tarnowskich); object of cultural heritage inscribed in the registry of the Lesser Poland Voivodeship with number A55 (Kraków)

Montelupi Palace, also known as the Tarnowski Palace or the Palace on the Way (Polish: Pałac na Szlaku or Pałac Montelupich) is a 17th-century palace in Kraków, Poland. It was built for the Montelupi family, descendants of an Italian-born merchant Sebastiano Montelupi, banker in the court of King Sigismund III Vasa. The palace was later owned by the noble Tarnowski family and others.

The palace is located at ul. Szlak 71 street (translated as on the Way) in the District of Stare Miasto close to the city centre. Even though the building is listed as monument since 1989 in the registry of the Lesser Poland Voivodeship, it has been neglected since 1998, while the Tarnowski family members continued their legal proceedings against the city for its private ownership.

== History highlights ==
The foundation document and the first mention of the Palace dates back to 1574. The original structure which later had been expanded with risalits and new stonework, used to have Polish kings and members of royal families among its frequent visitors. From in front of the Palace, royal funeral processions used to begin, hence its popular name at the time, royal mortuary. The funeral parade of King Sigismund III Vasa started there on February 4, 1633.

Around the sixteenth century, the Palace on the Way (or, on the Road) was one of the most prominent noble residences in the area of Kleparz within the jurisdiction of Szlak. Originally completed in 1613 for the Montelupi merchant family of the Italian background, the Palace was purchased by the Jesuit Order in 1639; than by the Badeni family in 1773; and the Tarnowskis, in the 19th century. It was refurbished and expanded in 1878 during the foreign partitions of Poland by renown local architect Antoni Łuszczkiewicz.

In the interwar Poland the building was transferred to the Salwatorian Fathers (Ojcowie Salwatorianie). During the Nazi German occupation of Poland its interiors were consumed by fire. Following World War II, the building was renovated by the state, and since 1950 held the offices of the Polish Radio, Poland's national publicly funded radio broadcasting organization. The Tarnowski family took over the property in 1998 following a court battle. In 2005 it was sold to Kraków Hostel owned by GD&K of Ireland. Further plans of redesigning the Palace were also rejected, and the foreign owner, formally obliged to maintain it, has become the subject of legal proceedings by the city in 2011 for neglecting it.
