= Gola Mire =

Gola Mire/Mira
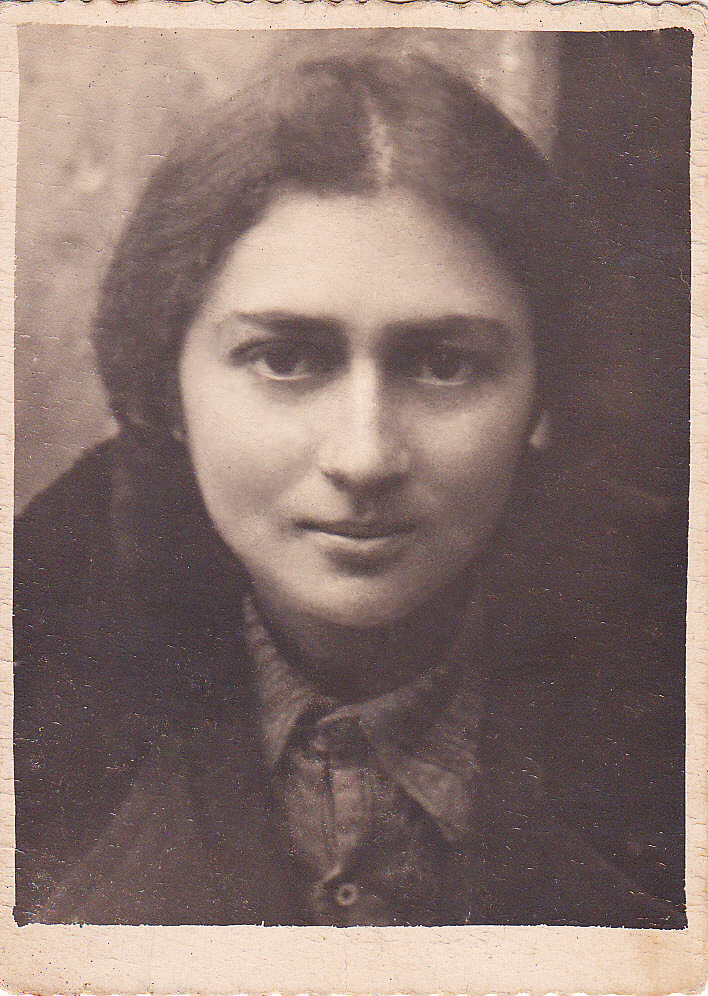
- Born: 1911
- Died: 1943 (aged 31–32); Montelupich Prison, Kraków, Poland

Gola Mire/Mira (1911–1943) was a member of the Jewish resistance underground in Poland during World War II.

Mire was active in the Zionist youth organization, Ha-Shomer ha-Za’ir, and joined the Communist Party in 1936. She organized labor strikes in Poland for which she was arrested.

After the German invasion of Poland, Mire joined the Polish Worker's Party (PPR) and collaborated with Jewish resistance groups including the Akiva and Dror Zionist youth organizations. She helped to plan and implement attacks against the Germans and was ultimately killed during a prison escape attempt.

== Early life and education ==
Mire was born to a Jewish family in Rzeszow, a town in the Galicia region of Poland. She attended Polish schools.

Mire became active in Ha-Shomer ha-Za’ir as a teenager and was elected to a leadership role in the organization requiring her to move to Lvov. She stayed behind in Poland when her parents moved to Belgium in 1932.

== Activism and resistance ==
=== Early activism and first imprisonment ===
Mire was expelled from Ha-Shomer ha-Za’ir in 1932 due to her vocal support of the Communist Soviet Union. She joined the Communist Party in 1936 and organized a strike at the Kontakt factory, her place of employment. She was arrested for her role in the strike and served six months in prison. Upon her release, she organized Communist cells and activities in Przemysl for which she was arrested again and sentenced to twelve years in Fordon Prison. The guards at the prison fled upon news of the 1939 German invasion of Poland and outbreak of World War II. Mire and her fellow prisoners escaped before the Germans arrived.

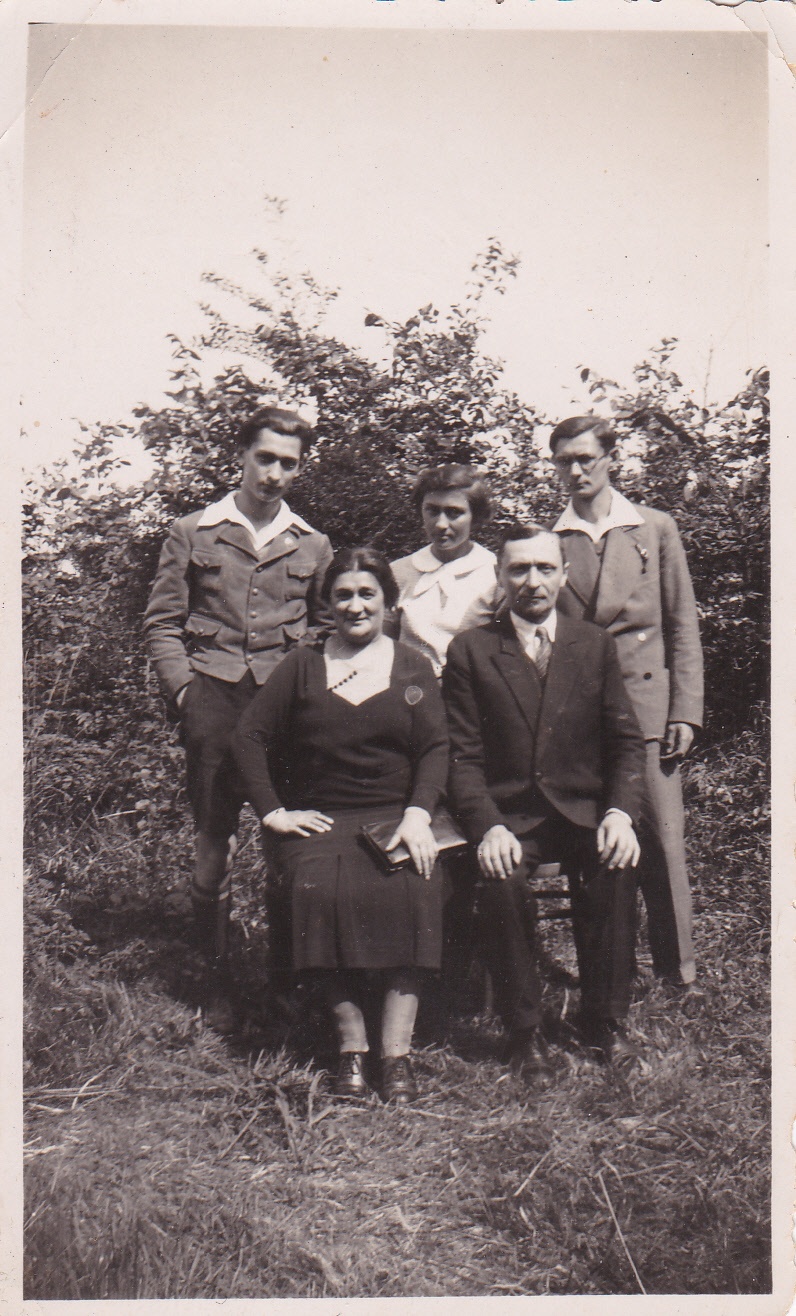
Gola Mire and her family

Prior to her imprisonment, Mire had begun a relationship with fellow Communist Olek Hausman. After escaping, Mire traveled to Warsaw looking for Olek, but discovered that he was in Bialystok. She located him there and together they went to Soviet-controlled Lvov where they were married. The Soviets appointed Mire as a member of city council and commissar. Olek left to join the Red Army when the Germans to Lvov in June 1941 and was not heard from again. Mire, who was pregnant, stayed behind and gave birth unassisted in a basement. She was able to contact the Spiner family, her cousins in the Krakow Ghetto. The Spiners sent a Polish friend to bring Mire to Krakow. Her baby died soon after her arrival.

=== Jewish resistance ===
While living in the Kraków Ghetto, Mire and her cousin, Vuschka Spiner, worked in a German factory that produced goods and supplies for the Nazi army. They sabotaged canned food produced there but stopped when Mire thought it became too dangerous. Mire left the ghetto in January 1942 and resumed contact with the Polish Worker's Party (PPR). She urged her comrades to assist the Jews of Poland as she predicted the Nazi's plans for the annihilation of the Jews, but was disappointed by their inaction. Seeking more support, Mire connected with active members of the Akiva and Dror Zionist organizations including Spiner's husband, Dolek Liebeskind, Shimshon Draenger (1917–1943), and Adolf (Avraham) Leibovich (1917–1943). With limited help from the PPR, Mire and her contacts arranged forrest guides and hiding places for friends outside the ghetto. These friends mostly consisted of those who were active in Iskra, a Jewish underground group, led by Heshek (Zvi) Bauminger (1919–1943). Iskra ultimately merged with the PPR. Mire and members of Akiva continued to express disappointment with the lack of support from the PPR.

Mire, Iskra, and the Jewish resistance group, He-Haluz ha-Lohem, implemented a December 22, 1942 attack on German soldiers at the Cyganeria Cafe. Eleven Germans were killed and thirteen were injured during the attack. Roughly twenty resistance fighters died in the operation.

=== Second imprisonment and death ===
In March 1943, Mire was arrested and sent to Montelupich Prison. She was tortured and kept in solitary confinement, but did not provide her captors with information. She became close with imprisoned women from He-Haluz ha-Lohem including resistance fighter, Tova Draenger. The women, along with Genia Meltzer-Scheinberg, planned an escape attempt after learning they were to be sent to the 'Hill of Death' in Plaszow. The women were moved from their basement cells to waiting trucks. A signal was given and the women ran en masse. Most of the women, including Mire, were killed during the escape attempt. Draenger was able to get away.

== Poetry ==
Mire often wrote poems in Yiddish and Hebrew, the themes of which were her husband and dead baby as well as Communism and resistance.
