= Szymon Drenger =

- Born: 1917; Kraków, Poland
- Died: 8 November 1943 (aged 25–26); Kraków, Poland

Szymon Drenger, also Szymon Draenger (1917 — 8 November 1943), was a Polish-Jewish partisan. He was the leader of a Jewish partisan organization known as the Fighting Pioneer, in Hebrew Hechalutz Ha'Lochem, during World War II. He and three other members of the Fighting Pioneer attacked and killed 20 German soldiers in a cafe. Szymon Drenger and his wife Gusta Dawidson Draenger were also part of the underground organization and both were killed by Gestapo on 8 November 1943.
