= Władysław Gurgacz =

Jesuit and resistance fighter (1914–1949)

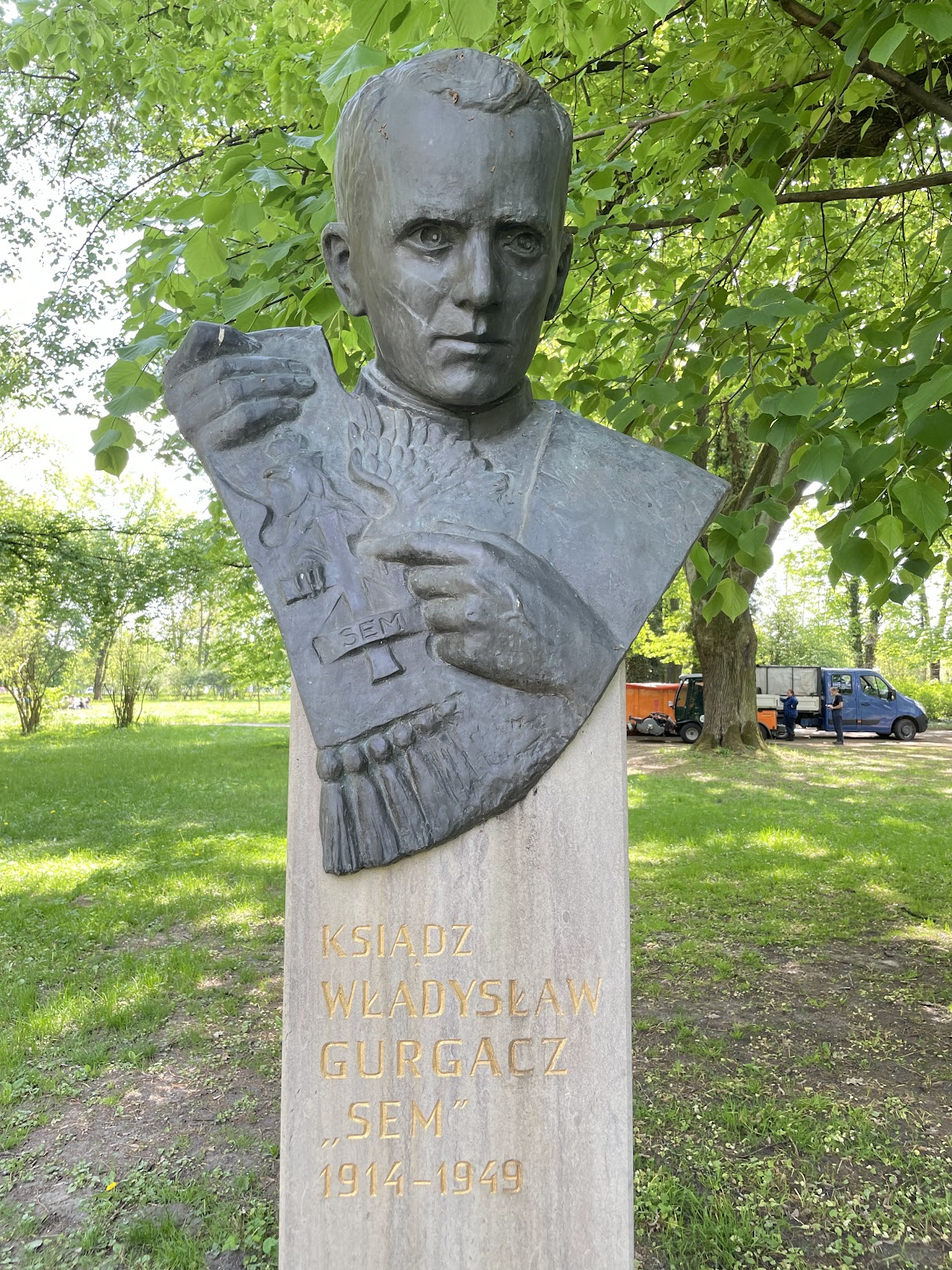
- Bust of Gurgacz in Henryk Jordan Park, Kraków
- Born: 2 April 1914; Jabłonica Polska, Congress Poland
- Died: 14 September 1949 (aged 35); Montelupich Prison, Kraków, Polish People's Republic
- Cause of death: Execution by firing squad
- Occupations: Catholic priest, soldier

Władysław Gurgacz (2 April 1914 – 14 September 1949) was a Polish Catholic priest, member of the Society of Jesus, and chaplain of the anti-communist underground.

== Biography ==
In 1931, he entered the Society of Jesus in Stara Wieś, and in 1942 he was ordained as chaplain.

After World War II, he strongly criticized communist order in Poland. It brought him immense popularity among believers. Between 1945 and 1947, he worked as hospital chaplain in Gorlice and from 1947 to 1948 in Krynica. It was there that he entered an armed unit of anti-communist underground Polish opposition; specifically, the Polish Underground Independency Army (Polska Podziemna Armia Niepodległościowa, PPAN). He was awarded the rank of captain. While serving with the army he convinced partisans to not carry out executions of Soviet NKVD collaborators and members of Polish Workers' Party and activists, who were beaten and forced to eat communist party identity cards.

On 2 July 1949, the partisans conducted operation against a Communist-controlled bank in Kraków in order to gain money needed to escape to Western Europe. They were caught and arrested by the Office of Public Security, and later in a show trial sentenced to death by judge Ludwik Kiełtyka. Although Gurgacz did not participate in the operation, he turned himself in and was executed by a firing squad on 14 September 1949 in Montelupich Prison in Kraków.

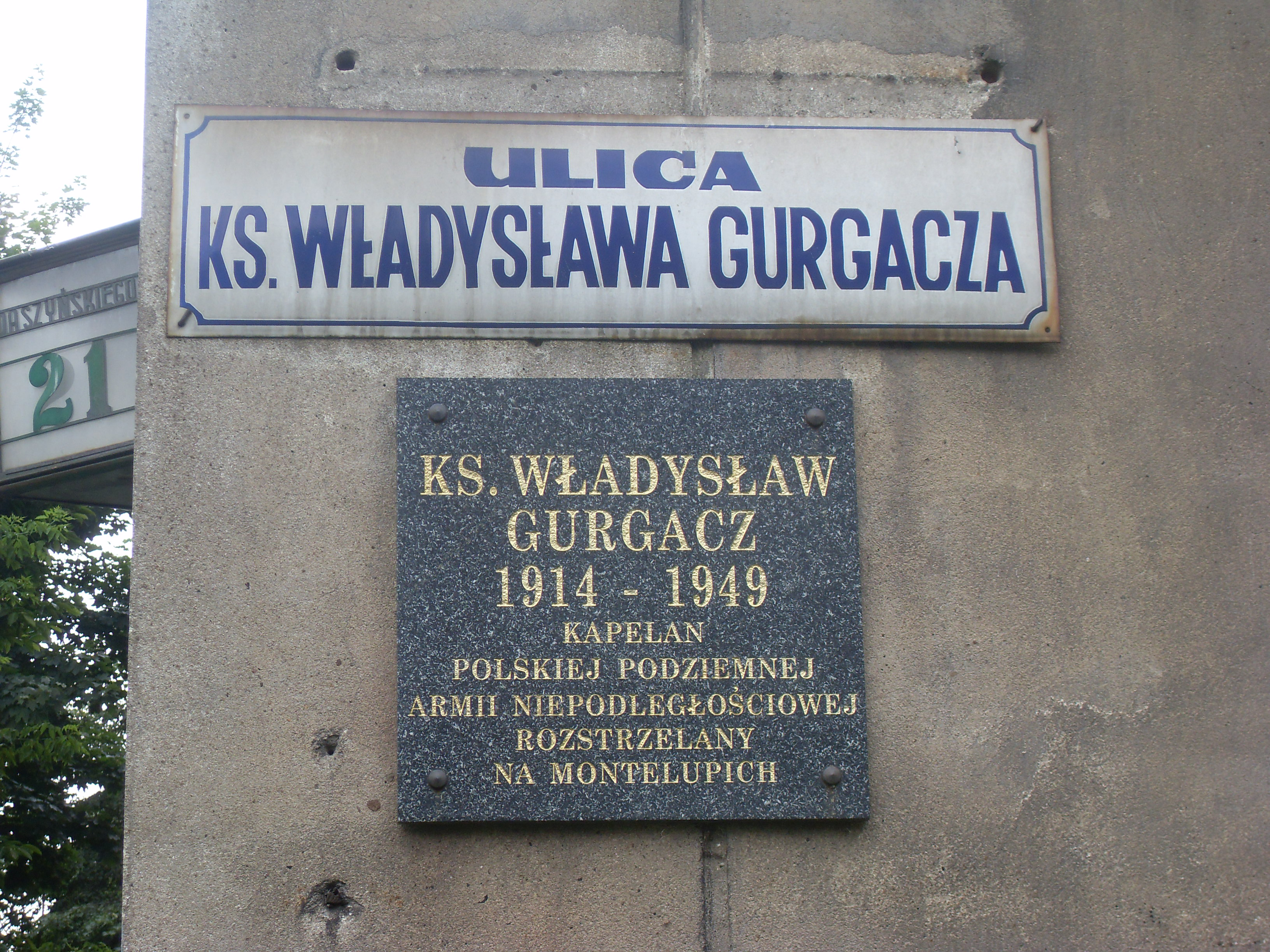
Władysław Gurgacz Street and memorial plaque in Kraków

There is an obelisk built to his memory at Hala Łabowska in Beskid Sądecki mountain range. Each year veterans of Armia Krajowa and PPAN meet at this place. Memorial plaques to Władysław Gurgacz and fallen soldiers of PPAN are located in churches in Nowy Sącz and Krynica. In June 2008, he was posthumously awarded Commander's Cross of the Order of Polonia Restituta.

In the 2008 citation letter accompanying the Commander's Cross, president Lech Kaczyński wrote:

Father Gurgacz knew, that by joining the ranks of the Polska Podziemna Armia Niepodległościowa [abr. PPAN], he closed the door to any possibility of return to normal life. In the name of God's love, and in the name of love for his country, he chose the fate of the doomed; those doomed by the communist propaganda, and those stripped from the protections of law. He chose the fate of those who were unceasingly hunted by the [communist] security apparatus, those who were mercilessly attacked, and when arrested, the fate of those inhumanly tortured and remanded to execution. [Rev. Gurgacz] didn't hesitate to take this path, and remained faithfully on it until the very end. Lech Aleksander Kaczyński, President of the Republic of Poland.

The body of Rev. Gurgacz was never returned to his family and his burial place remains unknown.
