= Montelupi =

Montelupi Coat of arms

The Montelupi family ennoblement in Renaissance Poland took place on June 22, 1567, in Kraków, at the St. Mary's Basilica (Mariacki Church). Two brothers, Italian-born merchants Sebastian Montelupi and Karol (Carlo) received the Montelupi (Wilczogórski) Coat of arms (pictured). Its replica can be seen on the late 16th century tomb of Sebastian Montelupi at the Kraków Basilica. According to Polish historian Józef Szymański there's no proof confirming that the heraldic blazon is authentic.

== Notes and references ==
- Tadeusz Gajl, Herb Montelupi i lista nazwisk w elektronicznej wersji Herbarza polskiego.
