= Joachim Knychała =

Polish serial killer

- Born: 8 September 1952; Bytom, Polish People's Republic
- Died: 28 October 1985 (aged 33); Montelupich Prison, Polish People's Republic
- Status: Executed by hanging
- Conviction: Murder (5 counts)
- Penalty: Death

Details
- Victims: 5
- Country: Poland
- Date apprehended: May 1982

Joachim Knychała (8 September 1952 – 28 October 1985) was a Polish serial killer, known as "The Vampire of Bytom" or "Frankenstein", who murdered five women between 1975 and 1982 in the Upper Silesian industrial region. He was apprehended, sentenced to death and hanged.

== Victims ==
The list contains names of the victims of Knychała, the place of murder and the date of the murder

1. Elżbieta Mikułowa – Piekary Śląskie; November 1975
2. Mirosława Sarnowska – Chorzów; 6 May 1976
3. Teresa Ryms – Bytom; 30 October 1976
4. Halina Syda – Piekary Śląskie; 23 June 1979
5. Bogusława Ludyga – Piekary Śląskie; 8 May 1982

== See also ==
- List of serial killers by country
