= Sebastiano Montelupi =

Sebastiano Montelupi de Mari
- Commemorative stamp issue, 2008 (detail).
- Born: 1516; Florence, Italy
- Died: 18 August 1600 (aged 83–84); Kraków
- Monuments: Montelupi Monument, St. Mary's Basilica, Kraków
- Other name: Sebastian Wilczogórski
- Citizenship: Florentine (awarded 1567)
- Occupations: merchant, banker, postmaster
- Years active: 1557–1600
- Title: Master of the Royal Posts
- Term: 1568–1600
- Predecessor: Pietro Maffon
- Successor: Valerio Tamburini Montelupi
- Spouse(s): Urszula Baza (1551–1586), m. 1567
- Partner: Carlo Montelupi (younger brother)
- Children: Valerio Tamburini Montelupi (adopted)
- Parent: Valerio Montelupi de Mari
Montelupi
- Coat of arms

Sebastiano Montelupi (Polish: Sebastian Montelupi, name occasionally Polonized as Wilczogórski, 1516 – 18 August 1600), was an Italian-born merchant and banker in Kraków, Poland, and Postmaster General of the Polish royal postal service under Sigismund II Augustus, Henry III of Poland, Anna Jagiellon, Stephen Báthory and Sigismund III Vasa.

== Life ==
Montelupi was born in Florence in 1516. Little is known about his early life. He left Italy in 1536, settling in the Kingdom of Poland in 1557. He worked for the merchants and bankers Carlo and Bernardo Soderini until establishing himself independently in partnership with his younger brother Carlo.

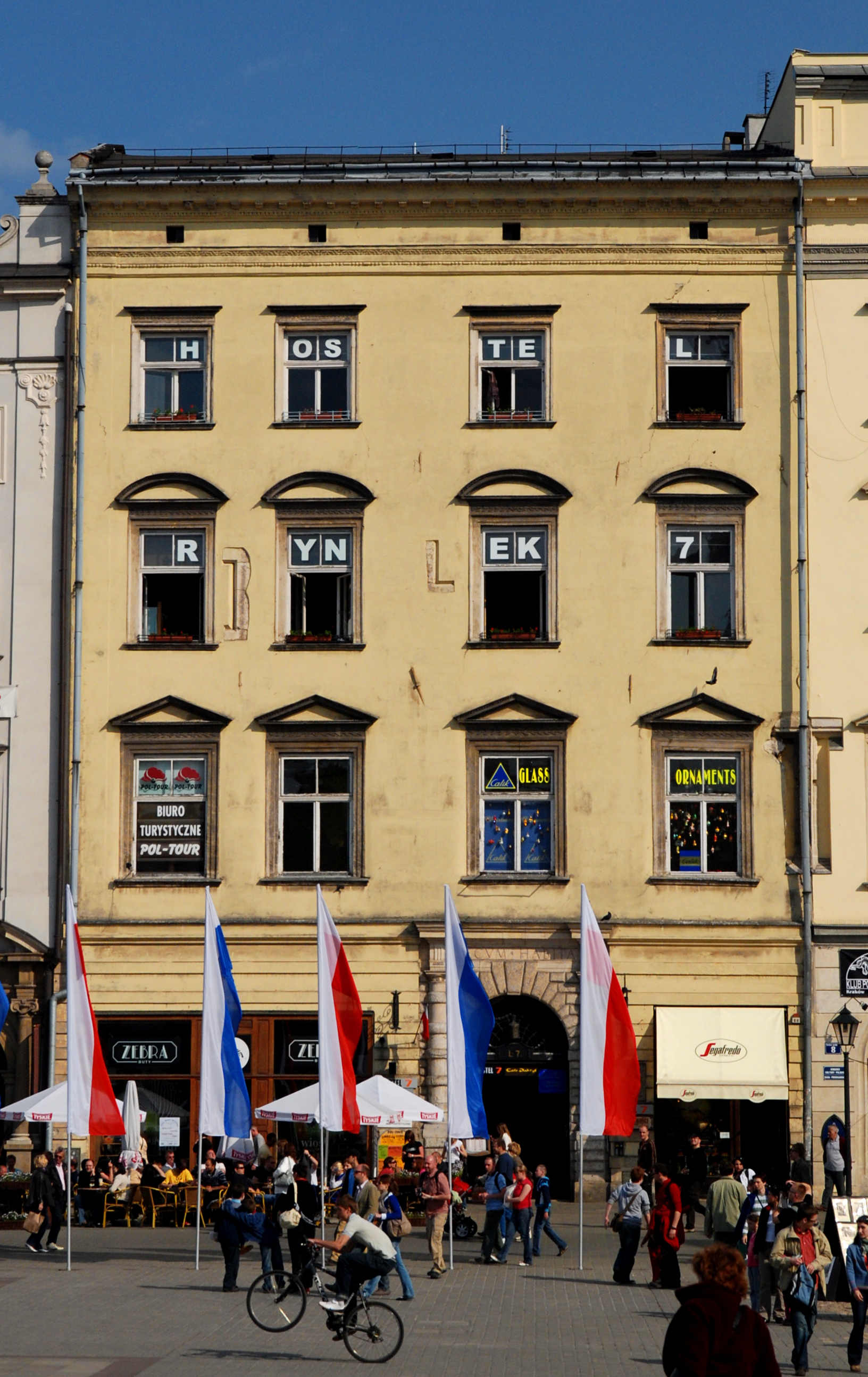
Montelupi House (now a hostel) on the main square in Kraków

In 1567 he married the teenaged Urszula, daughter of a doctor of medicine Wojciech Baza (died 1569), physician to the court. The year after the wedding the couple moved into a kamienica residence in the centre of Kraków, rebuilt in the Renaissance style. This building, known as the Italian House or Montelupi House, also served as the central post office. Urszula was to die without surviving issue on 12 July 1586, aged 35, after 19 years of marriage. At one point Francesco Pucci had consulted John Dee on Montelupi's behalf, to determine whether their childlessness could be due to witchcraft.

== Career ==
As a merchant, Montelupi traded with Italy, Germany, England, Austria and Russia. As a banker, his clients included the papal nuncios at the Polish court. In 1574, the city reimbursed Montelupi a little over fl.1,827 for his contributions to the ceremony of receiving and performing hommage to the new king, Henry III; these contributions included a yard and a half of red Chinese cloth for the dish holding the keys to the city, and a number of vermeil vessels and a large silver vase that were presented to the king. In 1581 Montelupi advanced fl.3,000 to King Stephen Báthory to help finance that year's campaign against Muscovy. Towards the end of his life he became court banker to King Sigismund III, and consul of the Italian community in the capital. In the 1580s he funded the publication of work by the Franciscan writer Annibale Rosselli. He died in Kraków on 18 August 1600, aged 84, leaving an estate valued at fl.150,000. He was succeeded by his nephew and adopted heir, Valerio Tamburini Montelupi (1548–1613), who thus became the richest citizen in Kraków.

=== Master of the Royal Post ===
From 1568 Montelupi was the postmaster general of the Polish Royal Post (succeeding Pietro Maffon), running one public service to Vilnius (in three weeks) and another to Vienna and Venice (in ten days). These services were suspended in 1572 and when resumed in 1574 were reserved for the carriage of royal messages. In 1583 he was confirmed as the royal postmaster general by the new king, Stephen Báthory, on condition he maintain public deliveries between the major cities of the Polish–Lithuanian Commonwealth, and an international service to and from Venice at least twice each month. His position enabled Montelupi to provide high-level information services for correspondents including the Medici in Florence and the Fugger in Augsburg.

At Sebastiano's death the postmastership also passed to his nephew Valerio, and in time to Valerio's descendants, the last postmaster of the dynasty being Carlo Montelupi de Mari (died 1662). Another Italian, Angelo Maria Bandinelli, then became royal postmaster general.

== Commemoration ==
A magnificent monument to Sebastiano Montelupi and his wife Urszula was erected in St. Mary's Basilica, Kraków. The work has been attributed to the workshop of Italian-Polish architect and sculptor Santi Gucci.

A street in Kraków is named after his family, as is his kamienica, and a palace built by his descendants.

In 2008 a commemorative stamp set celebrating the 450th anniversary of the Polish postal service was issued, featuring portraits of Prosper Provano and Sebastiano Montelupi. The portrait of Montelupi was based on the effigy incorporated into the Montelupi monument.

== See also ==
- Montelupich Prison along the Montelupich Street in Kraków, the notorious Gestapo torture chamber throughout World War II.

== Bibliography ==
- Danuta Quirini-Popławska, Działalność Sebastiana Montelupiego w Krakowie w drugiej połowie XVI wieku, Kraków, 1980.
- Danuta Quirini-Popławska, Korespondencja Sebastiana i Valeria Montelupich (1575–1609), Wrocław, Wydawnictwo "Ossolineum", 1986.
- Danuta Quirini-Popławska, Sebastiano Montelupi, toscano, mercante e maestro della Posta Reale di Cracovia: Saggio sulle comunicazioni Polonia-Italia nel '500, Quaderni di storia postali 13; Istituto di studi storici postali, 1989.
