= Gusta Dawidson Draenger =

Polish Jewish activist and writer

Gusta Dawidson Dranger
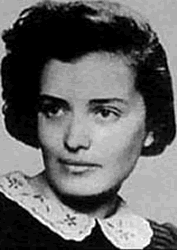
- Born: Gusta Dawidson; 1917; Kraków, Poland
- Died: 8 November 1943 (aged 25–26)
- Cause of death: Execution
- Other names: Justina, Justyna, Tova, Gusta Davidson
- Known for: Diary about the Jewish resistance in Kraków
- Spouse: Szymon Drenger

Gusta (Tova) Dawidson Draenger, code name Justyna (1917 – November 1943), was a Polish Jewish activist in Kraków in the late 1930s and during the Nazi occupation in World War II. She wrote a detailed account of her activities while in Montelupich Prison in early 1943. Her husband Shimshon Draenger and she were executed by the Nazis in November 1943. Her memoirs were published first in Poland as Pamiętnik Justyny in 1946, then in Hebrew as יומנה של יוסטינה or Jōmānā šel Jusṭina (Justina's Diary) in 1974 and in English as Justyna's Narrative in 1996.

== Early life ==
Born in Kraków, Gusta Dawidson was brought up in an Orthodox Jewish family of the Gur hasidim tradition. While at school, she became a member of the Agudat Yisrael youth movement. She later joined the Akiva youth movement where she actively contributed to education, becoming a member of the central committee. She wrote for and edited the youth newspaper, Zeirim, and kept the movement's records.

== Resistance During World War II ==
Following the German and Soviet invasion of Poland in September 1939, many older members of the organization moved to Palestine. Dawidson, who remained in Europe, was one of the founders of He-Haluz Ha-Lohem ("The Fighting Pioneer"), an underground combat group in Kraków's resistance movement. She befriended Szymon Drenger, an Akiba leader and editor of its journal Divrei Akiva and the weekly Tse'irim.

In September 1939, the Gestapo arrested Draenger for including an article by the anti-Nazi Austrian Irene Harand his Divrei Akiva. He was sent to the Troppau concentration camp near Opava. Now his fiancée, Gusta Dawidson gave herself up to the Germans and asked to be allowed to join him. In early 1940, thanks to a huge bribe, the two were released but had to report regularly to the Gestapo. They nevertheless continued to meet secretly with the members of their movement and soon married.

The Draengers continued their resistance despite the surveillance. They continued to meet with movement members. Shimshon forged identity documents that allowed movement members to freely move among the ghettos in safe houses that Gusta had found. The sale of these papers helped fund the underground.

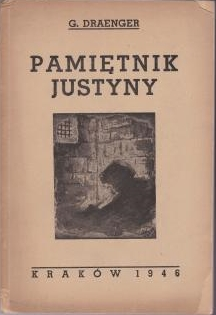
Cover of the original Pamiętnik Justyny (1946)

Following the December 22, 1942 attack on Cyganeria Café (which was frequented by German officers), Shimshon Draenger was arrested on 18 January 1943. When Gusta searched for him and the Gestapo discovered their relationship, they also arrested her. He was sent to Montelupich Prison, and she was imprisoned at Helzlaw women's prison across the street. While there, between frequent sessions during which she was tortured, she wrote her memoirs on toilet paper that had been smuggled in and hid them in a doorpost. She continued to write despite having her fingers crushed while being tortured, occasionally dictating to her cellmates while other women sang to disguise the sound of her voice. Draenger believed that it was important to document the rebellion for future generations.

While in prison, Gusta brought high morale to the other prisoners. According to one anecdote, Shimshon was brought to see Gusta after she was tortured, with the hope that he would then reveal underground secrets. However, Gusta reportedly proudly declared her relationship with the underground, to raise her husband's morale.

On 29 April 1943, the couple escaped with several other prisoners before they were supposed to be taken to the Kraków-Płaszów concentration camp. Gusta Draenger and Genia Meltzer were the only women who survived the escape. Eventually, Shimshon and Gusta reunited in Bochnia, then proceeding to a bunker in the Nowy Wiśnicz forest from where they continued to fight. Shimshon wrote and edited the resistance newspaper He-Haluz Ha-Lohem, 250 copies of which were distributed every Friday to the Bochnia and Tarnow ghettos and to surviving Jewish refugees and surviving fighters. While trying to escape across the Hungarian border, they were arrested by the Germans and executed on 8 November 1943.

== Diary publication ==
Gusta Dawidson Draenger's diary was written from February to the end of April 1943. Although Gusta requested that her diary be recovered from her cell, Number 15, she did not reveal where it was hidden out of fear that it would be found by the wrong hands. However, one of the Jewish slave laborers heard that a Polish builder had found some written pages under a cells' flooring. The laborer asked for the papers, which were eventually given to the Jewish Historical Society of Cracow.

In 1946, Draenger's diary was published as Justina's Diary. Chairman of the Cracow Jewish Historical Society Dov Johanes brought the manuscript with him when he emigrated to Israel. Akiva member Meir Zinger translated the diary into Hebrew. In 1953, the Hebrew translation was published by the Ghetto Fighters' House. In 1996, an English translation was published by the University of Massachusetts Press. The English version also included additional transcriptions of the scraps. A version with the newly discovered first chapter of the diary is being prepared by the Ghetto Fighters House.
