= Andrzej Czabański =

Polish murderer

- Born: November 5, 1959; Tarnów, Polish People's Republic
- Died: April 21, 1988 (aged 28); Montelupich Prison, Poland
- Years active: 1984
- Known for: Last person executed in Poland
- Spouse: Married (unnamed)
- Status: Executed by hanging
- Conviction: Murder
- Criminal charges: Murder, rape, attempted murder
- Penalty: Death

Details
- Victims: Iwona Nowak (murdered); Daria and Emilia Nowak (attempted)
- Locations: Skrzyszów and Tarnów, Poland
- Weapon: Heavy tool
- Date apprehended: 12 June 1984
- Imprisoned at: 1984–1988

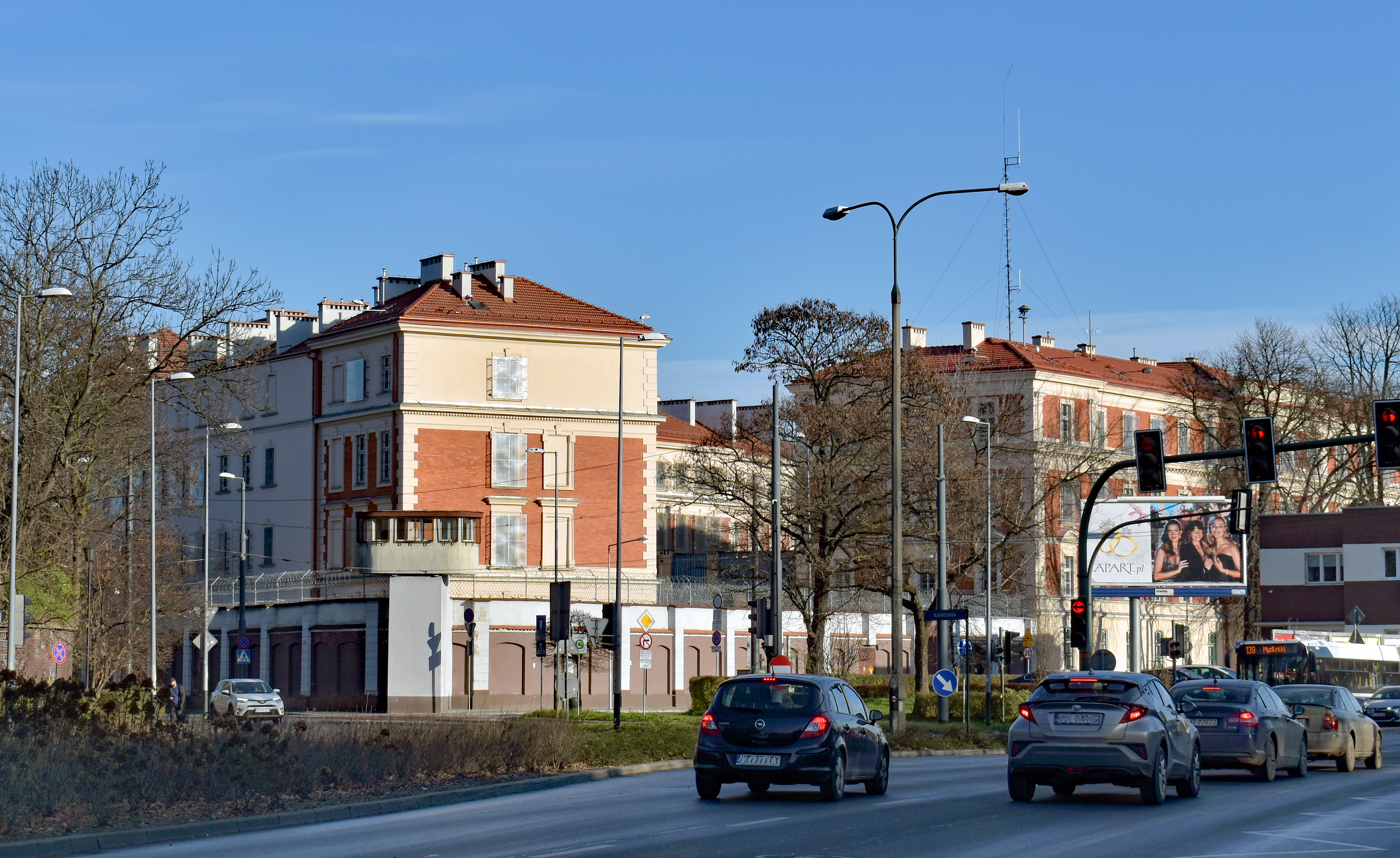
Former Austro-Hungarian Army Garrison Prison, 7 Montelupich street, Kraków, Poland

Andrzej Czabański (5 November 1959 – 21 April 1988) was a Polish murderer and rapist, and the last person executed in Poland before capital punishment was abolished in the nation.

== Life and crime ==
At the time of the murder for which Czabański would be executed, Czabański was married. He and his wife lived in Tarnów, southern Poland. At the time of the murder, Czabański's wife was nine months pregnant. He was brought up on the Skowronków street, close to the woman who he would eventually murder, Iwona Nowak, and Nowak had visited Czabański's mother before.

On 11 June 1984, Czabański delivered his wife to the hospital to give birth; he then proceeded to go out drinking with friends. After he returned home, he lured Iwona Nowak (sometimes given the pseudonym "Anna B."), who was in her late 40s at the time, from her house under the pretense of giving her a ride to a post office (under false claim of being there an overseas call from the USA where the women's husband worked). Rather than taking her to the post office, he took her to a field in a nearby village Skrzyszów, where he raped her and beat her to death with a heavy tool. After the attack and murder, Czabański returned to Iwona's home. His intention was to murder her two teenage daughters, Daria and Emilia, to keep them from implicating him in the crime. The girls screamed, which scared Czabański away before he could murder them. The next day, he turned himself in to the police, who brought him into custody.

Czabański made a full confession to the murder, even leading the police to the location in the field where he left his victim's body. When he went on trial, the court held a hearing to determine Czabański's sanity. The hearing concluded that he was sane and had low marks in school, but he was of average intelligence; although he was asocial, he was not determined to be a psychopath. The hearing also revealed facts about Czabański's past, like the fact that his father was an abusive alcoholic and died in 1984, sometime before the crime occurred; Czabański followed in his footsteps and started drinking at 15. On 12 June 1986, a Polish Court in Tarnów found Czabański guilty of Iwona Nowak's murder and sentenced him to death by hanging, news which he apparently received calmly.

== Appeals and impending moratorium ==
Czabański appealed his death sentence aggressively after his conviction, and he received much support from his family in his efforts, with his mother, Teresa, making public appeals on behalf of her son and his lawyer launching several post-conviction relief efforts, to no avail. Ultimately, the Council of State refused to commute Czabański's death sentence to life or a lesser jail term.

Czabański's death sentence had inconvenient timing as well, considering that during the time that he spent on death row, Polish legislators were in discussions to abolish the death penalty nationwide for civilian crimes. However, although Czabański and his family allegedly hoped that they could postpone his execution until after abolition came to fruition in Poland, those talks never resulted in any meaningful change in legislation before Czabański's execution took place. In fact, shortly before Czabański's execution, a Polish lawmaker drafted legislation to place a moratorium on the death penalty, but it was not enforced until after the execution took place.

== Execution ==
On 21 April 1988, at approximately 5:10 p.m., Czabański was executed by hanging in Kraków's Montelupich Prison, where civilian death sentences were known to have been carried out. He was 28 years old. His last request before death was for a cigarette.

Poland's method of hanging was different from that which many other parts of the Western world, like the United Kingdom, the United States, and Australia, among others, and was using "short drop" hangings, subjecting the prisoner to death by slow strangulation.

On 21 April 1988, Czabański was brought into the death chamber wearing a denim prison uniform. Witnesses claimed that it took Czabański approximately 20 minutes to strangle to death.

== Aftermath ==
Just over a year after Czabański's execution, the United Nations declared a moratorium on the death penalty in its member nations. Accordingly, Poland enacted its own moratorium on December 7, 1989; between 1989 and 1996, Poland sentenced 10 individuals to death, all for murder, but none of them were ever executed. In 1997, capital punishment was abolished in Poland for both peacetime and wartime crimes.

Sometime after Czabański's execution, Iwona Nowak's surviving immediate family members moved out of Poland. Her husband moved to the United States, where he died sometime later. Daria's whereabouts were unknown outside of the fact that she no longer lived in Poland; there was no trace of what happened to Emilia.

== See also ==
- Capital punishment in Poland
- Capital punishment in Europe
