= Kraków-Podgórze Detention Centre =

Historic building in Kraków, Poland

Former Imperial and Royal Podgórze county court and prison
- Dawny; Cesarski i królewski Sąd Powiatowy Podgórza i Areszt
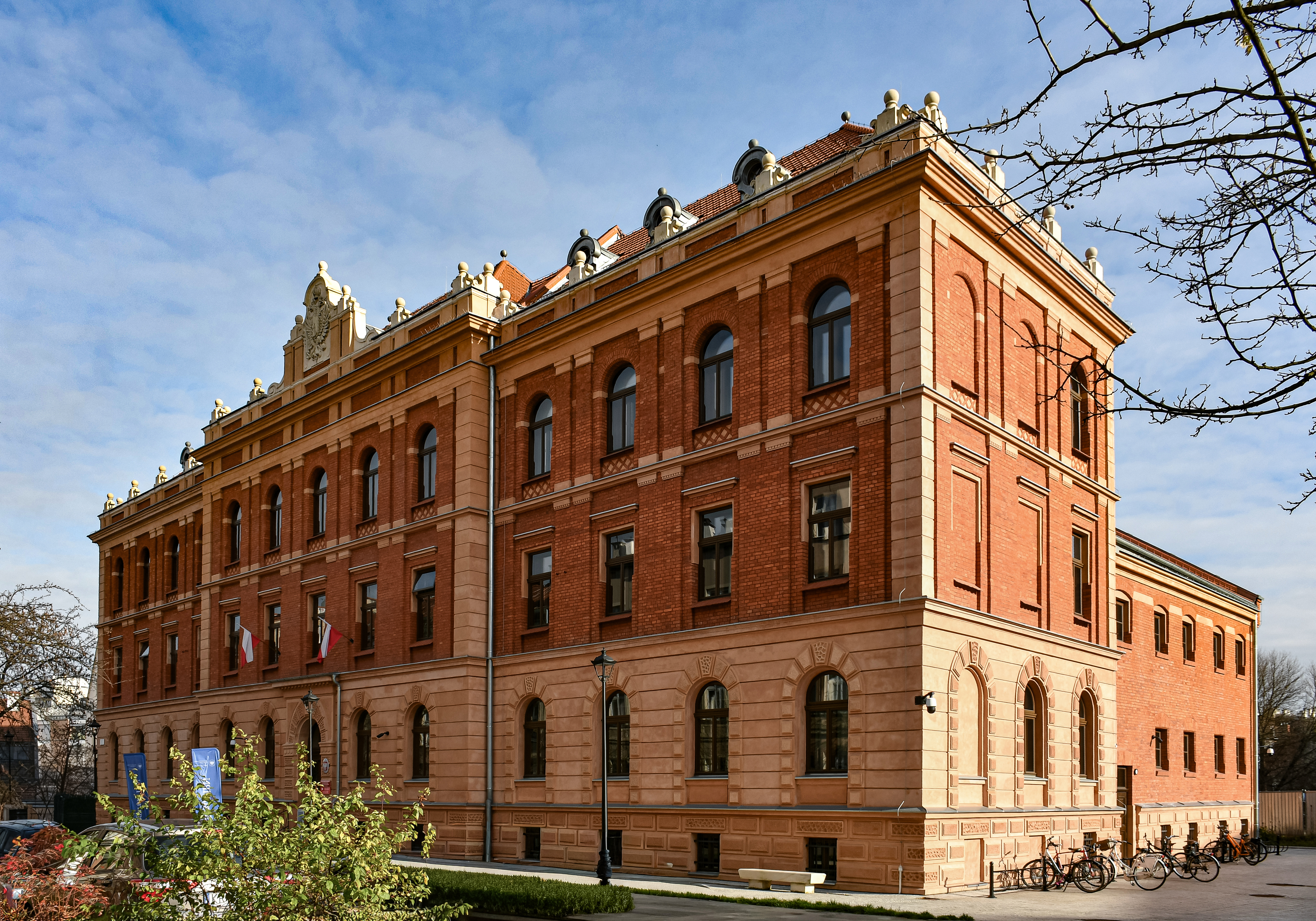
- Interactive map of the Former; Imperial and Royal Podgórze county court and prison area

General information
- Type: court and prison
- Location: 3 Czarnieckiego Street; Kraków; Poland
- Coordinates: 50°02′40″N 19°57′18.5″E
- Construction started: 1905

Design and construction
- Architect: Ferdynand Liebling

Historic Monument of Poland
- Designated: 1994-09-08
- Part of: Kraków historical city complex
- Reference no.: M.P. 1994 nr 50 poz. 418

The Former Kraków-Podgórze Detention Centre (Polish: Dawny Areszt Śledczy Kraków Podgórze) - a historic building of the former Imperial and Royal Podgórze county court and detention center located at 3 Stefana Czarnieckiego Street in Podgórze, the former district of Kraków, Poland. Built in 1905, from design by Ferdynand Liebling.

During World War II, it was a Nazi German prison, a place of secret detention and torture of Polish members of the Resistance, It is memorialized as a notorious site of martyrdom during the German occupation of Poland. The prison facility had a Gestapo station attached to it.

The prison was initially incorporated within the borders of the Kraków Ghetto when that district was created by the Nazis in March 1941; however, in the redistricting of June 1942 (following mass deportations of the Ghetto population) the whole street was placed outside the confines of the Ghetto.

== Overview ==
In Polish literature, the prison is commonly referred to simply as więzienie przy ulicy Czarnieckiego ("the prison in Czarniecki Street"). The facility comprises the main building, constructed in 1905 (since 1996 listed in the register of historical monuments), and the adjoining parcel of land covering 3,133 square metres and surrounding the building on both sides and at the back (bounded on the south by the ulica Rękawka). The grounds were used by the Nazis as execution grounds during the Second World War which ended here with the liberation of Kraków on 18 January 1945. The facility was used by the Nazis as a de facto subsidiary (Zweiganstalt) of the significantly larger facility in the Montelupich Prison. Among the numerous victims murdered here is counted the Polish poet, Zuzanna Ginczanka. The prison is mentioned in the diaries of Holocaust survivors, such as Stanisław Taubenschlag (b. 1920; the son of Rafał Taubenschlag), and was the place of imprisonment by the Nazis of Polish elite represented by the sculptor, Jan Krzyczkowski (1910–1980). It appears in the memoirs of Tadeusz Pankiewicz, the proprietor of the famous Under the Eagle Pharmacy nearby, featured in the award-winning film, Schindler's List. The various methods of torture used by the Nazis against the detainees included an early form of waterboarding performed in a bathtub full of water, which close family members of the victims specially brought to the prison for the occasion were made to witness as an added terror tactic (e.g., in the case of Józef Świstak nom de guerre Bunkier, a member of the Szare Szeregi, d. 1944, whose mother was made to witness his martyrdom). The prison was a military target in the attempts by the Armia Krajowa to free prisoners incarcerated there. Most of those imprisoned at Czarnieckiego 3 could not be helped.

During the Nazi occupation of Poland, the total number of prisoners averaged at 150 at any one time: for example, the records for 25 May 1942 show a total of 165. On another occasion during the War, there were just 59 prisoners, including 5 women. Resistance movement was active within the prison, and prisoners had access to clandestine literature of the underground, while inside information on the prison was being secretly sent out to the Polish government-in-exile. On 3 February 1944 the prison was placed under the authority of the commander (Kommandeur) for the Kraków region (Distrikt Krakau) of the Sicherheitspolizei (Security Police) and of the Sicherheitsdienst (Intelligence Service), at which time the existing prisoners were transferred to alternative locations. The post of the Kommandeur of these two services was occupied from September 1943 until the end of the Nazi rule in Kraków on 17 January 1945 by Rudolf Batz (1903–1961) — who for fifteen and a half years after the War (until November 1960) avoided capture by living under an assumed identity.

After the War, the facility continued to be used by the communist authorities of Poland for detention of political prisoners in the Soviet-backed struggle for control over the Polish nation: in March 1946 the prison housed 275 inmates.

== Physical structure ==
The building — not intended for prison use — was originally designed by the Polish architect Ferdynand Liebling (1877–1942) as a mixed-use courthouse-cum-taxation office for the town of Podgórze and constructed in 1905 when the area was under Austrian occupation. The date of the establishment of prison facilities on the premises is unknown. Podgórze, originally a separate town, was incorporated into the municipality of Kraków by a decision of the Podgórze city council in 1915. Wartime records, including the memoirs of Tadeusz Pankiewicz, indicate that a court was still functional here in Nazi times of the Second World War, at least nominally (the prison being the chief feature), while communist-era press reports cite an operational circuit court together with the prison on the premises in post-War years, suggesting a conversion to an all-prison use in 1971 when the court ceased operations. The prison administration quarters housed in the post-War years an office of the District Commission for the Investigation of Nazi Crimes (Okręgowa Komisja Badania Zbrodni Hitlerowskich, a defunct governmental body now subsumed within the IPN whose purview includes Communist in addition to Nazi crimes).

During the Third Republic, on 22 May 1996, the prison complex was entered on the register of historical monuments protected by law, a fact further confirmed by an additional resolution of the City Council of 28 June 2006.

== Current status ==
The building is the quarter of the Institute of National Remembrance (IPN).

Materials pertaining to crimes against humanity committed at Czarnieckiego 3 during the Second World War are preserved at the Institute of National Remembrance in Warsaw, and at other archives in Poland (listed in part in Obozy hitlerowskie na ziemiach polskich 1939–1945: informator encyklopedyczny; see Bibliography) and at the Bad Arolsen Archives in Germany.

== Disambiguation ==
The Czarnieckiego Prison in the Kraków district of Podgórze is not to be confused with the central prison (Zentral-Gefängnis) of the Łódź Ghetto (Ghetto Litzmannstadt), which was (historically) located in a Łódź street of the same name (the ul. Czarnieckiego) at number 14/16 (street renamed Schneidergasse by the Nazis, and the building indicated at number 12). Like the prison discussed in the present article, the Łódź jail is frequently mentioned in the memoirs of Holocaust survivors (for example, by Holocaust witness Sara Zyskind (1927–1994), who speaks about "the prison on Czarniecki Street"). That facility is now defunct, and the building that housed it no longer extant.

== See also ==
- Prisons in Poland

== Bibliography ==
- Tadeusz Wroński, Kronika okupowanego Krakowa, Kraków, Wydawnictwo Literackie, 1974.
- Obozy hitlerowskie na ziemiach polskich 1939–1945: informator encyklopedyczny, ed. Cz. Pilichowski et al. (for the Główna Komisja Badania Zbrodni Hitlerowskich w Polsce and the Rada Ochrony Pomników Walki i Męczeństwa), Warsaw, Państwowe Wydawnictwo Naukowe, 1979. ISBN 8301000651. (A encyclopaedic guide to Nazi camps and prisons in historically Polish lands between 1939 and 1945, an official publication of the Central Commission for the Investigation of Nazi Crimes in Poland, a governmental body of the People's Republic of Poland whose functions are now performed by the IPN; valuable for its listings of archival materials.)
- Wincenty Hein & Czesława Jakubiec, Montelupich, Kraków, Wydawnictwo Literackie, 1985. ISBN 8308003931.
- Women in the Holocaust: A Collection of Testimonies, comp. & tr. J. Eibeshitz & A. Eilenberg-Eibeshitz, vol. 2, Brooklyn (New York), Remember, 1994. ISBN 0932351468, ISBN 0932351476.
- Agnieszka Legutko-Ołownia, Kraków's Kazimierz: Town of Partings and Returns, Kraków, Wydawnictwo Bezdroża, 2004. ISBN 8389676117.
- Aleksander B. Skotnicki & Władysław Klimczak, Społeczność żydowska w Polsce: zwyczaje i udział w walce o Niepodległość: dwa oblicza krakowskich Żydów, Kraków, Wydawnictwo AA, 2006. ISBN 9788389368577. (On Liebling.)
- Informator o zasobie archiwalnym Instytutu Pamięci Narodowej, ed. J. Bednarek & R. Leśkiewicz, Warsaw, Instytut Pamięci Narodowej — Komisja Ścigania Zbrodni przeciwko Narodowi Polskiemu, 2009. ISBN 9788376290683. ("A Guide to the Archival Holdings of the IPN", an official publication of the Institute of National Remembrance, a governmental body with broad police powers for prosecution of crimes against the Polish Nation, it misspells the name of the street in the prison's address as "ulica Czarneckiego [sic] 3".)
- Description of the current state of the facility on the Prison Administration website of the Polish Ministry of Justice (Unreliable on historical details, but the only official source on the present-day status of the prison.)
