= Italian House, Kraków =

Building in Kraków, Poland

Coordinates: 50°3′39″N 19°56′18″E

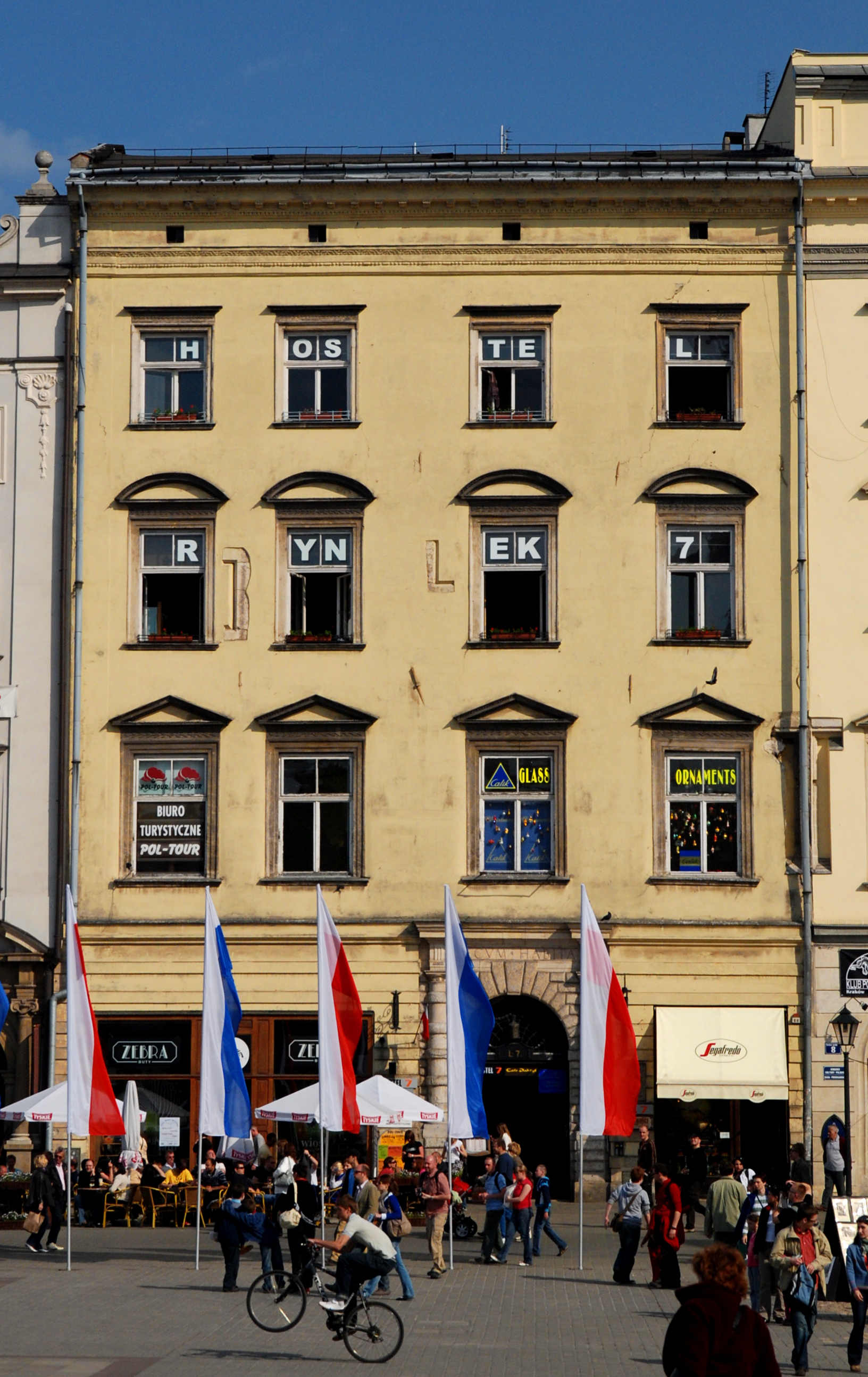
Italian House, Kraków, Poland

Italian House (also known as the Italian Kamienica, Montelupi House or Montelupi Kamienica, Polish: Dom Włoski w Krakowie, Włoska Kamienica, Kamienica Montelupich) is a kamienica building in Main Square, Kraków, Poland. It was built in the 16th century by Sebastian Montelupi, and served as a headquarters of the Polish Post, and one of the centers of Italian culture in Kraków. When it was operating as a postal centre stagecoaches to Venice departed from here.

The building is classified as a monument.
