= Montelupi Prison =

Prison in Kraków, Poland

Montelupich Prison
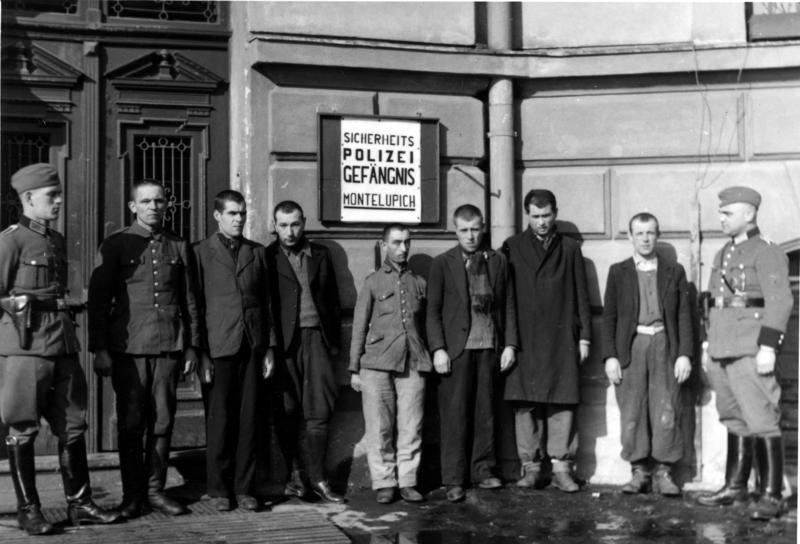
- Fig. 1: Prisoners of the Montelupich Prison in 1939 after Nazi Germany's invasion of Poland
- Interactive map of Montelupich Prison
- Location: Kraków, Poland; 50°4′27″N 19°56′23″E
- Status: Correctional facility, museum
- Opened: 1905
- Managed by: Służba Więzienna (pl)

The Montelupich Prison (Polish: Więzienie Montelupich) is a historic prison in Kraków, Poland. It was built in the 16th century and converted into part of a military tribunal in the 19th century. (Note: Ulica Montelupich ("street of the Montelupis") itself is named after the Montelupi manor house (kamienica) located at Montelupich street Number 7, the so called Kamienica Montelupich built in the 16th century, and in the 19th century adapted as part of the Austrian military tribunal.) It was used by the Gestapo during World War II and has been called "one of the most terrible Nazi prisons in [occupied] Poland". The Gestapo took over the facility from the German Sicherheitspolizei at the end of March 1941. One of the Nazi officials responsible for overseeing the Montelupich Prison was Ludwig Hahn.

The prison population during World War II consisted predominantly of ethnically Polish political prisoners and victims of Gestapo street raids in Poland, but it also housed German SS and Security Service (SD) members serving jail terms. Other occupants included British and Soviet spies, parachutists, soldiers who had deserted the Waffen-SS, and convicts of ordinary crimes. Between 1940 and 1944, approximately 50,000 prisoners either passed through Montelupich or died in it. Kurkiewiczowa states that the interrogation methods employed by the Germans were equivalent to "medieval tortures".

Although the inscription on the plaque by the side door of the prison in the attached 1939 photograph (Fig. 1) reads, "Sicherheits-Polizei-Gefängnis Montelupich", the name "Montelupich Prison" is informal, having been accepted into history only because of popular usage. The Montelupich facility was the detention center of the first instance used by the Nazis to imprison the Polish professors from Jagiellonian University arrested in 1939 in the so-called Sonderaktion Krakau, an operation designed to eliminate Polish intelligentsia. Over 1,700 Polish prisoners were eventually massacred at Fort 49 of the Kraków Fortress and its adjacent forest, and deportations of Polish prisoners to concentration camps, including Ravensbrück and Auschwitz, were also carried out. The prison also contained a cell for kidnapped Polish children under the age of 10, with an average capacity of about 70 children, who were then sent to concentration camps and executed. In January 1944, 232 prisoners from Montelupich were executed by a Nazi firing squad at Pełkinie. In late January or early February 1944, Wilhelm Koppe issued an order for the execution of 100 Montelupich prisoners as a reprisal for the unsuccessful assassination attempt on Hans Frank. In Wola Filipowska (near Kraków), a monument commemorates the Nazi execution of 42 hostages, all Montelupich prisoners who died on the spot before a firing squad on 23 November 1943.

After World War II, Montelupich became a Soviet prison where NKVD and Urząd Bezpieczeństwa tortured and murdered Polish soldiers of the Home Army. Currently, the building serves as a temporary arrest and detention facility for men and women, with 158 jail cells and a prison hospital with an additional 22 cells.

== History of the property ==
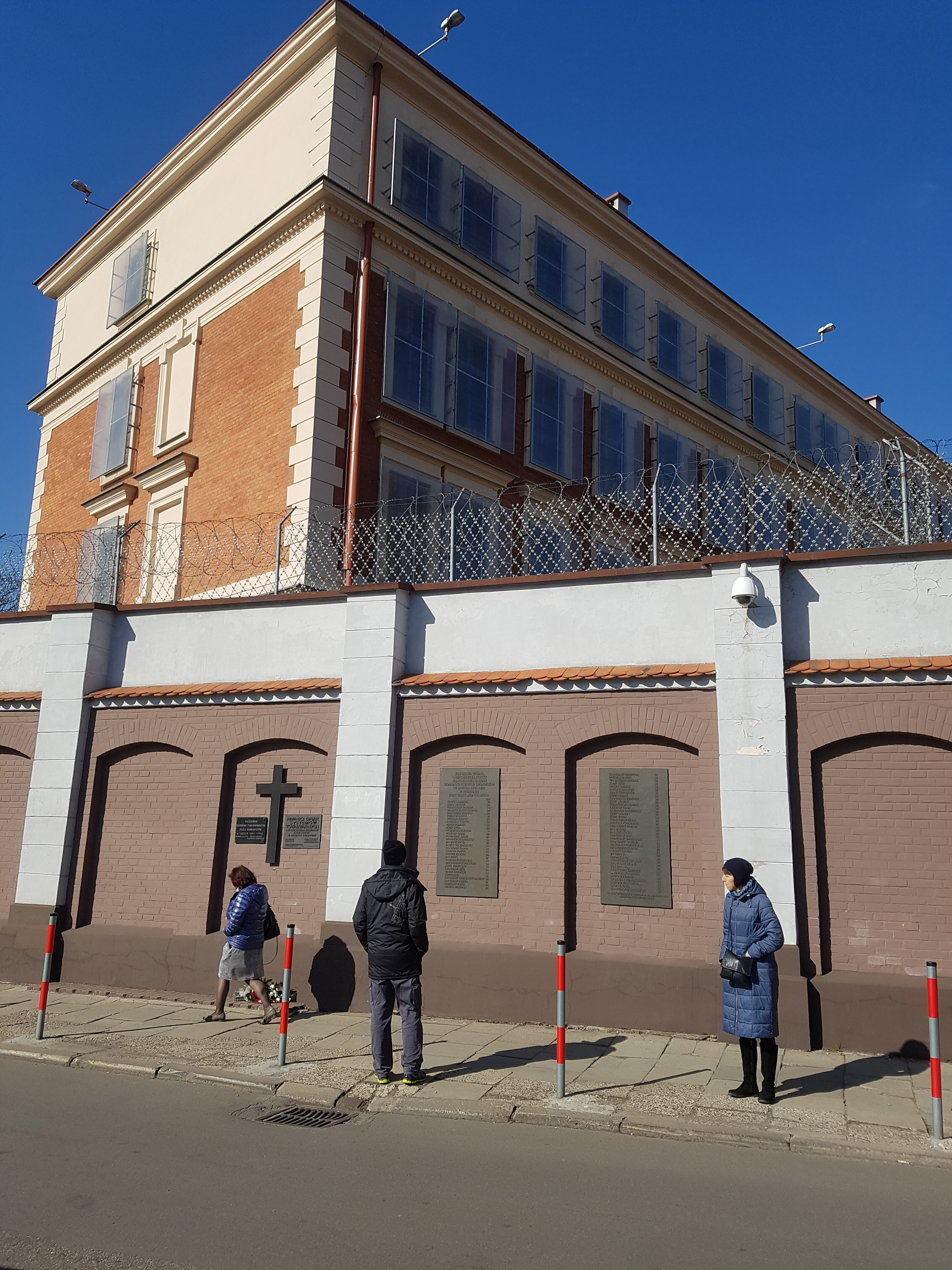
Current view of the prison

The building housing the prison was not originally constructed for its purpose, but instead was a historical property that was redecorated in the Italianate Renaissance style in 1556 by the Italian Montelupi family, who introduced the first postal service in Poland for the court of Sigismund III Vasa. Their Kraków manor house, known in Polish as the Kamienica Montelupich (Palazzo Montelupi in Italian), at Number 7 of the street to which it gave the name, was the starting point of the first international postal coach in Poland which departed from here for Venice in 1558. The Jalu Kurek Park in Kraków was formerly the palace garden of the Palazzo Montelupi.

== Current status ==
The Montelupich Prison was the site of the last execution in Poland before the death penalty was abolished: the hanging of Stanisław Czabański, who had been convicted of raping and murdering a woman, on 21 April 1988.

Despite being officially recognized as both a historical monument and a place of martyrdom, the facility continues to be operated to this day as a combination of remand prison and ordinary correctional facility by the Polish Prison Administration (Służba Więzienna), a unit of the Polish Justice Ministry. Its current official name is Areszt Śledczy w Krakowie. The infamous history of this facility continues to the present day, as evident in the 2008 death of the Romanian detainee, Claudiu Crulic (1975–2008), an incident condemned by human rights groups (such as the Human Rights House Foundation of Oslo, Norway) and which occasioned the resignation of the Romanian Foreign Affairs Minister, Adrian Cioroianu.

Vincent A. Lapomarda writes in his book on the Nazi terror that:

On inquiring about Montelupich, on Montelupi Street, when I was in Kraków on 18 August 1986, I was able to view it from outside and learned that even today, while still operating, it has not lost the evil reputation that it had during the Nazi occupation.

== Notable inmates ==
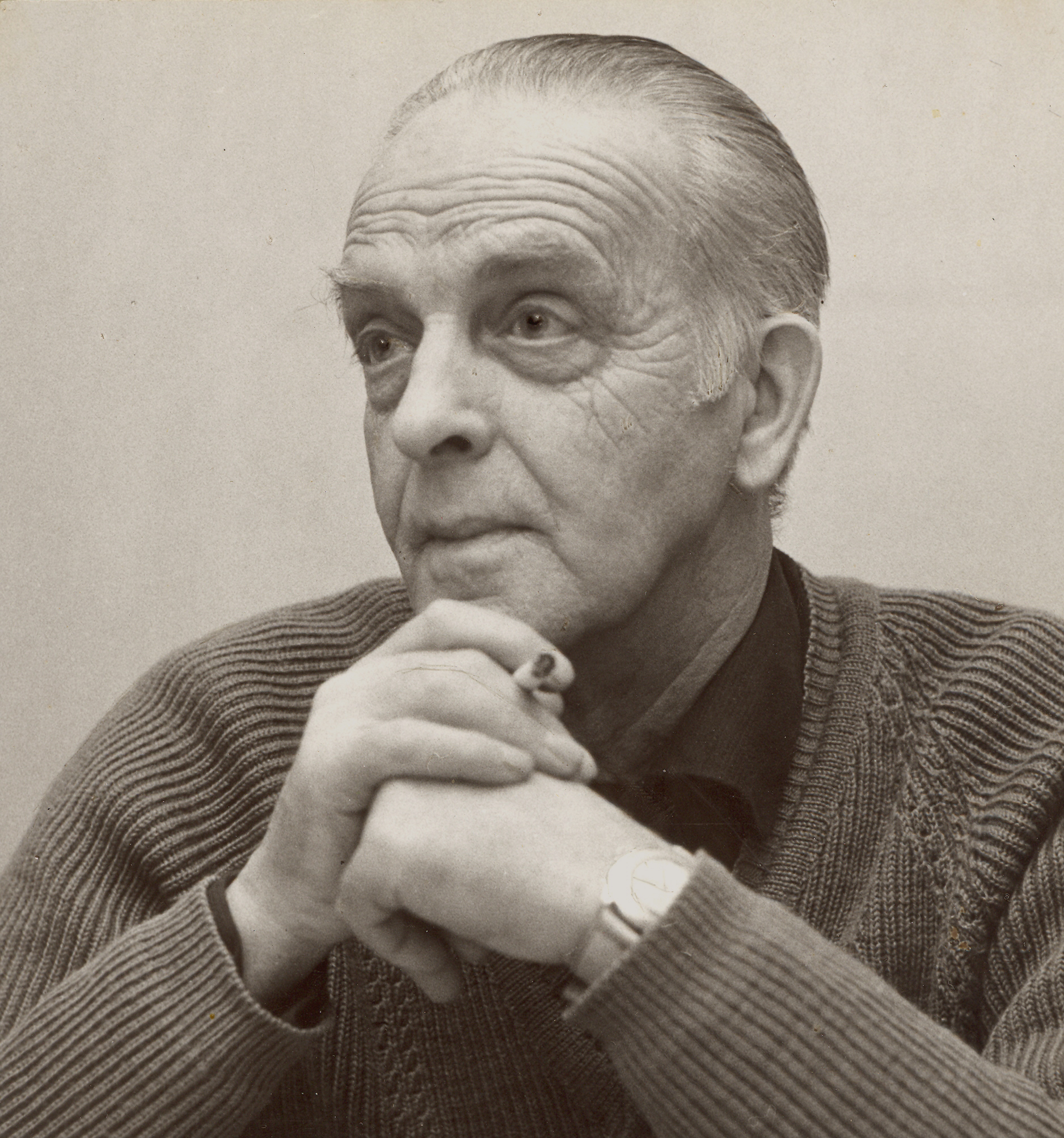
W. L. Frydrych, painter prisoner in 1944

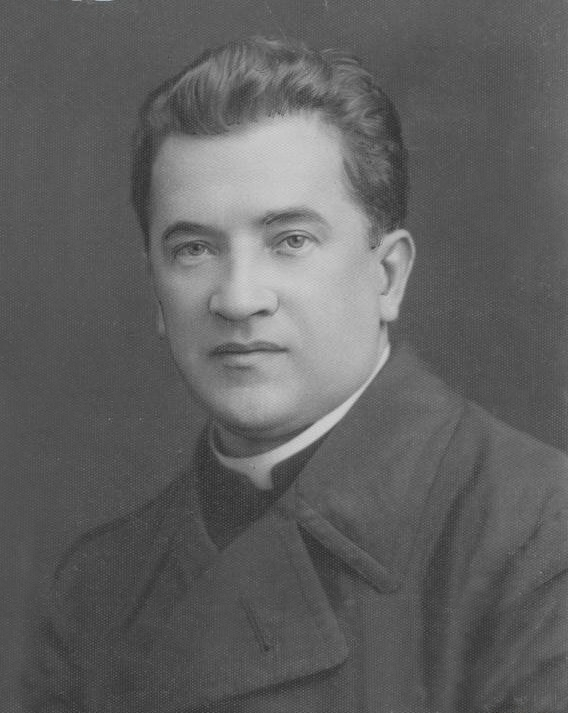
Wilhelm Gaczek, O.S.A., Catholic priest, prisoner in 1941

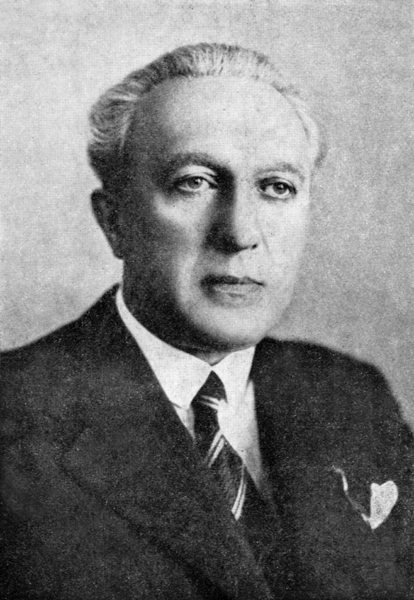
Z. Jachimecki, composer prisoner in 1939

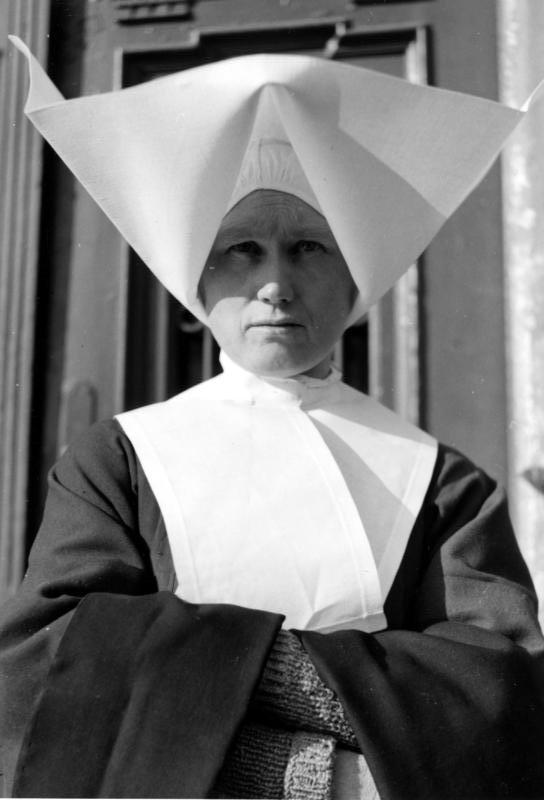
Unidentified nun prisoner in 1939 (German Federal Archives)

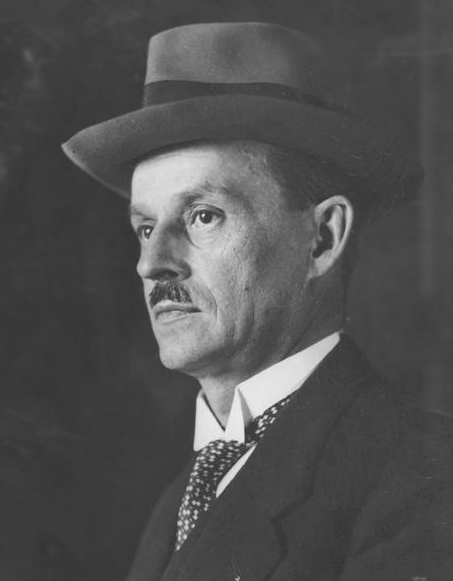
Stanisław Klimecki president of Kraków prisoner in 1939 and 1942 (three times)

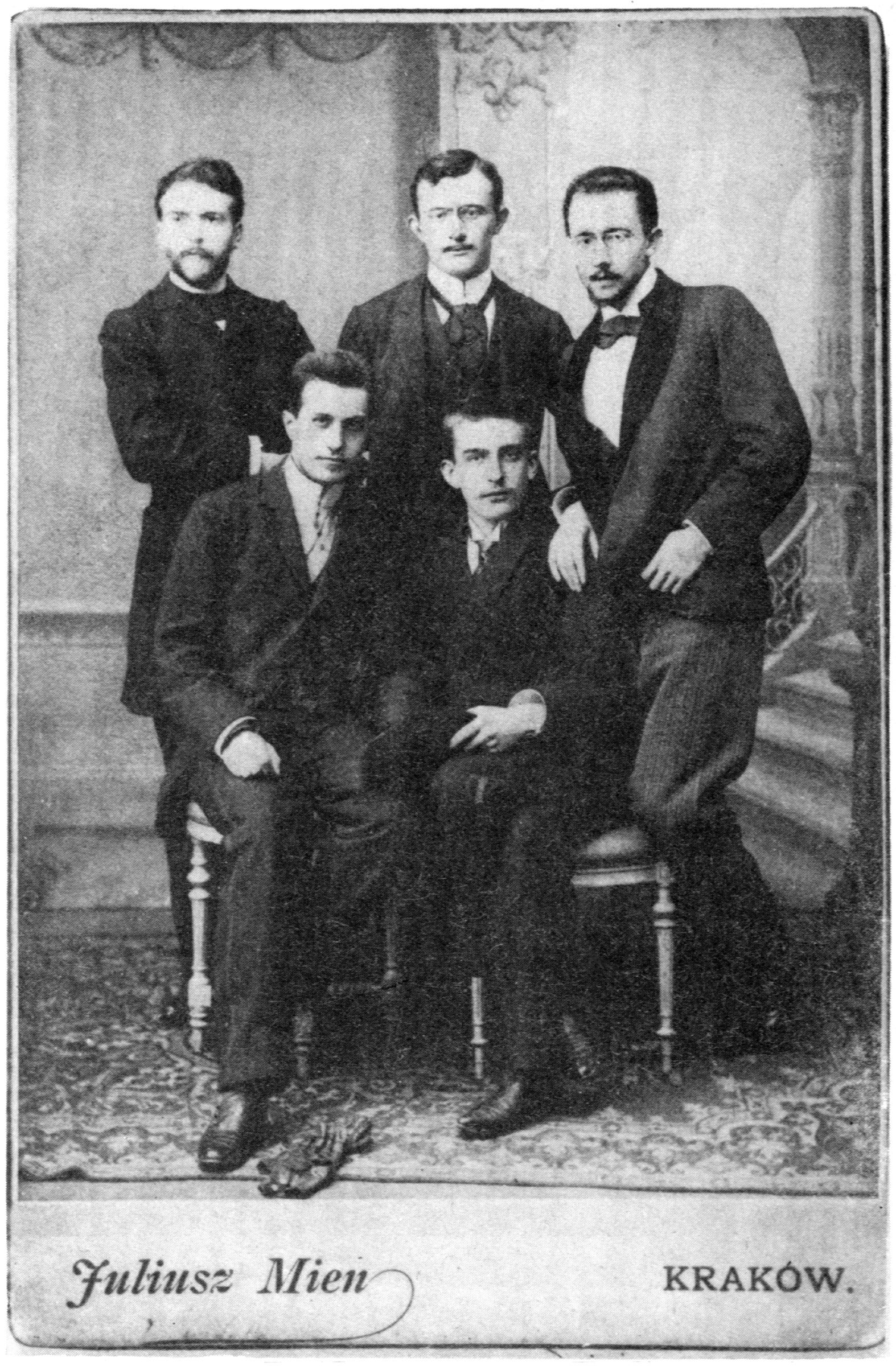
Stanisław Estreicher (seated on the right) prisoner in 1939

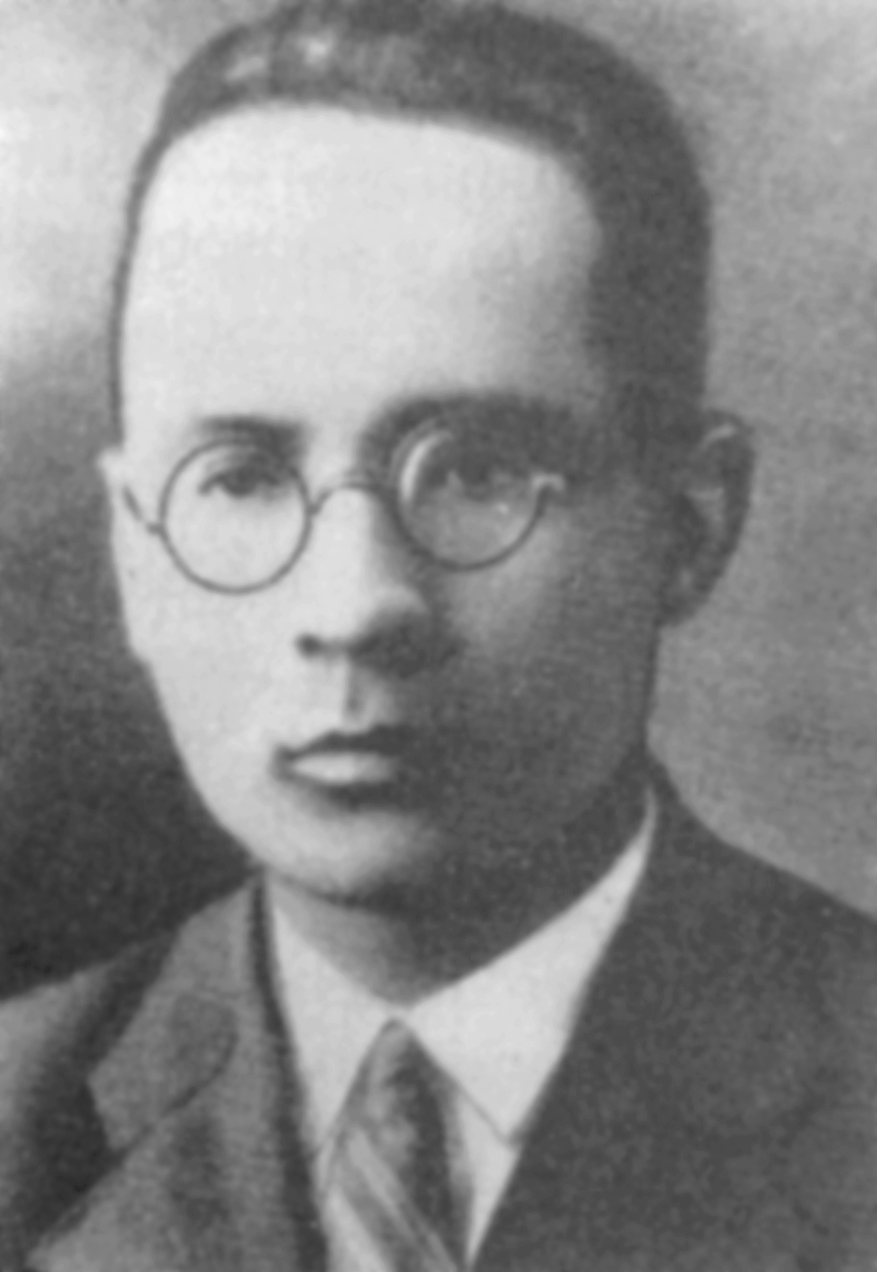
Ignacy Fik, poet & critic executed in 1942

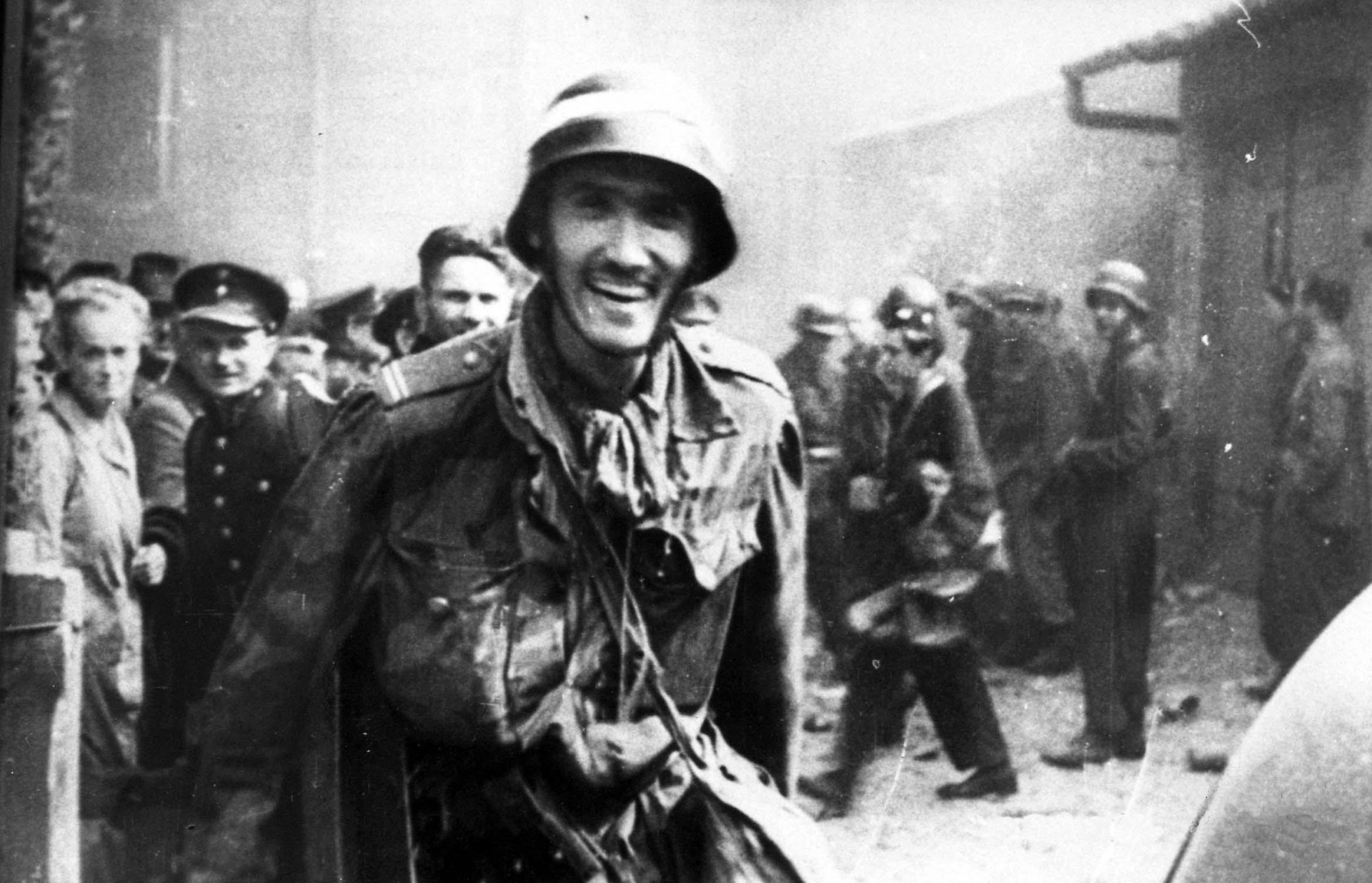
Witold Kieżun, economist prisoner in 1945

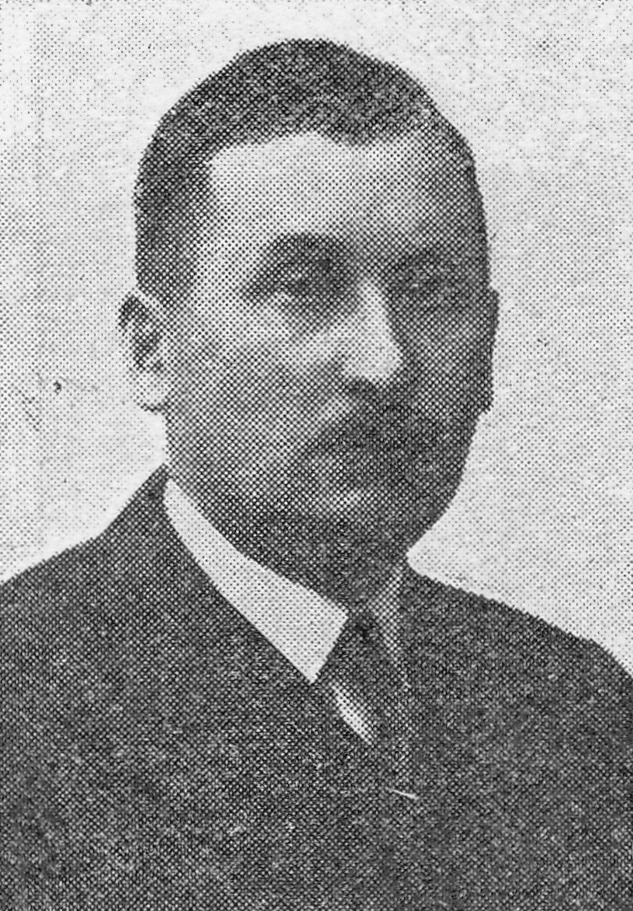
Edward Kleszczyński, senator prisoner in 1942

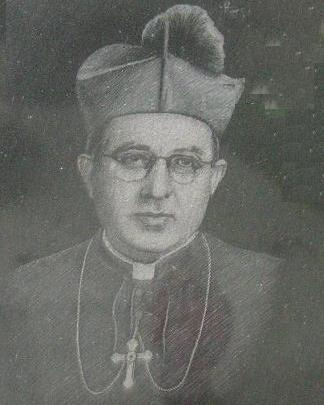
Józef Padewski, bishop prisoner in 1942

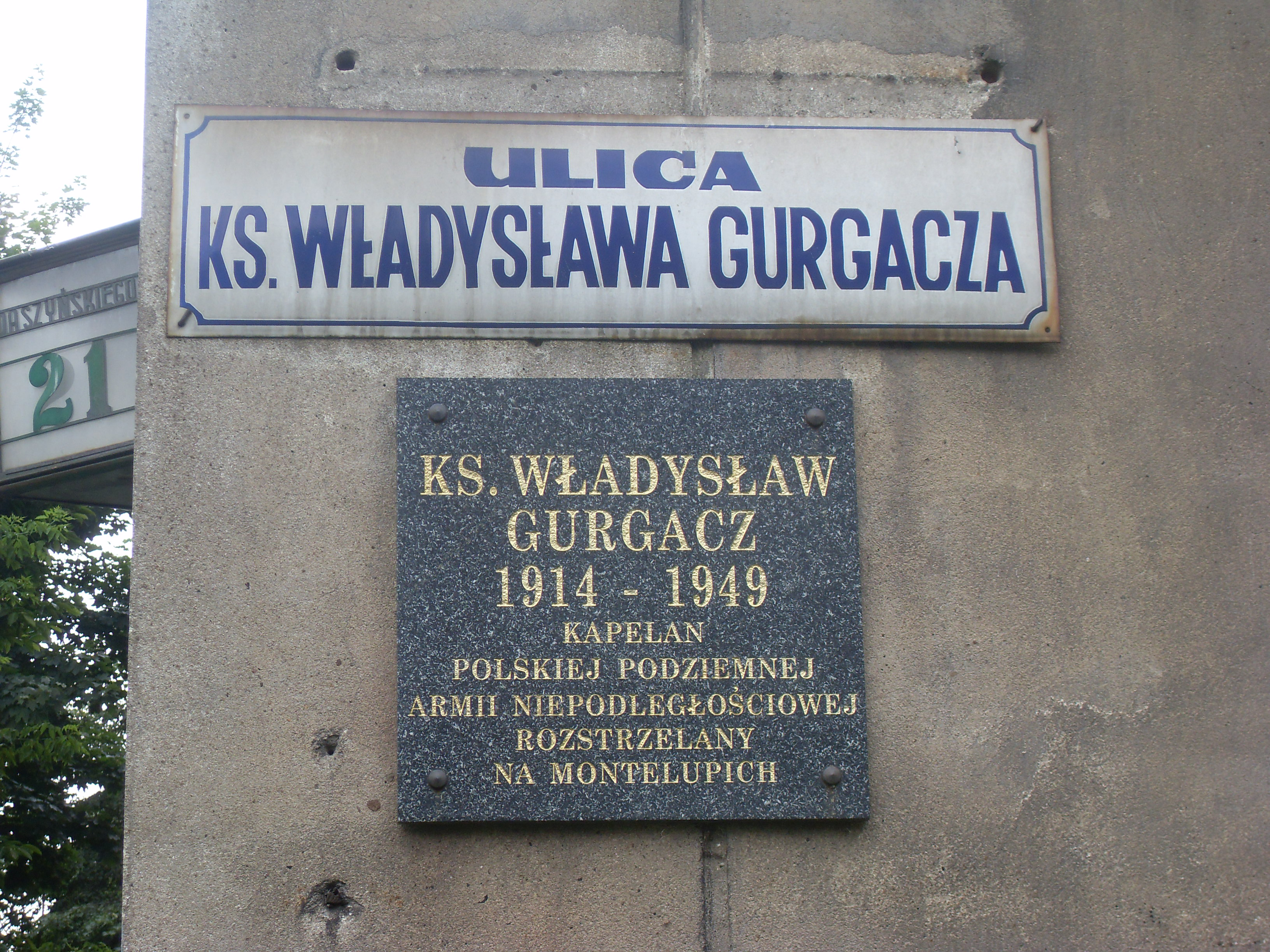
Władysław Gurgacz clergyman executed in 1949

- Józef Archutowski (1879–1944; professor of theology, long-term Dean of the Theology Department of the Jagiellonian University; victim of Sonderaktion Krakau)
- Teodor Augustyn (1895–1963; veteran of Silesian Uprisings in 1919–1921, tracked down by the Nazis in 1940 and incarcerated at Montelupich before being deported to Auschwitz)
- Karol Bacz (1900–1984; decorated Polish veteran of the Polish–Soviet War and Nazi invasion of Poland; incarcerated at Montelupich 1939–1940 as a result of a łapanka)
- Józef Badura (1903–1943; Polish educator and social activist in Cieszyn Silesia; incarcerated by the Gestapo in 1942, he was executed by firearm at Montelupich in 1943)
- Maksymilian Basista (1883–1967; founder and editor-in-chief of several newspapers in Rybnik, a city for which he served as vice-mayor: included in the Sonderfahndungsbuch Polen, a listing – prepared by the Nazis before the war – of people to be eliminated as the first priority after the Nazi invasion of Poland)
- Marian Batko (1901–1941; educator, incarcerated in 1941, subsequently deported to Auschwitz where he volunteered to die in exchange for another prisoner condemned to death, saving the other's life; decorated posthumously with the Golden Cross of the Order of Virtuti Militari, the country's highest decoration for heroism in time of war)
- Henryk Batowski (1907–1999; historian, professor in Jagiellonian University; son of the painter Stanisław Kaczor-Batowski; author of nearly 100 books, including Greckie rewolucje ("Greek Revolutions"; 1935), and Europa zmierza ku przepaści ("Europe is Heading for an Abyss", 1977); victim of Sonderaktion Krakau, eventually released by the Nazis owing to the personal intervention in Ivo Andrić, a future Nobel Prize winner in Literature, who served at the time as the Kingdom of Yugoslavia's ambassador to Germany)
- Janina Bednarska (née Dubińska, 1912–1941; wife of Prof. Stefan Bednarski (see below), after arrest of husband made efforts to obtain his release, continuing her efforts on behalf of other victims of Sonderaktion Krakau even after having received the news of her husband's death at Sachsenhausen concentration camp; subsequently joined the underground Union of Armed Struggle; incarcerated at Montelupich, she was executed by firearm off-premises)
- Stanisław Bednarski (1896–1942; professor of art history and publisher; incarcerated at Montelupich from 8 July 1940; beatification in process (ecclesiastical title: "Servant of God"))
- Stefan Bednarski (1868–1940; husband of Janina Bednarska (née Dubińska; see above); professor of Russian language in Jagiellonian University, victim of Sonderaktion Krakau; deported from Montelupich to Sachsenhausen where he died (of pneumonia) on 1 January 1940)
- Władysław Błądziński (1908–1944; Polish clergyman and educator in Secret Universities; incarcerated at Montelupich from 25 April 1944, subsequently deported to Gross-Rosen where he secretly ministered to the prisoners; was murdered by being pushed off a precipice in the stone quarry by an SS-man; one of the so-called "108 Martyrs of World War II" beatified by Pope John Paul II on 13 June 1999 (ecclesiastical title: "Venerable"))
- Andrzej Bolewski (1906–2002; mineralogist and petrographer, professor in Jagiellonian University; victim of Sonderaktion Krakau; released by the Nazis as a result of a collective intervention by Italian and Spanish scholars)
- Władysław Boziewicz (1886–1946; captain in the army of the Second Polish Republic, author of Polski Kodeks Honorowy (Polish Code of Honour); incarcerated at Montelupich for aiding partisans during the war)
- Józef Cyrek (1904–1940; Polish writer and magazine editor; incarcerated at Montelupich just 70 days after the outbreak of the war on 10 November 1939, he was murdered at Auschwitz less than ten months later; beatification in process (ecclesiastical title: "Servant of God"))
- Stanisław Czabański (1959–1988; a Polish assailant and murderer, and the last person to ever be judicially executed by Poland; his execution on 21 April 1988 took place at the Montelupich Prison gallows (used for civilian crimes by that time); a moratorium on executions was instated in 1989, and capital punishment was abolished in Poland in 1997)
- Michał Czajczyk (1915–1945; champion basketball player; incarcerated at Montelupich in December 1944, he was murdered at the Flossenbürg concentration camp in the last days of the war in April 1945)
- Gusta Davidson Draenger (properly Gusta Dawidsohn-Draengerowa, also known as Justyna; 1917–1943; author of Pamiętnik Justyny (Justyna's Narrative), written during the author's lengthy imprisonment at Montelupich, from which she escaped.
- Stanisław Dąbrowa-Kostka (b. 1924; soldier of the Armia Krajowa and writer; victim of post-War repressions by the Communist regime of Poland, incarcerated at Montelupich during the period 1946–1949; author of six books, including W okupowanym Krakowie: 6 IX 1939–18 I 1945 ("In Nazi-occupied Kraków"; 1972), and Rysunki więzienne 1946–1949 Stanisława Dąbrowy-Kostki: katalog wystawy: grudzień 2003 ("Drawings from Prison, 1946–1949", published in the period of the Third Republic in 2003))
- Kazimierz Dembowski (1912–1942; Polish clergyman, a Jesuit; a magazine and book editor working for a religious publishing house; arrested by Gestapo just seventy days after Nazi invasion of Poland; beatification in process (ecclesiastical title: "Servant of God"))
- Ignacy Dobiasz (1880–1941; Polish clergyman, member of the religious institute of the Salesians of Don Bosco; educator, professor of moral theology; incarcerated at Montelupich on 23 May 1941: on 26 June 1941 deported to Auschwitz where he perished the next day (strangled by a kapo in the gravel yard); beatification in process (ecclesiastical title: "Servant of God")
- Judith Strick Dribben (1923–1977; Polish-born Israeli writer, author of the book A Girl Called Judith Strick; a Holocaust survivor, she was a resistance fighter in Lvov. Obliged to seek cover, she took up a job as a maid, only to be denounced by her employer after she stole his German police uniform.
- Tadeusz Henryk Dziedzicki (1892–1945; agricultural engineer, veteran of the September Campaign; a double victim of both Nazi and post-War Communist repressions: arrested twice by the Nazis (prison time in Miechów), then immediately after "liberation" arrested by NKVD together with other Armia Krajowa members and incarcerated at Montelupich, later to be deported to a Soviet gulag in Krasnovodsk in Soviet Turkmenistan where he died)
- Frances Ehrlich Safe (American-born wife of Ludwik Ehrlich (1889–1968), the famous Polish jurist; imprisoned by the Nazis at Montelupich for over a year during the Second World War, this is the only known case of such long-term imprisonment at Montelupich of a person being a citizen of the United States at the time of imprisonment (having married Ludwik Ehrlich at St. Patrick's Cathedral in New York, she never subsequently adopted Polish citizenship, dying at the age of 93 as an American citizen))
- Stanisław Estreicher (1869–1939; historian of law and bibliographer of Polish literature, professor and rector (1919–1921) of Jagiellonian University; imprisoned at Montelupich, Wrocław, and Sachsenhausen in Sonderaktion Krakau; he fell ill already during transport to Sachsenhausen, died in camp on 29 December 1939, just 53 days after arrest)
- Ignacy Fik (1904–1942; Polish poet, one of the most renowned literary critics of the Interbellum period; arrested by Gestapo in October 1942 and interrogated under torture at Montelupich, he was executed at Montelupich (or, according to some sources, at an execution site off-premises) by firing squad on 26 November 1942)
- Władysław Findysz (1907–1964; Polish clergyman; victim of post-War repressions by the Communist régime of Poland; arrested in Rzeszów in November 1963 on the charge of engaging in Christian ministry, was given a show trial in December 1963 in the course of which was convicted and sentenced to 2½ years' imprisonment; after 2 months in Rzeszów Castle (a post-NKVD prison), was transferred in January 1964 to Montelupich for "special treatment", as a result of which his health was broken; released "conditionally" on 29 February 1964 in a state of total exhaustion, he returned to his native parts only to die a little later; beatified by Pope Benedict XVI in 2005 – the first Polish person to be beatified as a martyr of Communism (ecclesiastical title: "Venerable"))
- Stanisław Frączysty (1917–2009; legendary courier of the Armia Krajowa, 1940–1942; in October 1941 personally guided Marshal Edward Rydz-Śmigły, the Commander-in-Chief of Polish Armed Forces, on his secret passage from Budapest in Hungary to occupied Warsaw; arrested by Gestapo in February 1942 he was first incarcerated in the Hotel Palace in Zakopane, the other infamous Gestapo torture site in Poland, and later transferred to Montelupich: he was subsequently deported to Auschwitz and Dachau for the remainder of the War; after the War, in 1949, arrested again by Polish Communist régime on fake charges of espionage, he was eventually released without having been brought to trial; on 28 May 2006 he met with Pope Benedict XVI at Auschwitz).
- Władysław Leopold Frydrych (1900–1972; Polish painter, educator in Secret Universities during the war, an activity for which he was incarcerated at Montelupich in 1944)
- Wilhelm Gaczek, O.S.A. (1881–1941; Polish Catholic priest, social activist and patron of numerous cultural organizations; incarcerated at Montelupich by Gestapo in 1941 on charges of possession of underground publications and listening to the radio, was deported on 4 November 1941 to Auschwitz where he was murdered ten days later)
- Tadeusz Gajda (1924–1946; independence fighter, nom de guerre Tarzan, member of the Armia Krajowa and National Military Union, a staunchly anticommunist organization; victim of post-War repressions by the Communist régime of Poland; arrested on 8 August 1946, he was given a show trial in Tarnów, condemned to death, brought to Kraków and executed at Montelupich on 14 October 1946 at the age of 22; fully rehabilitated after the collapse of Communism, on 8 November 1991)
- Adolf Gawalewicz (1916–1987; Polish jurist and writer, author of Refleksje z poczekalni do gazu: ze wspomnień muzułmana ("Reflections in the Gas Chamber's Waiting Room: Memoirs of a Muselmann"; 1968), his only non-specialist book written for the general public; incarcerated at Montelupich 16 September 1940 – 9 January 1941 for participation in the Resistance and possession of underground publications, subsequently deported to Auschwitz; after the war was a material witness in the Frankfurt Auschwitz Trials)
- Antoni Gaweł (1901–1989; Polish geologist, mineralogist, and petrographer, professor in Jagiellonian University, victim of Sonderaktion Krakau incarcerated at Montelupich, Oranienburg, and Dachau; released in January 1941)
- Stanisław Gawęda (1914–1994; Polish historian, professor in Jagiellonian University, veteran of the September Campaign and member of several underground Resistance organizations; double victim of both Nazi and post-War Communist repressions; active as educator in Secret Universities from 1941, he was arrested in December 1944 and imprisoned at Montelupich for the remainder of the war; after the War he was subject to surveillance by the special services of the Communist régime and obliged to go into hiding for a time)
- Izydor Gąsienica-Łuszczek (1912–1992; champion skier, 1933; ran a ski-repair shop in the Polish ski resort of Zakopane, which during the war became a clandestine contact point for persons fleeing from the Nazis; arrested by Gestapo on 23 February 1940, was tortured at Hotel Palace and in Nowotarska Prison in Zakopane before being transferred to Montelupich whence on 20 June 1940 was deported to Auschwitz, and subsequently to Sachsenhausen-Oranienburg; freed by American forces at Schwerin on 2 May 1945)
- Zuzanna Ginczanka (1917–1945; renowned poet, star of the literary life of Warsaw before the war; arrested for being Jewish by the Gestapo in Kraków in 1944, she was incarcerated at Montelupich where she was tortured by being dragged across the floor of the interrogation room by the hair; subsequently transferred to Czarnieckiego Prison in Kraków where she was executed by firearm possibly on 17 January 1945)
- Adam Gondek (1913–1987; non-commissioned officer of the Army of the Second Polish Republic, during the war member of the Armia Krajowa, distinguished by participation in the action of transfer of components of Nazi V-2 rocket to the United Kingdom; victim of post-War repressions by the Communist régime of Poland, incarcerated at Montelupich in 1947 as a former soldier of the Armia Krajowa)
- Władysław Gurgacz (1914–1949; Polish clergyman, a Jesuit priest; victim of post-War repressions by the Communist régime of Poland; was chaplain to the underground anticommunist Polska Podziemna Armia Niepodległościowców (Underground Polish Army of Fighters for Independence); imprisoned at Montelupich in the summer of 1949, after a summary show trial executed by firearm at Montelupich on 14 September 1949; rehabilitated after the collapse of Communism (conviction invalidated on 20 February 1992), has a street named after himself in Kraków; posthumously (on 14 June 2008) awarded the Commander's Cross of the Order of Polonia Restituta, one of the country's highest honours, by the President of Poland, Lech Kaczyński)
- Kazimierz Guzik (1911–1970; geologist, professor in Jagiellonian University, prolific writer in his field; arrested by Gestapo in February 1943 as a resistance fighter, his places of detention included, in addition to Montelupich, Nowy Sącz, Auschwitz, Gross-Rosen, and Litoměřice)
- Stefania Hanausek (1915–1941; soldier of the Union of Armed Struggle, veteran of the September Campaign; after September Campaign worked in the Dąbrowa Tarnowska Landkommissariat as undercover intelligence officer of the Polish underground; arrested in September 1940 by Gestapo she was imprisoned at Montelupich, where her "trial" was held in which she was condemned to death and executed at Skrzyszów; her mother was subsequently murdered for putting flowers on her grave).
- Franciszek Harazim (1885–1941; Polish clergyman, member of the religious institute of the Salesians of Don Bosco; high-school director; on 23 May 1941 imprisoned at Montelupich, whence on 26 June 1941 deported to Auschwitz: the next day strangled at Auschwitz by a kapo; his beatification is in process (ecclesiastical title: "Servant of God"))
- Pius Jabłoński (1908–1979; Polish educator active in and organizer of Secret Universities during the war; victim of multiple arrests and imprisonments by the Nazis, including torture sessions at Hotel Palace in Zakopane; victim of post-War repressions by the Communist régime of Poland: while post-War director of the high school in Nowy Targ he protested the arrests by the Communists of his students who were connected to Armia Krajowa during the War, in consequence of which he was himself arrested and on 1 November 1946 imprisoned at Montelupich, not to be released until 26 June 1947; he was rehabilitated after the death of Stalin in 1957 and subsequently awarded the Golden Cross of Merit in 1969 and the Commander's Cross of the Order of Polonia Restituta in 1974, in addition to other honours)
- Michał Jachimczak (1908–1941; Polish clergyman, member of the Congregation of the Mission; imprisoned at Montelupich by the Nazis 15 July – 30 August 1940, he was subjected to multiple forms of torture; subsequently deported to Auschwitz (for 104 days), and to Dachau where he was murdered in the camp hospital on 30 January 1941 by lethal injection; his beatification is in process (ecclesiastical title: "Servant of God"))
- Zdzisław Jachimecki (1882–1953; Polish composer, biographer of Chopin, professor in Jagiellonian University; imprisoned at Montelupich, Wrocław, and Sachsenhausen as a result of Sonderaktion Krakau; released in March 1940)
- Roman Jagiełło-Yagel (1921–2016); Polish-born successively Soviet, Polish, and Israeli military man (in that order); born in Bircza (or, alternatively, in Żurawica), after the Soviet invasion of Poland he joined the Red Army, and in that capacity became a prisoner of war held by the Nazis after the Operation Barbarossa, eventually managing to flee from captivity; after falling out with the Soviets because of his Jewish identity, he joined Soviet-organized Polish forces (1st Tadeusz Kościuszko Infantry Division) in whose ranks he rose to the rank of podporucznik; after the War supported Jewish emigration from Poland to Palestine, and perhaps for this reason was imprisoned at Montelupich over a period of nine months; in 1957 emigrated to Israel where he achieved high distinction in the Israeli police forces (rising to the rank of Brigadier General, or Tat Aluf))
- Maciej Jakubowicz (1911–1979; Polish social activist, veteran of the September Campaign; imprisoned by the Nazis at Montelupich, Wiśnicz, and several concentration camps, he was also the victim of post-War repressions by the Communist régime of Poland as a consequence of the antisemitic policies adopted after the 1968 events; acquaintance of Pope John Paul II, he shared the place of birth with the Pontiff)
- Edward Janton (1911–1979; Polish printer, member of the Armia Krajowa; during the war participated in underground action of sabotaging the publication of Nazi propaganda newspapers in the Polish language at the behest of the Polish government-in-exile's representative for Homeland; arrested by the Nazis on the night of 1–2 July 1944, he was imprisoned at Montelupich before being deported to the Płaszów concentration camp and later transferred to Gross-Rosen and Mittelbau-Dora where he was rescued by American forces on 15 April 1945)
- Hilary Paweł Januszewski (1907–1945; Polish clergyman, a theologian educated at the Angelicum in Rome, professor of Church history and systematics; arrested by the Nazis 18 September 1940 he was imprisoned at Montelupich, and subsequently at Sachsenhausen and (from April 1941) at Dachau where he volunteered to minister in the camp hospital to patients infected with typhus, as a result becoming infected himself and dying there four days before the liberation of the camp; one of the so-called "108 Martyrs of World War II" beatified by Pope John Paul II on 13 June 1999 (ecclesiastical title: "Venerable"))
- Adam Franciszek Jaźwiecki (1900–1946; Polish painter, graphic artist, and draughtsman, member of the Kraków Group ; veteran of the Polish Legions in World War I; after Nazi invasion of Poland was impressed into forced-labour formations, which he used as an opportunity to facilitate escapes of people arrested by the Nazis; denounced by an unknown Nazi informant, he was arrested in the second half of 1942 and imprisoned at Montelupich, whence on 1 December 1942 deported to Auschwitz, later transferred to Gross-Rosen, Oranienburg, and Halberstadt (a subcamp of Dachau); after the liberation he returned to Kraków; after his death in 1946, 113 of his paintings from the concentration camps were donated to the Auschwitz-Birkenau State Museum)
- Jan Jędrykowski (1899–1942; Polish clergyman, member of the Congregation of the Mission; arrested by Gestapo on 15 July 1940, he was imprisoned at Montelupich until 30 August when he was deported to Auschwitz and later to Dachau where he was murdered in a gas chamber on 6 May 1942; his beatification is in process (ecclesiastical title: "Servant of God").
- Witold Kacz (1920–1981; Polish clergyman and catechist; victim of post-War repressions by the Communist régime of Poland; he received holy orders during the war at the hands of Cardinal Sapieha; after the War he was one of the regional leaders of the anticommunist organization Młodzież Wielkiej Polski (founded back in 1932), a youth chapter of the Stronnictwo Narodowe (a political party), and worked as a chaplain to the Armia Krajowa; arrested on 7 July 1950 and imprisoned December 1950 – May 1951 at Montelupich, where he was sentenced to 15-years' imprisonment; released in 1953 "on health grounds"; founded a religious institute for lay people in 1960)
- Alojzy Kaczmarczyk (1896–1947; officer of the Army and subsequently member of the regional administration of the Second Polish Republic; victim of post-War repressions by the Communist régime of Poland; after the Nazi invasion of Poland was arrested by the Germans in 1939 and imprisoned at Lublin Castle until January 1940; after his release joined the Armia Krajowa, and after the Warsaw Uprising was arrested again and deported to Gross-Rosen and to Mauthausen-Gusen where he spent the rest of the War; arrested by the Communists in September 1946 as a member of the anticommunist organization Freedom and Independence he was imprisoned at Montelupich where he was executed by firearm on 13 November 1947 (his body hasn't been released to the family); rehabilitated after the collapse of Communism (conviction invalidated by Warsaw military court on 17 January 1992), he was decorated with the Silver Cross of the Order of Virtuti Militari, in addition to other honours, and with a monument in 2007)
- Władysław Karaś (1893–1942; veteran of the First World War (Polish Legions), officer of the Army of the Second Polish Republic (military intelligence), winner in the 1936 Olympics of the first Polish Olympic medal in the 50-metre rifle three-position event (at the age of 43); after Nazi invasion of Poland performed high functions within the Resistance, arrested by the Nazis in late autumn of 1940 he was imprisoned at Montelupich for about two months; on 23 April 1942 arrested again and executed by a firing squad on 28 May 1942 at Magdalenka; multiple military decorations)
- Witold Kieżun (1922–2021; Polish economist, representative of the Polish School of Praxeology; after the Nazi invasion of Poland active member of the Resistance with distinguished service, decorated in 1944 with both the Cross of Valour and the Order of Virtuti Militari; victim of post-War repressions by the Communist régime of Poland; in March 1945 arrested by NKVD as a member of the Armia Krajowa and imprisoned at Montelupich whence on 23 May 1945 he was deported by the Soviets to a Soviet gulag in Krasnovodsk in Soviet Turkmenistan (where he contracted beriberi): after release by the Soviets in 1946 as a result of a general amnesty, further imprisoned for a time by Polish Communists; professor in Temple University, the Université de Montréal, and other universities.)
- Edward Kleszczyński (1892–1984; Sejm member and senator of the Second Polish Republic, veteran of the First World War (Polish Legions), imprisoned in 1917 in the Oath crisis; officer in the Army of the Second Polish Republic, during the Second World War member of the Armia Krajowa; arrested by the Nazis in 1942 he was imprisoned at Montelupich for six months before being transferred to a Warsaw prison whence he was bought out; multiple military decorations; after the war was a man wanted by the Communists; died in New York City on 20 January 1984)
- Stanisław Klimecki (1883–1942; Polish jurist and social activist, president (mayor) of Kraków; three- to five-time prisoner of Montelupich in 1939 and 1942; murdered by the Nazis on 11 December 1942)
- Norbert Kompalla (1907–1942; Polish clergyman, member of the Congregation of the Mission, professor of moral theology, canon law, Church history, and patristics; after the Nazi invasion of Poland arrested by Gestapo on 15 July 1940, he was imprisoned at Montelupich until 30 August when he was deported to Auschwitz and later (on 12 December 1940) to Dachau where he was murdered in a gas chamber on 1 December 1942; his beatification is in process (ecclesiastical title: "Servant of God"))
- Jan Komski (1915–2002; Polish painter; active in the Resistance during the War, was arrested by the Nazis several times, author of a famous escape from Auschwitz, imprisoned at Montelupich from January to October 1943)
- Władysław Konopczyński
- Józef Kowalski (Polish clergyman; one of the so-called "108 Martyrs of World War II" beatified by Pope John Paul II on 13 June 1999 (ecclesiastical title: "Venerable"))
- Tadeusz Jan Kowalski
- Paweł Kubisz (Polish poet)
- Marek Kubliński (1931–1950; Kraków high-school student and Boy Scout, fighter against the Communist régime of post-War Poland; captured in April 1950 at the age of 18, incarcerated at Montelupich; in a show trial held in June 1950 he received four death sentences; executed by firearm at Montelupich on 4 October 1950 at the age of 19; nowadays has two streets named after himself, one in Kraków, and one in Skawina)
- Stanisław Kutrzeba
- Tadeusz Lehr-Spławiński
- Mieczysław Lewiński (1905–1942; Polish political activist (teacher by profession), during the war founder of the underground organization Polska Ludowa; co-founder of the Polska Partia Robotnicza; arrested by Gestapo on 22 October 1942 and imprisoned at Montelupich, he was tortured to death on 3 November 1942 after 12 days in custody)
- Tadeusz Litawiński (art collector; double victim of both Nazi and post-War Communist repressions)
- Stanisław Lubomirski (b. 1931; Polish prince; incarcerated at Montelupich by the Nazis for running a pharmacy for the benefit of wounded Armia Krajowa soldiers)
- Ferdynand Machay (the Younger)
- Franciszek Malinowski
- Stanisław Marusarz
- Helena Marusarzówna (champion skier and Armia Krajowa soldier)
- Henryk Mianowski (Polish politician and engineering professor)
- Józef Mika (victim of post-War repressions by the Communist régime of Poland)
- Józefina Mika (1897–1942; Polish educator and social activist; murdered by the Nazis at Montelupich Prison)
- Gola Mire (1911–1943) Polish Jewish resistance activist; killed attempting to escape from Montelupich Prison
- Marian Morawski (d. 1940)
- Ludwik Mroczek (Polish clergyman; beatification in process (ecclesiastical title: "Servant of God"))
- Franciszek Mróz (victim of post-War repressions by the Communist régime of Poland)
- Antoni Mruk (writer on canon law and confessor to Pope John Paul II)
- Piotr Oborski (victim of post-War repressions by the Communist régime of Poland)
- Józef Padewski (bishop of the Polish National Catholic Church)
- Jan Piwowarczyk (1889–1959; Polish clergyman; war-time rector of the Seminary of the Kraków Archdiocese (Wyższe Seminarium Duchowne Archidiecezji Krakowskiej), imprisoned at Montelupich 27 October 1942 – 8 January 1943; author of Montelupich memoirs, "W hitlerowskim więzieniu" (In a Hitlerite Prison), published posthumously in Tygodnik Powszechny, a periodical he founded and edited during his lifetime)
- Franciszek Postawka (victim of post-War repressions by the Communist régime of Poland)
- Stefan Schwarz (Polish gynecologist)
- Michał Marian Siedlecki
- Mieczysław Słaby (a double victim of both Nazi and post-War Communist repressions)
- Józef Słupina (Polish clergyman; beatification in process (ecclesiastical title: "Servant of God"))
- Marian Sołtysiak (commander in the Armia Krajowa; veteran of the Nazi invasion of Poland; victim of post-War repressions by the Communist régime of Poland)
- Frank Stiffel (1916–2011; American writer, author of several Holocaust memoirs; Holocaust survivor, he was imprisoned at Montelupich (according to his book The Tale of the Ring: A Kaddish) as well as the Warsaw Ghetto, Treblinka, and Auschwitz.
- Aleksander Studniarski (victim of post-War repressions by the Communist régime of Poland)
- Zbigniew Szkarłat (1944–1986; Solidarity activist and social activist who organized assistance to political prisoners of the Communist régime of Poland; arrested by the Communists and imprisoned at Montelupich 13 June–27 July 1984; released because of a general amnesty, he was assaulted in a street by "persons unknown" and died in a hospital on 5 February 1986 without having regained consciousness, the case of his murder having been investigated by the same prosecutor that imprisoned him at Montelupich)
- Stanisław Szwed
- Jan Świerc (Polish clergyman; beatification in process (ecclesiastical title: "Servant of God"))
- Jerzy Tabeau
- Walerian Tumanowicz (victim of post-War repressions by the Communist régime of Poland)
- Kazimierz Tymiński (1915–1989; veteran of the September Campaign and resistance fighter during World War; imprisoned at Montelupich on 15 October 1941, he was later deported to Auschwitz; a description of his Montelupich experience is to be found in his 1985 book, To Calm My Dreams, filmed in 1988)
- Jerzy Ustupski
- Józef Wieciech (victim of post-War repressions by the Communist régime of Poland)
- Walenty Winid (Polish geographer)
- Władysław Wodniecki (a high-school student; victim of neither Nazi or Communist, but of Austrian repressions)
- Kazimierz Wojciechowski (1904–1941; Polish clergyman, member of the religious institute of the Salesians of Don Bosco, educator and catechist; imprisoned by the Nazis at Montelupich on 23 May 1941 he was shown the articles he had written to give moral support to the Polish youth; deported to Auschwitz on 26 June 1941 he was beaten, kicked, and had his teeth broken with a shovel on arrival, apparently having attracted attention by his athletic and muscular build: he was murdered the next day, strangled by kapo in the gravel yard; beatification in process (ecclesiastical title: "Servant of God"))
- Dmitro Yatsiv
- Jacek Żaba (victim of post-War repressions by the Communist régime of Poland)
- Mieczysław Zub (1953–1985; serial killer who murdered four women in Silesian Voivodeship in the early 1980s)

== Nazi war criminals ==
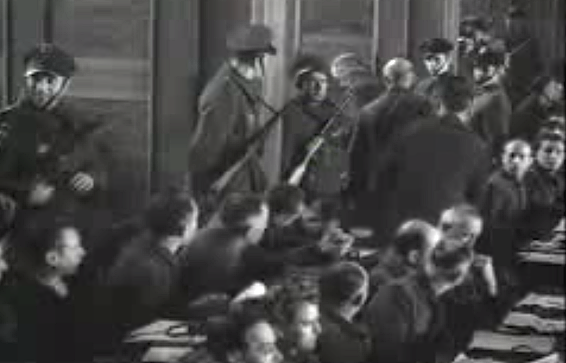
The Auschwitz trial, Kraków, November–December 1947

On 24 January 1948, twenty-one Nazi German war criminals, including two women, were hanged at the Montelupich Prison as a result of the death sentences handed down in the Auschwitz trial. Their names are listed below along with the names of the Nazi war criminals executed at Montelupich at other dates.

- Hans Aumeier
- August Bogusch
- Therese Brandl
- Josef Bühler
- Fritz Buntrock
- Wilhelm Gerhard Gehring (24 January 1948)
- Amon Göth (13 September 1946)
- Paul Götze
- Maximilian Grabner
- Willi Haase (23 May 1952)
- Heinrich Josten (24 January 1948)
- Hermann Kirschner (24 January 1948)
- Josef Kollmer
- Franz Kraus (24 January 1948)
- Otto Lätsch (24 January 1948)
- Arthur Liebehenschel
- Herbert Paul Ludwig (24 January 1948)
- Elisabeth Lupka
- Maria Mandl
- Karl Möckel
- Kurt Hugo Müller (24 January 1948)
- Erich Mußfeldt (28 January 1948)
- Ludwig Plagge
- Hans Schumacher (24 January 1948)
- Paul Szczurek (24 January 1948)

== See also ==
- Bruno Müller
- Hujowa Górka – execution site of Kraków-Płaszów concentration camp
- Mokotów Prison – Warsaw prison used by Nazi Germany
- Płaszów
- Polska Rzeczpospolita Ludowa (PRL)
- Służba Bezpieczeństwa
- Erich Dinges

== Bibliography ==
=== Eyewitness accounts ===
- Stefan Krukowski, Nad pięknym modrym Dunajem: Mauthausen, 1940–1945, Warsaw, Książka i Wiedza, 1966. (One of the most informative books about the nature of Montelupich Prison.)
- Wanda Kurkiewiczowa, Za murami Monte: wspomnienia z więzienia kobiecego Montelupich-Helclów, 1941–1942, Kraków, Wydawnictwo Literackie, 1968. (Eyewitness account of the conditions of imprisonment of female prisoners in Montelupich and their treatment at the hands of the Nazis.)
- Judith Strick Dribben, A Girl Called Judith Strick, foreword by Golda Meir, New York, Cowles Book Company, 1970. (First published as And Some Shall Live, Jerusalem, Keter Books, 1969. "Montelupich Prison was a big red brick corner building, surrounded by a high wall with barbed wire and broken glass on top.": p. 67 of the U.S. ed. See Notable inmates.)
- Antonina Piątkowska, Wspomnienia oświęcimskie, Kraków, Wydawnictwo Literackie, 1977, pages 29ff. (Another book of recollections by an inmate.)
- Frank Stiffel, The Tale of the Ring: A Kaddish: A Personal Memoir of the Holocaust, Wainscott (New York), Pushcart, 1984. ISBN 0916366219. (See Notable inmates.)
- Kazimierz Tymiński, To Calm My Dreams: Surviving Auschwitz, tr. Maria Tyminska-Marx, Chatswood (New South Wales), New Holland Publishers, 2011. ISBN 1742571085, ISBN 9781742571089. (Chapter "From Montelupich to Auschwitz". Originally published as Uspokoić sen, Katowice, Krajowa Agencja Wydawnicza, 1985. ISBN 8303012142. Filmed in 1988 as Kornblumenblau by Leszek Wosiewicz. See Notable inmates.)
- Gusta Davidson Draenger, Justyna's Narrative, ed. E. Pfefferkorn & D. H. Hirsch, tr. R. Hirsch & D. H. Hirsch, Amherst (Massachusetts), University of Massachusetts Press, 1996. ISBN 155849037X, ISBN 1558490388. (First published as: Gusta Dawidsohn-Draengerowa, Pamiętnik Justyny, ed. Joseph Wulf (1912–1974), Kraków, Centralna Żydowska Komisja Historyczna przy CK Żydów Polskich, 1946. Arguably the most extraordinary book about Montelupich ever written. See Notable inmates.)
- Barbara Pikuła-Peszkowska, Gdzie jest twój grób, Ojcze?, Bytom, Oficyna Wydawnicza 4K, 1997. ISBN 8385214313, ISBN 9788385214311.
- Stanisław Dąbrowa-Kostka, Rysunki więzienne 1946–1949 Stanisława Dąbrowy-Kostki: katalog wystawy: grudzień 2003, ed. P. M. Boroń, et al., Muzeum Armii Krajowej im. Gen. Emila Fieldorfa Nila w Krakowie, 2003. ISBN 8391514013. (Catalogue of an exhibition of "Drawings from Prison" by a former inmate. See Notable inmates.)

=== Historical studies ===
- Stanisław Czerpak and Tadeusz Wroński, Ulica Pomorska 2: o krakowskim Gestapo i jego siedzibie w latach 1939–1945, Kraków, Muzeum Historii, 1972.
- Wincenty Hein and Czesława Jakubiec, Montelupich, Kraków, Wydawnictwo Literackie, 1985. ISBN 8308003931.
- Encyclopedia of the Holocaust, ed. Israel Gutman, vol. 4, New York, Macmillan Publishing Company, 1995, page 988. ISBN 0028960904.
