= Anton Thumann =

German SS officer (1912–1946)

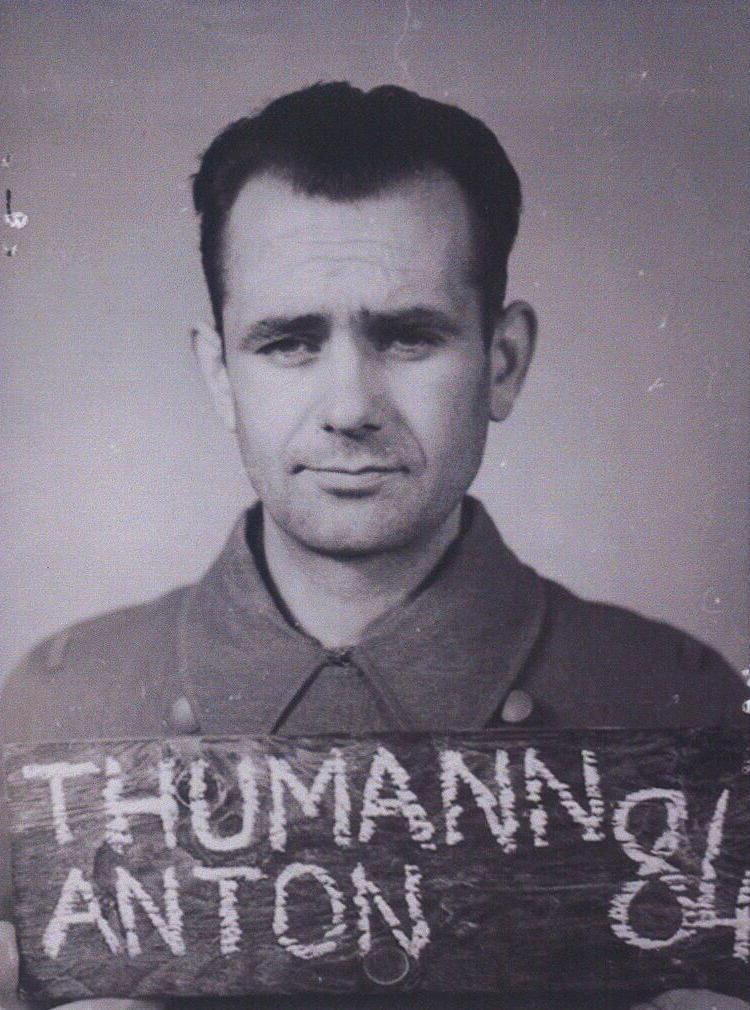
- Anton Thumann in British custody, 1946
- Born: 31 October 1912; Pfaffenhofen an der Ilm, Bavaria, German Empire
- Died: 8 October 1946 (aged 33); Hamelin Prison, Allied-occupied Germany
- Military career
- Allegiance: Nazi Germany
- Branch: Schutzstaffel
- Service years: 1933–1945
- Rank: Obersturmführer
- Nickname: Hangman of Majdanek
- Service number: NSDAP #1,726,633; SS #24,444
- Unit: SS-Totenkopfverbände
- Commands: Schutzhaftlagerführer Gross-Rosen (1941–1943); Schutzhaftlagerführer Majdanek (1943–1944); Schutzhaftlagerführer Neuengamme (1944–1945)
- Criminal information
- Status: Executed by hanging
- Conviction: War crimes
- Penalty: Death

Anton Thumann (31 October 1912 – 8 October 1946) was a member of the SS of Nazi Germany who served in various Nazi concentration camps during World War II. After the war, Thumann was arrested by British occupation forces and charged with war crimes. At the Neuengamme Camp Case No. 1 in 1946 he was found guilty, sentenced to death and executed at Hamelin Prison.

== Biography ==
Thumann was born in Pfaffenhofen an der Ilm, Bavaria, German Empire, in 1912. In the 1930s he joined the Nazi Party (member no. 1,726,633) and the SS (member no. 24,444). He then served as a guard at Dachau concentration camp from 1933 onward. Starting in 1937, Thumann was employed in the Office of Guard Command and ascended to the rank of Protective Custody Camp Leader (German: Schutzhaftlagerführer) in 1940. By early August 1940 he transferred to Gross-Rosen concentration camp, which at the time was still a sub-camp of Sachsenhausen concentration camp. In early May 1941, Thumann became the Protective Custody Camp Leader of the now independent Gross-Rosen camp, under Commander Arthur Rödl.

=== Majdanek ===
From mid-February 1943 to March 1944 he began service as Protective Custody Camp Leader at the Majdanek concentration camp. Due to his sadistic tendencies and participation in selections, gassings and shootings, the prisoners called him the "Hangman of Majdanek". According to eyewitness Jerzy Kwiatkowski, who was interned at Majdanek from March 1943 to July 1944, Thumann personally executed prisoners and Soviet prisoners of war. He owned a German Shepherd that he used to bite the inmates.

For a few weeks between March and April 1944 Thumann was at Auschwitz-Birkenau. Thumann also appears in a series of photographs from an SS recreation camp, the Solahütte near Auschwitz, discovered in 2007. In one of the photos Thumann is pictured with Richard Baer, Josef Mengele, Josef Kramer and Rudolf Hoess.

=== Neuengamme ===
Thumann then served as Protective Custody Camp Leader at Neuengamme concentration camp from mid-April 1944 until the end of April 1945. Often accompanied by his dog, he was very feared in Neuengamme due to a reputation for abuse of prisoners at Gross-Rosen and Majdanek. As the British Army closed in on Neuengamme, the SS began an evacuation of the prisoners to prison ships. During the evacuation, 58 male and 13 female resistance fighters from nearby Fuhlsbüttel concentration camp were selected to be brought to Neuengamme to be executed on the orders of the Higher SS and Police Leader Georg-Henning Graf von Bassewitz-Behr. With the participation of Thumann, these prisoners were hanged between 21 and 23 April 1945 in a detention cell. After some of the doomed men continued to resist, Thumann threw a hand grenade through the cell window. Under the command of Thumann and Wilhelm Dreimann, the last 700 prisoners remaining at Neuengamme were forced to dispose of bodies and cover up the traces of the camp. On 30 April 1945 the prisoners were then sent on a death march with the aim of reaching the area of the Flensburg government. Georg Gussregen was his untersturmführer at Gross-Rosen.

== Trial and execution ==
At the end of the war Thumann was arrested by the British occupation forces. Thumann was put on trial before a British military tribunal in the Neuengamme Camp Case No. 1 in Hamburg. Thumann and 13 other defendants, including Wilhelm Dreimann and the Commandant of Neuengamme Max Pauly, were charged with war crimes. The court handed down a guilty verdict on 18 March 1946 and sentenced 11 of the 14 defendants to death by hanging on 3 May 1946, including Thumann, Dreimann, and Pauly. The death sentence was carried out by British executioner Albert Pierrepoint at Hamelin Prison on 8 October 1946.

== Literature ==
- Ernst Klee: Das Personenlexikon zum Dritten Reich: Wer war was vor und nach 1945. Fischer-Taschenbuch-Verlag, Frankfurt am Main 2007, ISBN 978-3-596-16048-8
- Hermann Kaienburg: Das Konzentrationslager Neuengamme 1938-1945. Dietz, Bonn 1997, ISBN 3-8012-3076-7
- Wolfgang Benz, Barbara Distel, Angelika Königseder: Der Ort des Terrors - Geschichte der nationalsozialistischen Konzentrationslager, Band 7, C.H.Beck, 2005, ISBN 3406529674
