= David G. Marwell =

American historian

- Born: 1951 (age 74–75)
- Education: BA, Brandeis University; PhD, Binghamton University
- Occupation: Historian
- Known for: Director of the Museum of Jewish Heritage; forensic research on Nazi war criminals
- Notable work: Mengele: Unmasking the Angel of Death

David G. Marwell (born 1951) is an American historian and the former director of the Museum of Jewish Heritage in New York City. Marwell served as Chief of Investigative research for the U.S. Department of Justice Office of Special Investigations, where he conducted historical and forensic research into war criminals, including Josef Mengele and Klaus Barbie.

== Education ==
Marwell was born to Edward M. Marwell and Grace Glass Marwell. He received a BA from Brandeis University and a Ph.D. in modern European history from Binghamton University.

== Career ==
Prior to his work at the U.S. Holocaust Memorial Museum in Washington, D.C. from 1997 to 2000, Marwell was director of the Berlin Document Center from 1988 to 1994 and then executive director of the Assassination Records Review Board.

He also served as Chief of Investigative Research for the U.S. Department of Justice Office of Special Investigations. In that capacity, Marwell was responsible for conducting historical and forensic research in support of Justice Department prosecution of Nazi war criminals, including Klaus Barbie and Josef Mengele. He has also served as an expert witness and consultant to the governments of Canada and Australia on several war crime prosecutions, and was a member of the Interagency Working Group for Nazi War Criminal Documents. Marwell also serves as President of the Leo Baeck Institute and on the board of the FASPE (Fellowships at Auschwitz for the Study of Professional Ethics), the Auschwitz Jewish Center in Oświęcim, the Defiant Requiem Foundation, and the Center for Jewish History.

In 2020, Marwell published Mengele: Unmasking the Angel of Death, a forensic account of Josef Mengele's life and career.

== Works ==
- Mengele: Unmasking the "Angel of Death". Norton & Company, Incorporated, W.W., 2020. ISBN 9780393609530
