= Höcker Album =

Photographic record of the Holocaust

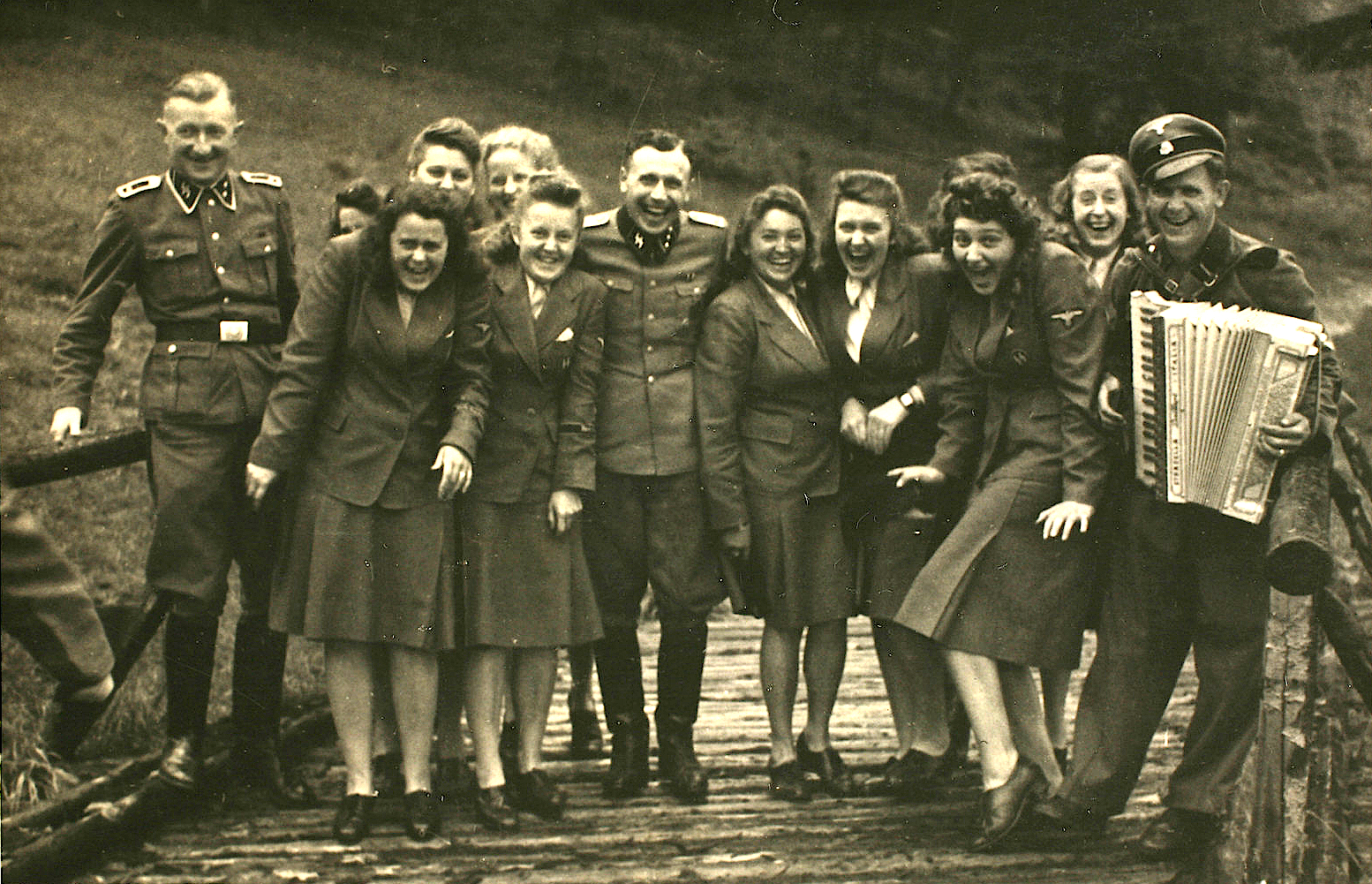
Nazi officers and auxiliaries having fun at Solahütte

The Höcker Album (or Hoecker Album) is a collection of photographs believed to have been collected by Karl-Friedrich Höcker, an officer in the SS during the Nazi regime in Germany. It contains over one hundred images of the lives and living conditions of the officers and administrators who ran the Auschwitz-Birkenau concentration camp complex. The album is unique and an indispensable document of the Holocaust; it is now in the archives of the United States Holocaust Memorial Museum (USHMM) in Washington, D.C.

== Discovery ==
According to the museum, the photograph album was found by an unnamed American counterintelligence officer who was billeted in Frankfurt after Germany's surrender in 1945. This officer discovered the photo album in an apartment there, and when he returned to the United States, he took the album with him.

In January 2007, the American officer donated the album to the USHMM, with the request that his identity not be disclosed. The captions of the photographs, and the people featured in the images, quickly confirmed that it depicts life in and around the Auschwitz camps. The very first photograph is a double portrait of Richard Baer, Auschwitz camp commandant between 1944 and 1945, and Baer's adjutant, Karl Höcker.

== Contents ==
The album contains 116 photographs, all in black and white, almost all of them featuring German officers. It is believed to have been the property of Höcker because he appears in far more of the images than any other individual. On the title page underneath a picture of Höcker and Baer (a Stubaf or Sturmbannführer) it is written "With the Commandant SS Stubaf. Baer, Auschwitz 21.6.44", identifying Höcker as the owner of the album. He is also the only person in the album to appear alone in any of the images.

Some of the images depict formal events, like military funerals and the dedication of a new hospital. They also include images of the camp officers relaxing at a staff retreat known as the Solahütte, a rustic lodge only around 20 miles away from the camp complex. These images are regarded as the most striking, because they show cheerful staff officers singing, drinking and eating while, in the camp itself, tremendous suffering is taking place.

A number of the photographs show officers relaxing in the company of young women—stenographers and typists, trained at the SS school in Obernai, who were known generally as SS Helferinnen, the German word for (female) "helpers".

== Mengele photographs ==
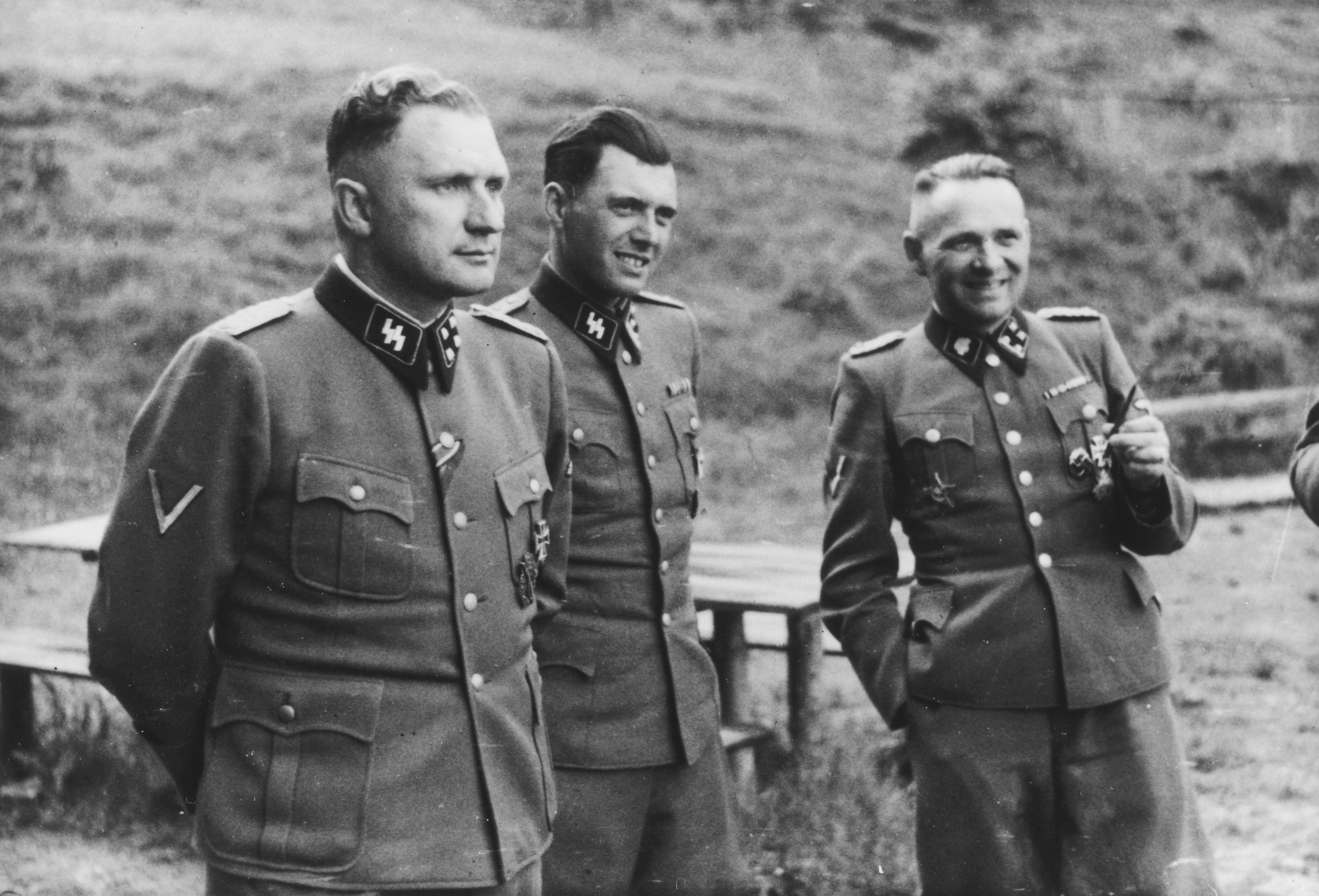
From left to right, Baer, Mengele and Höss at Solahütte

Both of the camp's most well-known commanders, Richard Baer and Rudolf Höss, are visible in the photographs. Josef Mengele, known to camp prisoners as the "Angel of Death", was a trained physician, who directed medical experiments on twin children in the camp. He regularly took part in the "selection" on the train arrival platform, judging which prisoners would be immediately executed and which would be permitted to live and perform slave labor.

In all, the album contains eight photographs depicting Mengele. Before the donation of the album to the museum, no known images showed him within the camp grounds.

The photographs of Mengele were all taken at the SS resort Solahütte. These photographs appear to have been taken on July 29, 1944, to honour the end of Höss's second tenure as garrison senior. Other officers depicted at these celebrations alongside Mengele and Höss include Josef Kramer, Franz Hoessler, Walter Schmidetzki, Anton Thumann, Otto Moll and Max Sell.

== Timing of photographs ==
The photographs in the Höcker Album are viewed as especially chilling because of the time during which they were made, between June and December 1944. It has been noted by archivists and historians that this period overlaps with the mass extermination of hundreds of thousands of Hungarian Jews in the spring and summer of 1944—an event known as "the Hungarian Transport". These Jews were gathered and shipped to Auschwitz after the March 1944 invasion of Hungary by the Nazis. So many Hungarian Jews were killed in the Auschwitz camps during that period that the crematoria were incapable of consuming all the bodies, so open pits were dug for that purpose.

According to Rebecca Erbelding, the museum archivist who received the album from its donor and first recognized its significance, "the album reminds us that the perpetrators of the Holocaust were human beings, men and women with families, children and pets, who celebrated holidays and took vacations... These people were human beings... and these photographs remind us what human beings are capable of when they succumb to anti-Semitism, racism and hatred."

== Höcker's case ==
Höcker married before the war and had a son and daughter during the war, with whom he was reunited after his release from 18 months in a British POW camp in 1946. Early in the 1960s, he was apprehended by West German authorities in his hometown, where he was a bank official. It is not known why the bank rehired and promoted him after a long absence during which he had nothing to do with banking.

At his trial in Frankfurt, part of the noted Frankfurt Auschwitz trials, Höcker denied having participated in the selection of victims at Birkenau or having ever personally executed a prisoner. He further denied any knowledge of the fate of the approximately 400,000 Hungarian Jews who were murdered at Auschwitz during his term of service at the camp. Höcker was shown to have knowledge of the genocidal activities at the camp, but could not be proved to have played a direct part in them. In postwar trials, Höcker denied his involvement in the selection process. While accounts from survivors and other SS officers all but placed him there, prosecutors could locate no conclusive evidence to prove the claim.

In August 1965 Höcker was sentenced to seven years' imprisonment for aiding and abetting in over 1,000 murders at Auschwitz. He was released in 1970 and was able to return to his bank post as a chief cashier, where he worked until his retirement.

On 3 May 1989 a district court in the German city of Bielefeld sentenced Höcker to four years' imprisonment for his involvement in gassing to death prisoners, primarily Polish Jews, in the Majdanek concentration camp in Poland. Camp records showed that between May 1943 and May 1944 Höcker had acquired at least 3,610 kilograms (7,960 lb) of Zyklon B poisonous gas for use in Majdanek from the Hamburg firm of Tesch & Stabenow.

== See also ==
- Auschwitz Album
- Sonderkommando photographs
- Wilhelm Brasse
- Bibliography of the Holocaust § Primary Sources
