= Hans Anhalt =

Auschwitz guard (1908–1975)

- Anhalt after his arrest (1962)
- Born: 25 September 1908; Langenfeld, North Rhine-Westphalia, German Empire
- Died: 13 April 1975 (aged 66); Brandenburg-Görden Prison, Brandenburg an der Havel, East Germany
- Status: Deceased
- Motive: Nazism
- Conviction: Crimes against humanity
- Penalty: Life imprisonment

Details
- Span of crimes: 1942 – January 1945
- Country: German-occupied Poland
- Location: Auschwitz concentration camp
- Date apprehended: 8 November 1962
- SS career
- Allegiance: Germany
- Branch: Schutzstaffel
- Rank: Scharführer

Hans Anhalt (25 September 1908 - 13 April 1975) was a member of the Nazi Party who served in the SS. During World War II, he was stationed in Auschwitz concentration camp. There, Anhalt personally murdered multiple prisoners, selecting them to be gassed or experimented on. After the war, he settled in East Germany, until being exposed in 1962. Anhalt was sentenced to life in prison, where he died in 1975.

== SS career ==
During the war, Anhalt worked in Auschwitz. There, he abused and murdered multiple prisoners, fatally shooting at least 8 prisoners while on guard duty. He had at least 10 prisoners burned alive for bartering and participated in the selections of Jews on the arrival ramp and led the selected victims to the gas chamber. He assaulted and shot prisoners who refused to enter the gas chamber.

Anhalt had the prisoners make coats for his children. His wife was aware of what his job entailed. In September 1943, she even visited him once in Auschwitz. The couple stayed with a friend, Otto Moll. Anhalt's wife remained in a garrison near Auschwitz from 11 to 25 September 1943.

Anhalt also stole valuables from murdered victims. On the request of Dr. Josef Mengele, he selected prisoners to be subjected to gruesome experiments by Mengele. During the evacuation of Auschwitz in January 1945, Anhalt killed prisoners who were lagging behind. After his arrest in the 1960s, Anhalt bragged about selecting 300,000 prisoners to be murdered in the gas chambers, albeit this was determined to be an overestimate. Officials believed Anhalt was feigning insanity.

== Post-war life and exposure ==
Anhalt avoided immediate detection after the war. He lived a quiet life with his family in Thuringia in East Germany, working as a tractor driver. In 1951, officials became aware that Anhalt was possibly a former SS member who had worked in Auschwitz. However, they did not immediately further investigate the matter.

In October 1962, the Stasi received a tip-off about Anhalt. He had recently started pawning-off the stolen belongings of Auschwitz victims, and his neighbors were confused when he suddenly started making large amounts of money given his job. The Stasi started spying on Anhalt, and created a file for him under the nickname "Eichmann". On 8 November 1962 they detained him as a suspected war criminal. During questioning the next day, Anhalt admitted to being a guard at Auschwitz, but denied personally committing any atrocities. The Stasi searched his house, where they found multiple items stolen from Auschwitz. The items included gloves and purses. Anhalt signed a typed confession in which he admitted to taking items from Jewish prisoners who had been gassed.

During an interrogation on 21 August 1963, Anhalt said, "During my service in the Auschwitz concentration camp, I did not commit any crimes whatsoever. At least I don't see the shooting, killing, beating and ill-treating of prisoners in the Auschwitz concentration camp as a crime. I simply fulfilled my duty as a National Socialist and sometimes acted out of personal interest to speed up the extermination of the Jews." On 20 July 1964 a court in Erfurt found Anhalt guilty of murder and crimes against humanity. He was sentenced to life in prison, and died there on 13 April 1975.

The objects found by the Stasi during their investigation
