= Enno Lolling =

SS doctor

Lolling with Richard Baer, commandant of Auschwitz, and his adjutant Karl-Friedrich Höcker (left to right)

Enno Lolling (July 19, 1888 – May 27, 1945) was a Nazi doctor. As a member of the SS, he served as a Lagerarzt (camp doctor) at Dachau concentration camp. He later headed up the medical division for all the SS concentration camps. Lolling committed suicide in Flensburg as the war was ending.

== Biography ==
Lolling was born in Cologne. He attended gymnasium, graduating in 1905 with his abitur. He studied medicine, passing the state examination in August 1914 at Charité in Berlin, the medical school of Humboldt University and the Free University of Berlin. Continuing his studies in Kiel, he later received his doctorate.

== Military service ==
Lolling served in the German army, as a volunteer from 1907 to 1908, then in the Kaiserliche Marine from April 1, 1908, to January 17, 1919. He began serving as a navy doctor in 1913, earning promotions every year or two as he rose through the ranks to become a naval staff doctor in 1918.

During World War I, he was an assistant doctor on board the battleship SMS Wittelsbach until November 1915, then ship doctor on the aviso Pfeil until January 1917, and assistant doctor on the battleship Hannover until August 1917. Following that, until April 1918, he served as an assistant doctor at the navy hospital in Mürwik, a section of Flensburg. From there, he became an assistant doctor with the First Naval Air Division, serving until June 1918, then as assistant doctor with the Second Coastal Battalion in Flanders until the end of the war. At the end of January 1919, he left the navy and began working as a doctor in Neustrelitz.

== Nazi era ==
Lolling joined the Nazi Party in 1931, becoming member No. 4,691,483. He had already joined the Sturmabteilung (SA) in 1923 and on August 28, 1933, he joined the Schutzstaffel (SS) as member No. 179,765.

On September 13, 1936, Lolling obtained the rank of Hauptsturmführer. From May 2, 1936, till May 29, he completed an exercise with the Kriegsmarine (navy). On July 30, 1936, he had to assert that he had been free from morphine since 1932 and therefore was not addicted.

Lolling was accepted as a general practitioner and in September 1936, was appointed SS squadron doctor and medic with the SS-Verfügungstruppe at the SS military academy in Bad Tölz. In early November 1936, he became a doctor at the SS military hospital in Dachau.

In early 1939, Lolling was deployed with the 3rd SS Division Totenkopf. From May 6, 1940, to February 11, 1941, he worked as a camp doctor at Dachau concentration camp. On February 12, 1941, he was appointed by the SS-Führungshauptamt to be the chief camp physician at Sachsenhausen concentration camp.

In early June 1941, Lolling became the chief physician at the Concentration Camps Inspectorate. On March 3, 1942, he was put in charge of Amt D III of the SS-Wirtschafts-Verwaltungshauptamt for Medical Services and Camp Hygiene, with headquarters at Oranienburg, at the edge of Sachsenhausen concentration camp. With this promotion, he was put in charge of all medical units and doctors at all SS concentration camps. From May to July 1942, he was forced to take a leave of absence because of a serious illness. Julius Muthig took over during this period of time. On November 9, 1943, Lolling was promoted to the rank of SS-Standartenführer, but continued in his same position at Amt D III.

After this final promotion, Lolling ordered a collection of human skins with tattoos to be prepared in different ways and sent to Berlin. Hundreds were prepared. Healthy prisoners were killed with an injection to the heart, so as not to damage the tattoos. Lolling also ordered SS doctors to experiment with shrinking human heads and at least three were shrunk.

Lolling was responsible for assigning doctors to the various SS-run concentration camps. He was superior to the Standortarzt at each camp, who in turn, were superior to the camp doctors assigned to them. During the Hamburg Ravensbrück Trials, he was repeatedly named by the accused as the medical person in authority.

On May 27, 1945, Lolling committed suicide at the reserve army hospital in Flensburg. He was 56.

== Sources ==
- Johannes Tuchel, Konzentrationslager. Band 39 von Konzentrationslager: Organisationsgeschichte und Funktion der Inspektion der Konzentrationslager 1934-1938, H. Boldt, Boppard am Rhein (1991) ISBN 3-7646-1902-3 (in German)
- Ernst Klee, Das Personenlexikon zum Dritten Reich: Wer war was vor und nach 1945, Fischer-Taschenbuch-Verlag, Frankfurt am Main (2007) ISBN 978-3-596-16048-8 (in German)
- Schäfer, Silke, Zum Selbstverständnis von Frauen im Konzentrationslager. Das Lager Ravensbrück (PDF) Dissertation. Berlin (2002) (in German)
- Taake, Claudia, Angeklagt: SS-Frauen vor Gericht, Oldenburg (1998) ISBN 3-8142-0640-1 (in German)
