= Otto Moll =

Nazi mass murderer (1915–1946)

- Born: 4 March 1915; Hohen Schönberg, Grand Duchy of Mecklenburg-Strelitz, German Empire
- Died: 28 May 1946 (aged 31); Landsberg Prison, Allied-occupied Germany
- Other names: Cyclops; Butcher of Birkenau
- Status: Executed by hanging
- Motive: Nazism; Sadism
- Conviction: War crimes
- Trial: Dachau camp trial
- Penalty: Death
- SS career
- Allegiance: Nazi Germany
- Branch: Schutzstaffel
- Service years: 1935–1945
- Rank: Hauptscharführer

Otto Hermann Wilhelm Moll (4 March 1915 – 28 May 1946) was an SS non-commissioned officer and war criminal who was one of the worst perpetrators at Auschwitz concentration camp during the Second World War. Moll held the rank of SS-Hauptscharführer and the position of SS Rapportführer, a senior SS position within the SS guard units (the Totenkopfverbände) sanctioned within the camp. Moll was known as "Cyclops", due to having a glass eye, and as the "Butcher of Birkenau".

Moll is said personally to have killed hundreds at Birkenau, and oversaw the deaths of hundreds of thousands while at the camp, such as of the Hungarian Jews in 1944. He served as the chief of the crematorium/extermination zone at Birkenau from 1943 to 1945, a role that he carried out with immense cruelty. Many eyewitnesses described Moll as a sadistic killer who routinely threw victims, usually children, alive into burning pits, carried out executions by shooting, torture, and immolation, and sexually humiliated victims prior to their deaths.

Moll never stood trial for his role at Auschwitz, having left shortly before its liberation and instead surrendering to the U.S. Army at Dachau in April 1945. However, in November 1945, he was charged as a war criminal at the U.S.-run Dachau camp trial. A month later, Moll was found guilty and sentenced by hanging. He was executed in 1946.

Otto Moll has been described as "the ultimate example of the cruel 'Nazi spirit'", while doctor Miklós Nyiszli described Moll as "the most insane murderer of the World War". Moll has also been described as "the sadistic and cruel executor of the 'Final Solution,' a man who was the terror of both the Jews and the SS men", and as one of the "most sadistic and evil figures in the history of Auschwitz".

== Early life ==
Moll was born in the town of Hohen Schönberg in the German Empire, on 4 March 1915. He trained as a gardener before joining the SS on 1 May 1935 (serial number 277670).

Moll joined the battalion orchestra which performed in SS barracks or in public places. In January 1937, he was returning home from a concert when the truck in which he and other SS musicians were traveling got into an accident. One SS man was killed, while Moll suffered serious head trauma and was blinded in his right eye.

"His straight blond hair was cut short. In his chiseled face were set a pair of cold blue eyes. Only one of them was real, for he had lost the other fighting in France. When he spoke, only the live eye shifted. There seemed to be no real feeling in the heart beating beneath his bulging chest."

Hans Schmid, a German historian who has written extensively about Moll, considers it very likely that he suffered from frontal lobe syndrome from the accident. An American forensic scientist examined, among other things, witness statements about Moll's actions and came to this diagnosis. Frontal lobe syndrome is organic damage that can manifest itself in psychotic or psychopathic behavior. A dulling of feelings, exaggerated spirit of enterprise, general disinhibition and particular pity are symptoms.

Schmid discusses Moll's criminal career with a strong focus on his mental state and concluded that he was a physically and mentally ill person who was deliberately exploited by a criminal regime. As such, Moll may not qualify as a "normal German" who became a perpetrator.

== SS career ==
Moll joined the SS-Totenkopfverbände, the SS Death's Head Units responsible for administering the Nazi concentration camps and extermination camps for Nazi Germany. One of his earliest jobs was as a Kommandoführer in charge of the camp's gardeners' work detail. In May 1941, Moll was transferred from the Sachsenhausen concentration camp to Auschwitz where he was put in charge of digging mass graves. Over the next three and half years, Moll served in several staff roles at the camp. He soon became the director of employment services at the men's camp in Auschwitz II (Birkenau). In 1944, Moll oversaw all the crematoria in Birkenau. He also was a Lagerführer of the Auschwitz sub-camps of Fürstengrube in Wesola and Gleiwitz I. According to Auschwitz commandant Rudolf Höss, he and Moll were both decorated by Adolf Hitler with the War Merit Cross, First Class with Swords. He appears several times in the photo album belonging to Auschwitz commandant Karl-Friedrich Höcker that showed SS camp staff on leave at the retreat called Solahütte. From 11 to 25 September 1943, the wife of one of Otto Moll's friends, Hans Anhalt stayed at a garrison near Auschwitz with his permission.

Moll is said personally to have killed hundreds at Birkenau, and oversaw the deaths of hundreds of thousands while at the camp, such as of the Hungarian Jews in 1944. Moll served as the chief of the crematorium/extermination zone at Birkenau from 1943 to 1945, a role that he carried out with immense cruelty.

Moll would say to his personnel: "Befehl ist Befehl!" ("An order is an order!") to justify his actions. This was an attitude that other defendants at the Nuremberg Trials also cited as a defence.

=== Brutality ===
In 1944, after realizing that the crematoria were not sufficient to burn the number of Jewish people arriving at the camp, Moll forced prisoners to dig large open-air pits to incinerate excess bodies. He also reopened a farmhouse which had been previously used as a makeshift gas chamber.

Alter Feinsilber, a member of the Sonderkommando at Birkenau who worked for Moll, later recounted:

At that time, on average around 18,000 Hungarians were murdered daily at Birkenau. Transports would come from dawn till dusk, one after another, and around 20% of those arriving were sent to the camp. They were recorded in series A and B. The rest were gassed and incinerated in the crematorium furnaces. In cases where there were not enough prisoners, they were executed by shooting and burned in pits. As a rule, a gas chamber was only utilized for groups bigger than 200 people because it was uneconomical to use it for smaller groups. It sometimes happened that during executions by shooting some prisoners put up a fight or children cried, and then Oberscharführer Moll would throw these people into the burning pits alive. I personally witnessed the following scenes. Moll ordered a naked woman to sit on the corpses near a pit, while he shot at prisoners and threw them to the burning pit, ordering the woman to jump and sing. Of course she did so, in hopes of saving her life. After executing everybody, Moll shot this woman and she was then incinerated. On another occasion, Moll found a few rings and a watch on a boy from our group. He halted him at the crematory, had him thrown into a furnace, started a fire using paper, and then they got him out, hanged him by his arms, tortured and interrogated him to find out where he had gotten the items found on him. Of course, he told them everything, identified the prisoner who had given these items to him, and then he was set on fire from the waist down and was ordered to run toward the wires, where he was executed.

Another Sonderkommando prisoner named Henryk Tauber testified:

Hauptscharführer Moll was the most degenerate of the lot. Before his arrival at the camp, he was in charge of the work at the Bunkers, where they incinerated the gassed victims in pits. Then he was transferred for a while to another section. In view of the preparation necessary for the "reception" of convoys from Hungary in 1944, he was put in charge of all the crematoria. It is he who organized the large-scale extermination of the people arriving in these convoys. Just before the arrival of the Hungarian transports, he ordered pits to be dug alongside crematoria V and restarted the activity of Bunker 2, which had been lying idle, and its pits. In the yard of the crematory, there were notices on posts, with inscriptions telling the new arrivals from the transports that they were to go to the camp where work was waiting for them, but that first they had to take a bath and undergo disinfestation. For that, it was necessary for them to undress and put all their valuables in baskets specially placed for this purpose in the yard. Moll repeated the same thing in his speeches to the new arrivals. There were so many convoys that sometimes it happened that the gas chambers were incapable of containing all the new arrivals. The excess people were generally shot, one at a time and often by Moll himself. On several occasions, Moll threw people into the flaming pits alive. He also practised shooting people from a distance. He ill-treated and beat Sonderkommando prisoners, treating them like animals. Those who were in his personal service told us that he used a piece of wire to fish out gold objects from the box containing the jewels taken from new arrivals, and took them off in a briefcase. Among the objects left by the people who came to be gassed, he took furs and different types of food, in particular fat. When he took food, he said smilingly to the SS around him that one had to take advantage before the lean years came. Under his direction, the Sonderkommando was strengthened and increased to about 1000 prisoners.

Another Sonderkommando prisoner named Filip Müller testified and later wrote about Moll:

The head of the crematoria, Moll, once took a child away from its mother, I saw it at Crematorium IV. There were two huge pits where the corpses were burned. He threw the child into the boiling corpse fat that had collected in ditches around the pit and then said to his assistant: "Now I'll eat till I'm satiated, now I have done my duty." Another way to satisfy his [Moll's] perverse murder lust was the killing of little children who he threw alive into the boiling human fat at the front sides of the pits. When the camp commandant or other SS commanders appeared at the site of the crematoria, however, Moll controlled himself and subdued his abnormal tendencies. Then the machinery of murder took its customary, factory-like course, without there being any special excesses.

In the book We Wept Without Tears, which features testimony from camp survivors, including many who describe Moll, survivor Shlomo Dragon said

Once we found a baby who'd been stuffed into a pillow and was still alive. The baby's head was also buried in the pillow. After we removed the pillow, the baby opened his eyes. Meaning he was still alive. We took the bundle to Moll and told him he was alive. Moll took the kid to the edge of the pit, put him on the ground, stepped on his neck, and threw him into the fire.

Another former prisoner said,

Moll...was so zealous and crazy that he personally took part in the cremations. Once he was overheard saying that if Eichmann ordered him to cremate his family, he'd do it. Moll revealed his sadism at times when he circulated among mothers who were about to be gassed and chatted with a boy whom they carried. He did it with a chuckle. He'd hug the boy, give him some candy, and try to talk the mother into handing the boy over. Then he'd take the kid to the pit and throw him into the fire alive.

Other times, Moll would lure the child way entirely on his own. Moll would also place naked women at the edge of the pits, shoot them in the stomach so they would fall over, and watch them burn to death, beat people with clubs and iron bars, douse people with petrol and set them on fire, set dogs on them, throw them against electric fences, and smash children into concrete walls in front of their mothers. One instance was recounted by Mel Mermenstein who notes that Moll selected twenty "beautiful" women from a transport that had just arrived and proceeded to then have them "undress and stand naked facing him in a single row. He then shot all of them, one by one, in full view of witnesses." For him, sexual humiliation of his victims was a recurring component of the acts that culminated in their murder. Filip Müller, an eyewitness, also recounted that:

Moll had a morbid partiality for obscene and salacious tortures. Thus it was his wont to turn up in the crematorium when the victims were taking off their clothes…Like a meat inspector he would stride about the changing room, selecting a couple of naked young women and hustling them to one of the pits … In the end he shot them from behind so that they fell forward in the burning pit.

Dario Gabbai was quoted in Laurence Rees's book The Holocaust: A New History, where he shared Moll "liked to kill naked girls by shooting them 'on their breasts'."

"In 1951 I was going to the city college in Los Angeles to learn English, and the first thing that teacher told me was to write something about the camps you were in. The first thing I wrote – I still have it from 1951 – I wrote two pages about Moll." Long after the war was over Dario Gabbai's heart still 'bumps at maybe two hundred a minute' whenever he hears a motorcycle engine – because Moll used to arrive at the crematoria on a motorbike."

In February 1945, an execution unit headed by Moll murdered approximately 3,000 prisoners deemed to be "dangerous".

== Arrest, trial and execution ==
After Auschwitz-Birkenau was abandoned by the SS on 18 January 1945, Moll was transferred to a sub-camp of Dachau concentration camp. On 28 April 1945, a day before Dachau was liberated by American troops, Moll arrived at the main camp with a group of prisoners whom he had forced on a death march. He'd proposed bombing Dachau and killing the remaining prisoners, but his plan was not carried out. The next day he was taken into custody by the U.S. Army.

In November 1945, Moll was put on trial by an American military court during the Dachau trials. He was only tried for what he did at Dachau. Moll was sentenced to death after being found guilty of fatally shooting prisoners who had collapsed from exhaustion. According to Kapo Wilhelm Metzler, Moll had shot 26 people. After Moll's conviction, Major Draper, a British military prosecutor, sent an urgent request for an interview to the commandant of Landsberg Prison, where Moll was awaiting execution. He requested an interview with him, saying the world needed to know what he had done in Auschwitz. It is not known whether the interview ever took place. However, Moll was interviewed during the Nuremberg trials. Unlike his superior Rudolf Höss, he largely denied involvement in the killing of Jews at Auschwitz. After his case was reviewed, a panel recommended that Moll's sentence be carried out. He was executed by hanging at Landsberg Prison on 28 May 1946.
