= Solahütte =

Recuperation resort for Auschwitz personnel

Coordinates: 49.780683°N 19.19015°E

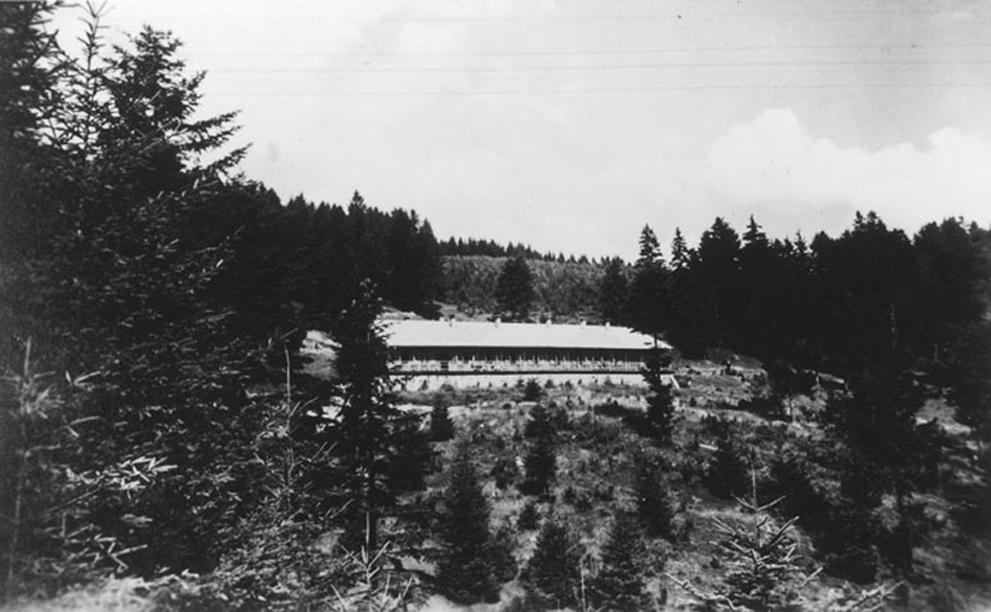
- General view of the Solahütte guest-house of the Nazi German personnel and administration of the Auschwitz concentration camp complex during the Holocaust in occupied Poland. Photograph from the Höcker Album

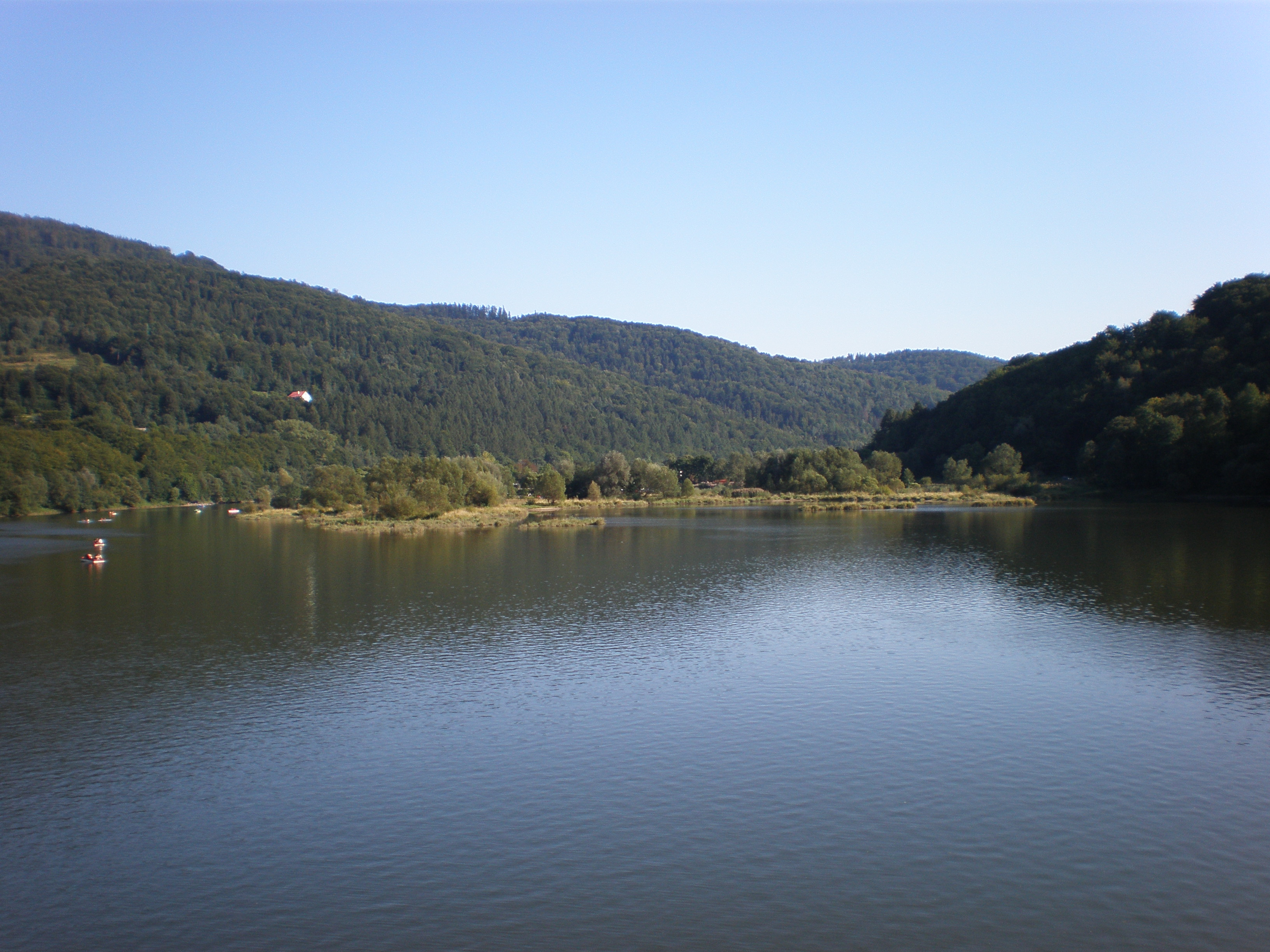
- Lake Międzybrodzkie on the Soła river at the foot of Międzybrodzie Bialskie village, located 30 kilometres (19 mi) south of Auschwitz; about half-an-hour drive along Road DW 948

Solahütte (a.k.a. Solehütte, Soletal, SS-Hütte Soletal, or SS Hütte Porombka) was a resort in Poland for the Nazi German guards, administrators, and auxiliary personnel of the Auschwitz/Birkenau/Buna facilities during the Holocaust in occupied Poland. Although postcards of the era sent by German staff sometimes bore the mysterious pre-printed return address "SS Hütte Soletal", the rustic hamlet remained largely unknown to historians until 2007, when the Höcker Album of memorabilia owned by SS officer Karl-Friedrich Höcker including vintage Auschwitz photographs was donated to the United States Holocaust Memorial Museum, which then released images from the album online for study. Some of the photographs identified Solahütte for the first time.

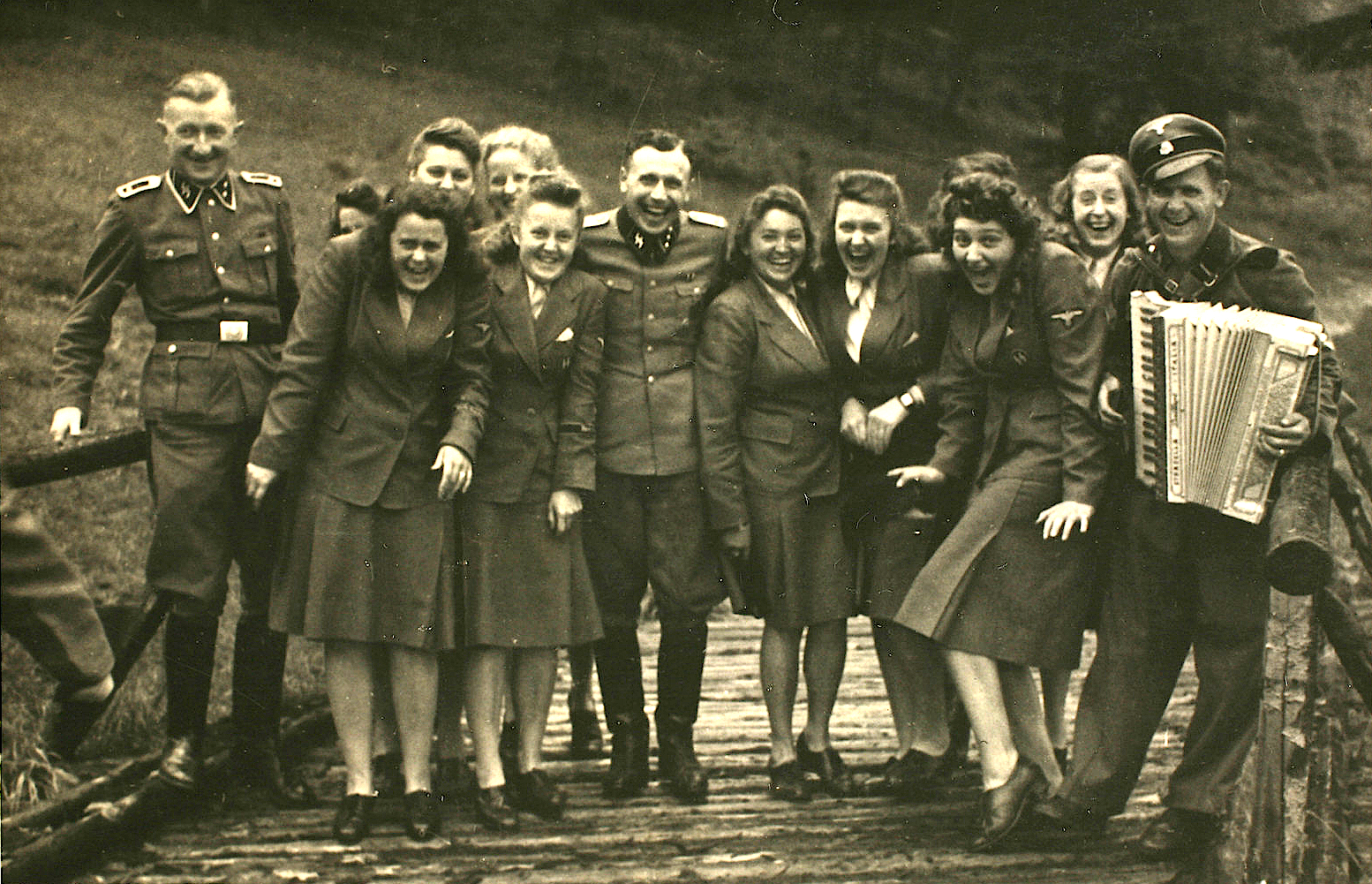
Nazi officers and auxiliaries having fun at Solahütte.

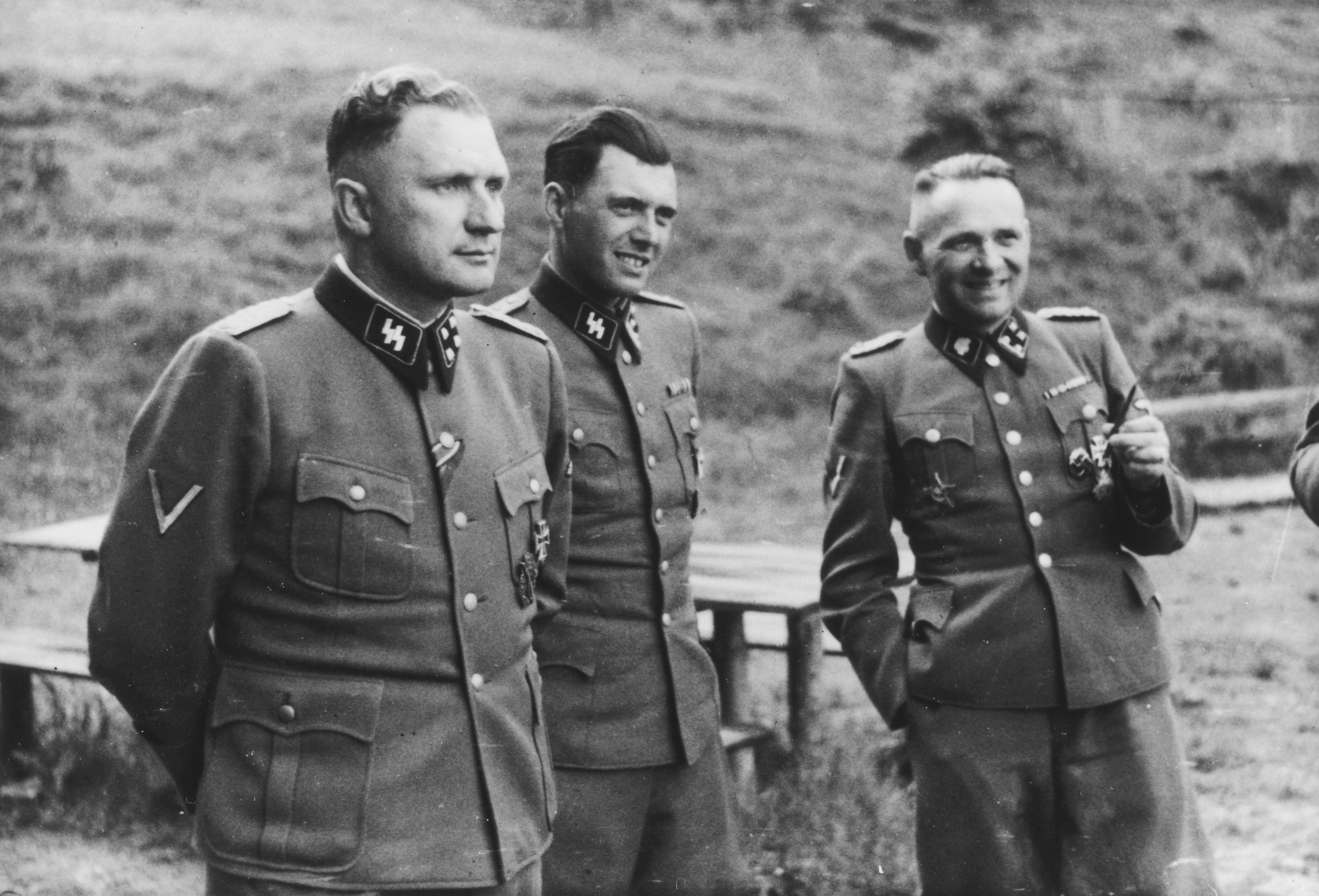
From left to right, Baer, Mengele, and Höss at Solahütte.

Solahütte is around 29 kilometres (18 miles) by car from Auschwitz. The site is located near the bends in the Soła river where in 1935 engineers finished a heavy dam which created the scenic Międzybrodzkie reservoir lake. The villages of Porąbka and Międzybrodzie Żywieckie are close by, along with the Żar glider airstrip and the Żar peak with its funicular incline-tram. The region was already popular with tourists before World War II.

Solahütte can be considered a tiny subcamp of Auschwitz because Auschwitz prisoners, overseen by SS officer Franz Hössler, constructed the rustic getaway facility, and a crew of Auschwitz detainees performed groundskeeping and cleanup work there. Sola and Sole were Germanic approximations of the Polish Soła and Hütte is German for hut, hence the German name Solahütte, meaning "Sola hut" — even though the "hut" was actually a motel-sized building with a full-length sun-deck porch and numerous smaller campus buildings also made up part of the complex. The main lodge building was demolished by the owner in 2011, at the time that it was considered to become a protected monument but various side buildings remain, including the cabin used by Auschwitz commandant Rudolf Höss.

Among the SS officers photographed at Solahütte were Oswald Pohl (executed through the Nuremberg Tribunal), Höss (executed through the Supreme National Tribunal of Poland), and Josef Mengele (nicknamed the "Angel of Death"). The latter was almost never seen photographed in his SS uniform with Auschwitz colleagues until the Solahütte snapshots and a few other images became known. Other guests of the Solahütte resort featured in the Höcker Album include Höcker himself, Richard Baer, Otto Moll, Josef Kramer and various Aufseherinnen.

For the SS guards and SS Helferinnen — the female volunteer typists and clerks of the extermination camp — Solahütte was a nearby vacation option, usually reached by bus. Activities for guests included hunting, hiking, sunbathing, and excursions to the nearby lake and peaks. Wartime snapshots made at Solahütte are jarring because of the lightheartedness of the people pictured. Some of history's most infamous war criminals are shown cheerily singing along to accordion music, loafing on deckchairs, or giggling over desserts with the female Aufseherinnen or Helferinnen.

== In popular culture ==
The critically acclaimed novel The Constant Soldier by William Ryan is inspired by the photographs of the Solahütte guest-house.

The 2022 play Here There Are Blueberries, written by playwrights Moisés Kaufman and Amanda Gronich, examines the history of the donation of Karl-Friedrich Höcker's album of photographs of Solahütte, including the titular photograph of SS female auxiliaries eating blueberries, to the United States Holocaust Memorial Museum.

== See also ==
- Auschwitz and List of subcamps of Auschwitz
- Auschwitz Album
