= Richard Baer =

Final commandant of Auschwitz I (1911–1963)

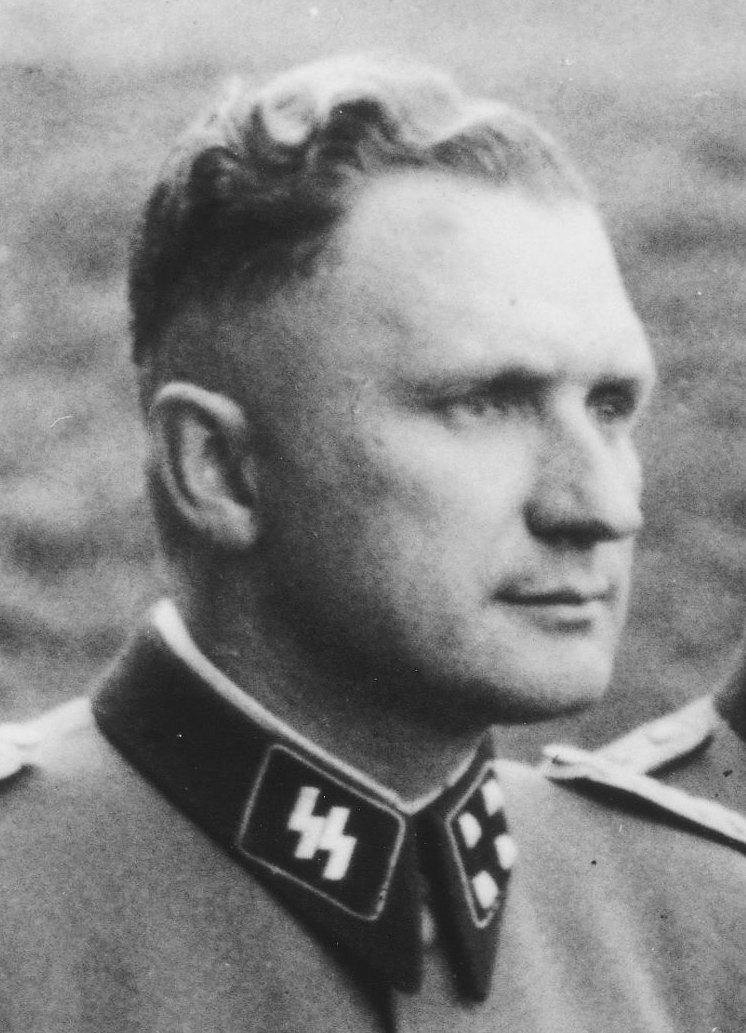
- Baer at Solahütte in 1944
- Born: 9 September 1911; Floß, Kingdom of Bavaria, German Empire
- Died: 17 June 1963 (aged 51); Frankfurt am Main, Hesse, West Germany
- Political party: Nazi Party #454,991 (SS #44,225)
- SS service
- Branch: SS-Totenkopfverbände; Waffen-SS
- Service years: 1933–1945
- Rank: SS-Sturmbannführer
- Commands: commandant in Auschwitz I concentration camp (May 1944-February 1945) commandant in Mittelbau-Dora concentration camp (February–April 1945)

Richard Baer (9 September 1911 – 17 June 1963) was a German SS officer who, among other assignments, was the final commandant of Auschwitz I concentration camp from May 1944 to January 1945, and right after, from February to April 1945, commandant of Mittelbau-Dora concentration camp. Following the war, Baer lived under an assumed name to avoid prosecution but was recognized and arrested in December 1960. He died in detention before he could stand trial.

== Life and Nazi career ==
Born in Floss, Bavaria on 9 September 1911, Baer grew up in a Protestant family. In 1925, he moved to Weiden in der Oberpfalz, where he performed a three-year apprenticeship to become a pastry chef. After completing his vocational training, Baer toured Bavaria for several years as a journeyman. Eventually, in the winter of 1932, he returned to the pastry company of his apprenticeship and worked there until he resigned in March 1933.

Baer joined the Nazi Party in 1930, and on 1 July 1932, he became a member of the Allgemeine SS. In the local SS post in Weiden, he met the future concentration camp commandant Martin Gottfried Weiss. Under the direction of Weiss, a small SS gang offered protection to speakers at weekend public meetings of the Nazi Party in the surrounding villages. Baer later stated that he had joined the Allgemeine SS because he liked the "soldier discipline" and the "joy of playing soldiers".

After the Nazis came to power, most of the SS men in Weiden served as auxiliary police officers locally and, as early as mid-April 1933, they were assigned as guards to the Dachau concentration camp, where Baer was subject to military drills, Nazi ideological indoctrination, and hard training in systematic techniques for the terrorisation of prisoners. His teacher was Theodor Eicke, the camp commandant since June 1933 and shaper of the so-called "Dachau Model" of the Nazi concentration camp system. Baer described the training for guard duty in Dachau as being "very strict" and "sharply polished": "The more we were polished, the more proud we were of it".

Enno Lolling, the director of Office DIII "Sanitation and Hygiene" in Department D "Concentration camps Inspectorate" of the SS Main Economic and Administrative Office; with Richard Baer, commandant of Auschwitz I, and his adjutant Karl-Friedrich Höcker (left to right)

From December 1934 to end-March 1935, Baer performed guard duty at the infamous Gestapo prison Columbia-Haus in Berlin. He was later assigned to the SS-Totenkopfverbände (SS-TV) 2nd regiment Brandenburg, which in 1936 was involved in the build up of the Sachsenhausen concentration camp. After taking a platoon commander course in Oranienburg concentration camp, Baer served from March to September 1938 with the SS-TV 3rd regiment Thuringen in Buchenwald concentration camp. In September 1938, Baer was promoted to SS-Untersturmführer (second lieutenant) and, at the end of the same year, he headed the first group of guards in the newly established Neuengamme concentration camp, then still a sub-camp of the Sachsenhausen concentration camp. In September 1940, he became a commando overseer. At the end of 1940, Baer asked to join the front line and, after completing a course to become a company commander, he was sent to the Eastern front. In December 1941, as a result of a wound, he was transferred back to Neuengamme concentration camp.

In 1942, Baer was appointed adjutant to the commandant of the Neuengamme concentration camp. At Neuengamme, he participated in the killing of Soviet prisoners-of-war in a special gas chamber and in the selection of prisoners for the so-called Operation 14f13 in the T4 Euthanasia Program. From November 1942 to May 1944, Baer was adjutant to Oswald Pohl, then chief of the SS Main Economic and Administrative Office. In November 1943, he took over the office DI (Central Office) in the Department D "Concentration camps Inspectorate". He succeeded Arthur Liebehenschel, considered by Himmler to be too "soft" with the prisoners, as the third and final commandant of Auschwitz I from 11 May 1944, until the final dissolution of the camp in early 1945.

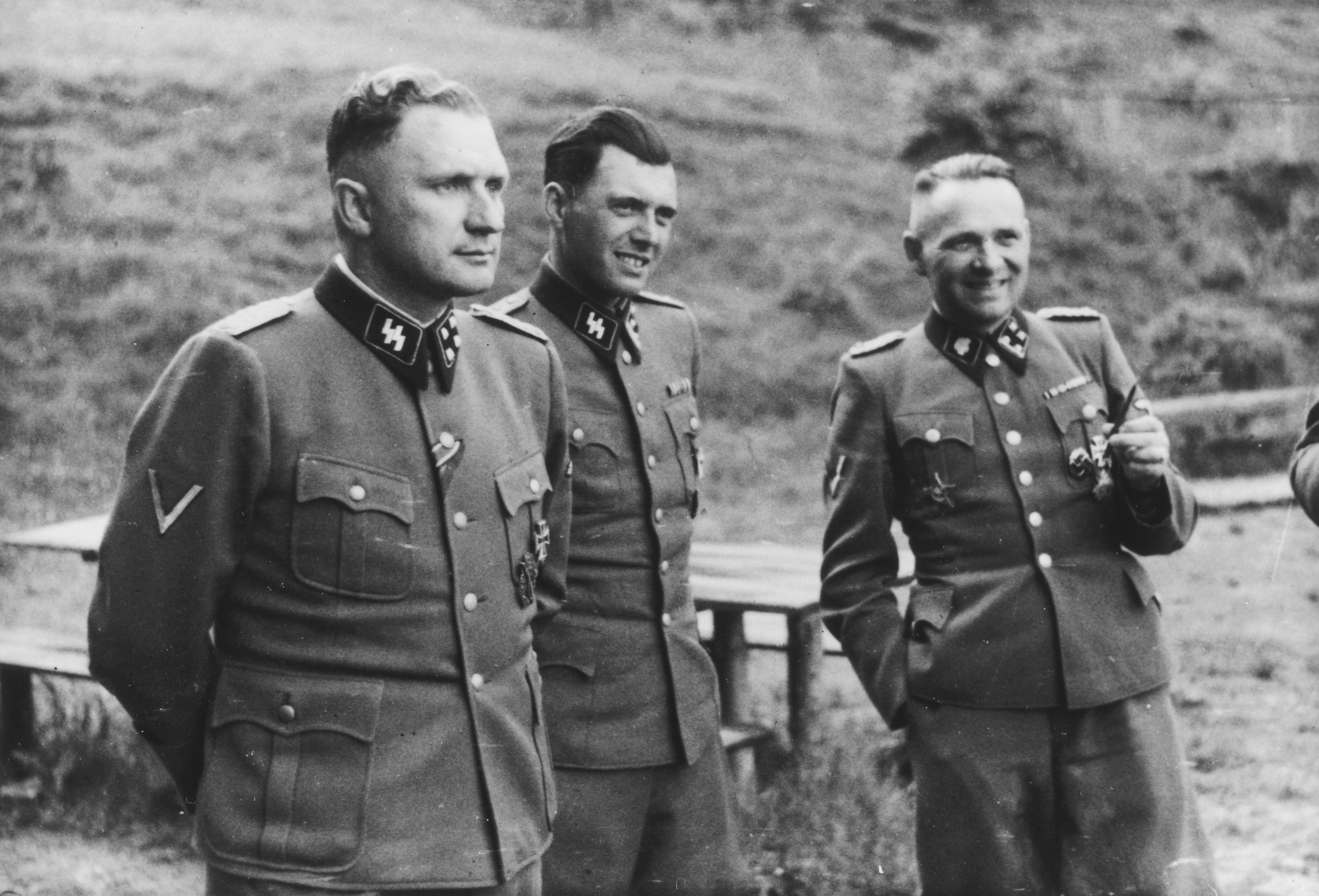
From left to right: Richard Baer, Josef Mengele and Rudolf Höss (1944)

From November 1943 until the end of 1944, Fritz Hartjenstein and Josef Kramer were responsible for the extermination camp in Auschwitz II-Birkenau, so Baer was only Commandant of that part of the camp from the end of 1944 until February 1945. Near the end of the war, having replaced Otto Förschner as commandant of the Mittelbau-Dora concentration camp in Nordhausen, Baer was responsible for the mass execution of Soviet prisoners by hanging. His final rank was SS-Sturmbannführer.

== Post-war ==
Baer returned to his home county at the end of the war and eventually settled near Hamburg, living as Carl Egon Neumann, a forestry worker at Dassendorf. In the course of investigation during the Frankfurt Auschwitz Trials, a warrant for his arrest was issued in October 1960 and his photograph was printed in newspapers.

The story of Baer's arrest is vividly recounted by Devin Pendas in his book The Frankfurt Auschwitz Trial. After seeing a wanted picture in the tabloid newspaper Bild-Zeitung, a co-worker on Fürst von Bismarck's estate reported that Baer was working as a forester there. When officials confronted "Neumann" on the early morning of 20 December 1960, he at first denied everything. Having already addressed Baer as her "husband", the woman in the house subsequently gave her name as "Frau Baer", but still claimed that Baer was named "Neumann". However, Baer finally admitted his true identity. On the advice of his lawyer, Baer refused to testify. He died of a heart attack while in pre-trial detention in 1963.

== See also ==
- Höcker Album
