= Berlin Document Center =

Coordinates: 52.431°N 13.299°E

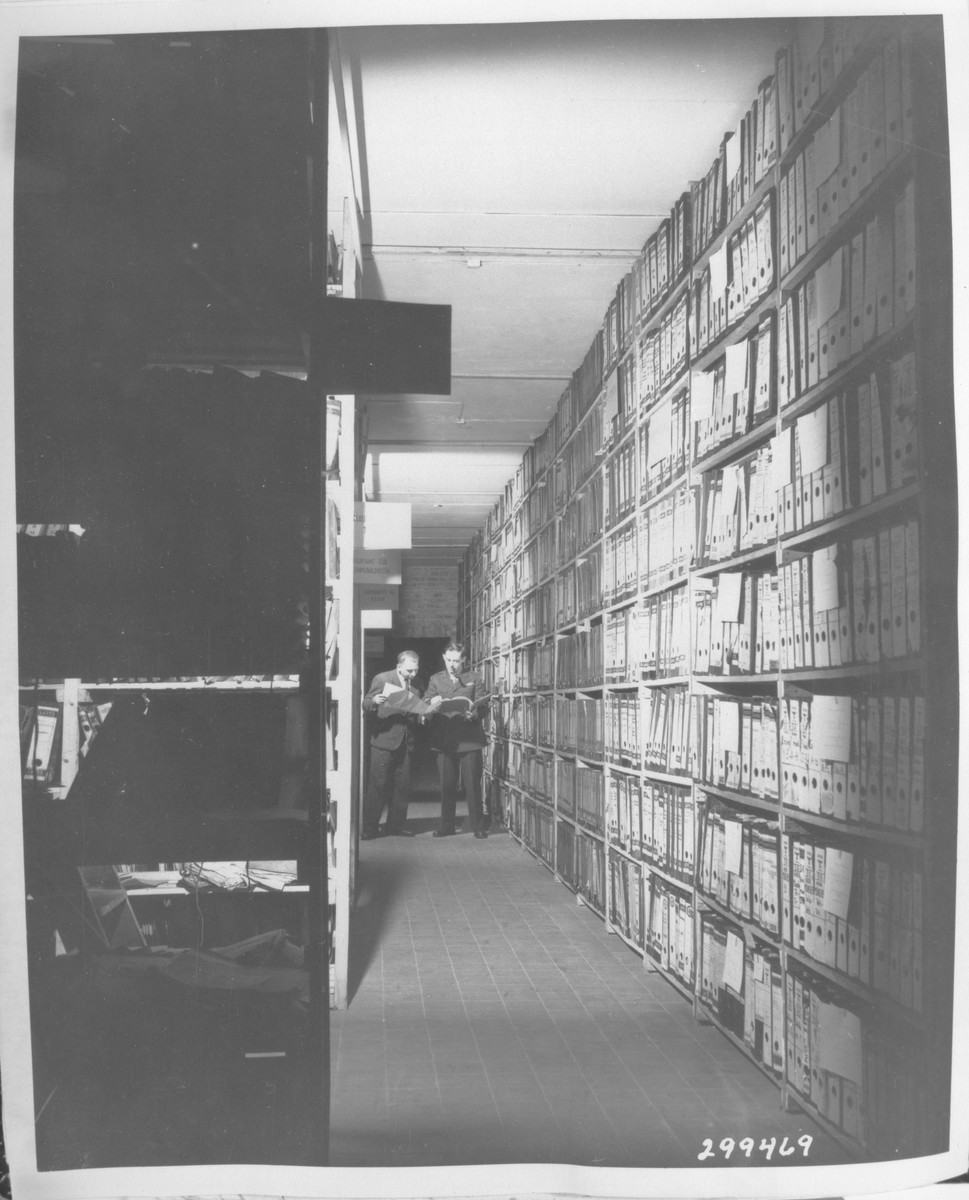
Two American researchers at the Berlin Document Center in 1947

The Berlin Document Center (BDC) was created in Berlin, Germany, after the end of World War II. Its task was to centralize the collection of documents from the time of Nazism, which were needed for the preparation of the Nuremberg Trials against war criminals. The BDC was under American administration until 1994, when the German Federal Archives (Bundesarchiv) was allowed to take control of the BDC. While the paper records remained in Germany, the entire collection was microfilmed and made available at the National Archives in Washington, DC, where researchers have much better access unhindered by restrictive German privacy laws now in effect in Berlin.

The files were rescued from destruction in May 1945 when they were discovered by U.S. Counter Intelligence Corps (CIC) Agents at a paper mill in Freimann, Germany, where they had been shipped by the Nazi leadership to be pulped.

== Inventory ==
- Central index of members of the NSDAP, 10.7 million record cards (90%)
- 60% of the personnel files of the SS, around 600,000
- 500,000 files from the 'Main Department of Race and Settlement' (Rasse- und Siedlungs-Hauptamt) of the SS
- 1.5 million party correspondences
- Several 100,000s of personal files of the SA, the NS-Teacher Alliance (NS-Lehrerbund, the NS-Alliance of German Technicians (NS Bund Deutscher Techniker) and other NS organisations
- Information on over 2.5 million Volksdeutsche
- Files of the Reich Chamber of Culture & Music, the Volksgerichtshof and of Gestapo offices

Under certain circumstances and with legitimation, it is possible to gain access to the files.

== Literature ==
- Babett Stach: Personenbezogene Unterlagen aus der Zeit des Nationalsozialismus. Das Bundesarchiv in Berlin und seine Bestände, insbesondere des ehemaligen amerikanischen Berlin Document Center (BDC). In: Herold-Jahrbuch N.F. 5 (2000), 149–186.
- Stefan Heym: Eine wahre Geschichte. In: Ders. (Hrsg.): Die Kannibalen und andere Erzählungen. Leipzig 1953, 51–76.
- Robert Wolfe: A Short History of the Berlin Document Center. In: The Holdings of the Berlin Document Center. A Guide to the Collections. Berlin 1994, XI-XXII.

== See also ==
- Research Materials: Max Planck Society Archive
