= Josef Mengele =

Nazi SS doctor at Auschwitz (1911–1979)

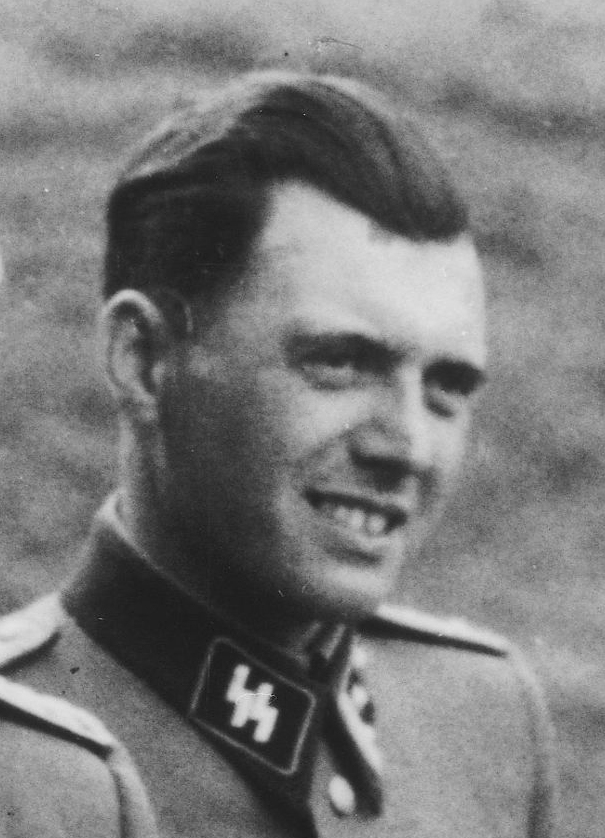
- Mengele at Solahütte in 1944
- Born: 16 March 1911; Günzburg, Germany
- Died: 7 February 1979 (aged 67); Bertioga, São Paulo, Brazil
- Education: University of Bonn; Ludwig-Maximilians-Universität München (PhD); Goethe University Frankfurt (MD)
- Spouses: Irene Schönbein (m. 1939; div. 1954) Martha Mengele (m. 1958)
- Children: 1
- Military career
- Allegiance: Nazi Germany
- Branch: Schutzstaffel
- Service years: 1938–1945
- Rank: SS-Hauptsturmführer (captain)
- Nicknames: Angel of Death (German: Todesengel); White Angel (German: der weiße Engel or weißer Engel); Wolfgang Gerhard (burial name)
- Service number: Nazi Party #5,574,974; SS #317,885
- Awards: Iron Cross First Class; Iron Cross Second Class; War Merit Cross, 2nd class with Swords; Black Badge for the Wounded; Medal for the Care of the German People

Josef Mengele (German: [ˈjoːzɛf ˈmɛŋələ]; 16 March 1911 – 7 February 1979), often dubbed the "Angel of Death" (German: Todesengel), was a German military officer and physician during World War II at the Eastern Front and then at Auschwitz during the Holocaust. He conducted research and experiments on prisoners at the Auschwitz II-Birkenau concentration camp, where he was a member of the team of doctors who selected victims to be murdered in the gas chambers. (Note: New arrivals that were judged able to work were admitted into the camp, while those deemed unsuitable for labor were sent to the gas chambers.)

Before the war, Mengele received doctorates in anthropology and medicine, and he began a career as a researcher. He joined the Nazi Party in 1937 and the SS in 1938. He was assigned as a battalion medical officer at the start of World War II, then transferred to the Nazi concentration camps service in early 1943. He was assigned to Auschwitz, where he saw the opportunity to conduct genetic research on human subjects. With Red Army troops sweeping through German-occupied Poland, Mengele was transferred 280 kilometres (170 miles) away from Auschwitz to the Gross-Rosen concentration camp on 17 January 1945, ten days before the arrival of the Soviet forces at Auschwitz.

After the war, Mengele fled to Argentina in July 1949, assisted by a network of former SS members. He initially lived in and around Buenos Aires, but fled to Paraguay in 1959 and later Brazil in 1960, all while being sought by West Germany, Israel, and Nazi hunters such as Simon Wiesenthal, who wanted to bring him to trial. Mengele eluded capture despite extradition requests by the West German government and clandestine operations by the Israeli intelligence agency Mossad. He drowned in 1979 after suffering a stroke while swimming off the coast of Bertioga, and was buried under the false name of Wolfgang Gerhard. His remains were disinterred and positively identified by forensic examination in 1985 and DNA analysis in 1992.

== Early life ==
Mengele was born into a Catholic family in Günzburg, Bavaria, on 16 March 1911, the eldest of three sons of Karl and Walburga (née Hupfauer) Mengele. His younger brothers were Karl Jr. and Alois. Their father was the founder of the Karl Mengele & Sons company (later renamed Mengele Agrartechnik), which produced farming machinery. In 1915, the company expanded, and switched to producing military equipment such as specialized wagons for military transport and parts for deploying naval mines. Karl joined the Nazi Party in 1933 and the SS in 1935, primarily as a way to advance his career in local politics. He served as a district economic advisor, and was found during denazification proceedings after World War II to have not been a committed Nazi.

Mengele was successful at school and developed an interest in music, art, and skiing. In 1924, he joined the Greater German Youth League, a right-wing youth group, and remained a member until 1930, serving as leader of the local chapter from 1927. He completed secondary school in April 1930 and went on to study medicine at the Ludwig-Maximilians-Universität München. After two semesters, he switched to the University of Bonn, where he took his medical preliminary examination. In 1931, he joined Der Stahlhelm, Bund der Frontsoldaten, a paramilitary organization that was absorbed into the Nazi Sturmabteilung ('Storm Detachment'; SA) in 1934. He spent part of 1933 studying at the University of Vienna, and earned his PhD in anthropology from the Ludwig-Maximilians-Universität München in 1935, studying for four years under Theodor Mollison, a physical anthropologist and proponent of the pseudoscience of scientific racism. Mengele's dissertation, titled Rassenmorphologische Untersuchung des vorderen Unterkieferabschnittes bei vier rassischen Gruppen ("Racial morphological study of the anterior segment of the mandible in four racial groups"), attempted to prove that measurements of the lower jaw could be used to determine race.

In January 1937, he joined the Institute for Hereditary Biology and Racial Hygiene at Goethe University Frankfurt, where he worked for Otmar Freiherr von Verschuer, a German geneticist with a particular interest in researching twins. As Verschuer's assistant, Mengele focused on the genetic factors that result in a cleft lip and palate or a cleft chin. His thesis on the subject earned him a cum laude doctorate in medicine (MD) from Goethe University Frankfurt in 1937. (Note: Mengele's degrees from the Ludwig-Maximilians-Universität München and the University of Frankfurt am Main were revoked by the issuing universities in the 1960s.) In a letter of recommendation, Verschuer praised Mengele's reliability and his ability to verbally present complex material clearly. (Note: The American author Robert Jay Lifton notes that Mengele's published works were in keeping with the scientific mainstream of the time, and would probably have been viewed as valid scientific efforts even outside Nazi Germany.) In 1938, he hired him as a permanent assistant at his institute. As part of his duties, he assessed the racial heritage of applicants for the Aryan certificate, a document required before a person could qualify for government jobs or German citizenship.

On 28 July 1939, Mengele married Irene Schönbein, whom he had met while working as a medical resident in Leipzig. Their only child, a son they named Rolf, was born in 1944.

== Military career ==
Mengele joined the Nazi Party in 1937 and the Schutzstaffel (SS) in 1938. He received basic training in 1938 with the Gebirgsjäger (mountain light infantry) and was called up for service in the Wehrmacht (German armed forces) in June 1940, some months after the outbreak of World War II. He soon volunteered for medical service in the Waffen-SS, the combat arm of the SS, where he served with the rank of SS-Untersturmführer (second lieutenant) in a medical reserve battalion until November 1940. He was next assigned to the SS Race and Settlement Main Office in Poznań, where one of his assignments was evaluating candidates for Germanization.

At the end of 1940, Mengele was assigned to the engineering battalion of the 5th SS Panzer Division Wiking, initially as an assistant medical officer and as the primary medical officer from October 1941. His unit was sent to the Ulm area for training in April 1941 and then to an area southeast of Lublin to await the commencement of Operation Barbarossa, the German invasion of the Soviet Union. The unit crossed into Ukraine on 30 June. On 2 July, the commander of the division's Westland Regiment was killed by a sniper. In response, members of the Wiking Division killed several thousand Jews. This was the beginning of a pogrom by the Wiking Division that continued into Zolochiv and nearby areas until 4 July. German historian Kai Struve estimates the total number of Jewish civilians killed by the Wiking Division in their first week of action during Barbarossa at 4,280 to 6,950 people. Historian David G. Marwell states that while Mengele did not participate in these killings, he must have known what was taking place. Mengele was awarded the Iron Cross 2nd Class on 14 July for bravery. The unit continued to see action in Ukraine and Russia as part of Case Blue (June to November 1942) and was ordered to move towards Stalingrad in late December.

After rescuing two German soldiers from a burning tank, Mengele was decorated with the Iron Cross 1st Class, the Wound Badge in Black, and the Medal for the Care of the German People. In mid-1942, he was seriously wounded in action near Rostov-on-Don and declared unfit for further active service. Following his recovery, he was transferred to the headquarters of the SS Race and Settlement Main Office in Berlin. He was promoted to the rank of SS-Hauptsturmführer (captain) in April 1943. For four months in early 1943, he again worked as an assistant to Verschuer, who was now at the Kaiser Wilhelm Institute of Anthropology, Human Heredity, and Eugenics in Berlin.

== Auschwitz ==
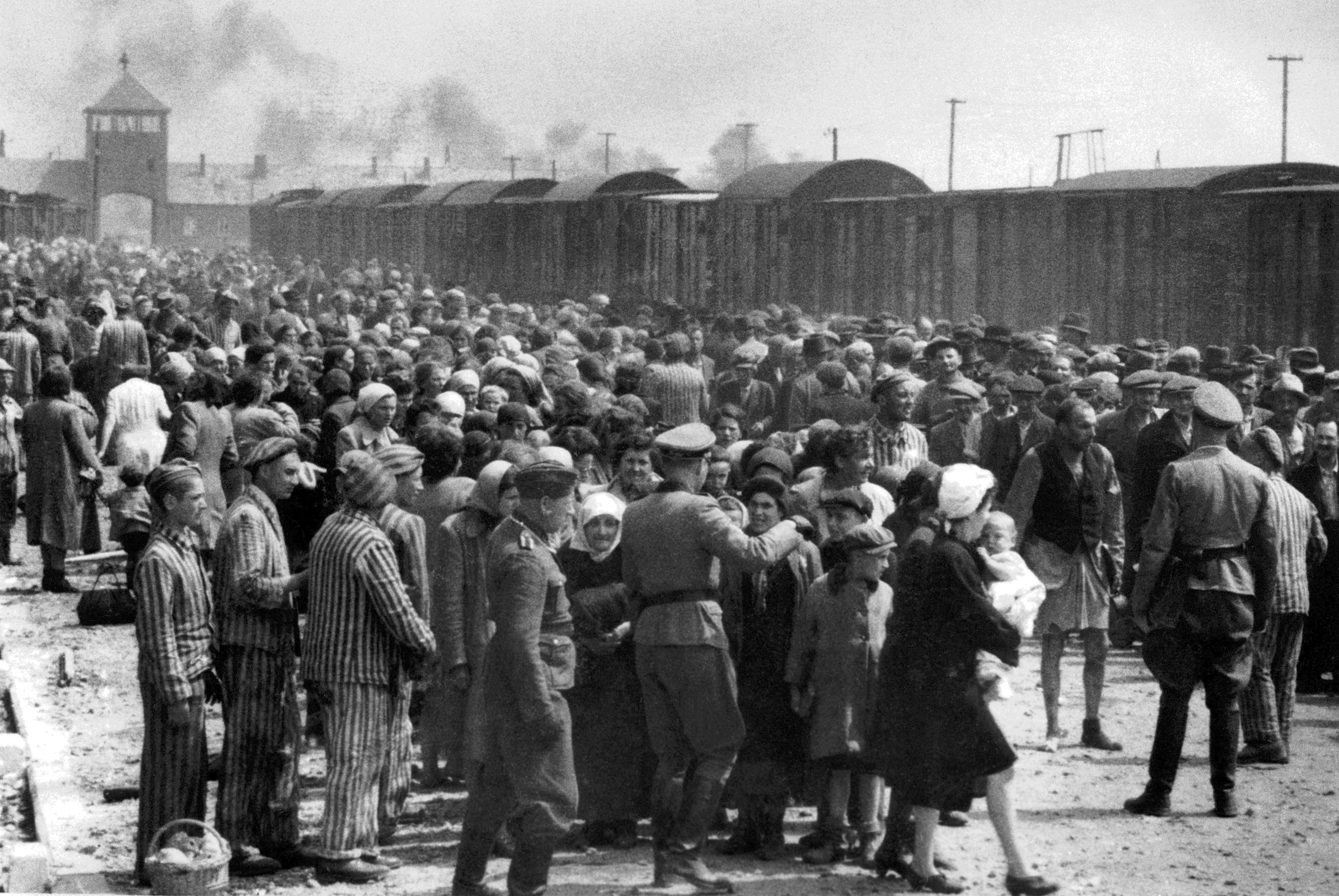
Selection of Hungarian Jews on the ramp at Birkenau, May/June 1944

In 1942, Auschwitz II-Birkenau, originally intended to house slave laborers, began to be used instead as a combined labour camp and extermination camp. Prisoners were transported there daily by rail from all over Nazi-controlled Europe. By July 1942, SS doctors were conducting selections where incoming Jews were segregated, and those considered able to work were admitted into the camp while those deemed unfit for labor were immediately murdered in the gas chambers. Those selected to be killed, about three-quarters of the total, (Note: Of the Hungarians who arrived in mid-1944, 85 percent were murdered immediately.) included almost all children, women with small children, pregnant women, all the elderly, and all of those who appeared (in a brief and superficial inspection by an SS doctor) to be not completely fit and healthy.

In early 1943, Verschuer encouraged Mengele to apply for a transfer to the concentration camp service. Mengele's application was accepted and he was posted to Auschwitz in May 1943, where he was appointed by SS-Standortarzt Eduard Wirths, chief medical officer at Auschwitz, to the position of chief physician of the Romani family camp at Auschwitz II-Birkenau. The SS doctors did not administer medical treatment to the Auschwitz inmates, but supervised the activities of inmate doctors forced to work in the camp medical service. As part of his duties, Mengele was one of the doctors who made weekly visits to the hospital barracks and ordered any prisoners who had not recovered after two weeks in bed to be sent to the gas chambers.

Mengele's work also involved carrying out "selections": sorting the newly-arrived inmates into two groups: those who would be admitted to the camp, and those who would be killed immediately. He would sometimes visit the selection ramp when not on duty in the hope of locating sets of twins for his experiments. He also looked for physicians, pharmacists, and other medical professionals who could potentially assist him in his research. In contrast to most of the other SS doctors, who viewed selections as one of their most stressful and unpleasant duties, he undertook the task with a flamboyant air, often smiling or whistling. He was one of the SS doctors responsible for supervising the administration of Zyklon B, the cyanide-based pesticide that was used for the mass killings in the Birkenau gas chambers. He served in this capacity at the gas chambers located in crematoria IV and V.

When a typhus epidemic began in the women's camp, Mengele cleared one block of six hundred Jewish women and sent them to be killed in the gas chambers. The building was then cleaned and disinfected, and the occupants of a neighboring block were bathed, deloused, and given new clothing before being moved into the clean block. This process was repeated until all of the barracks were disinfected. Similar killings and disinfections were used for later epidemics of scarlet fever, measles, and other diseases. For these actions, Mengele was awarded the War Merit Cross (Second Class with swords) and was promoted in 1944 to First Physician of the Birkenau subcamp.

=== Human experimentation and research ===
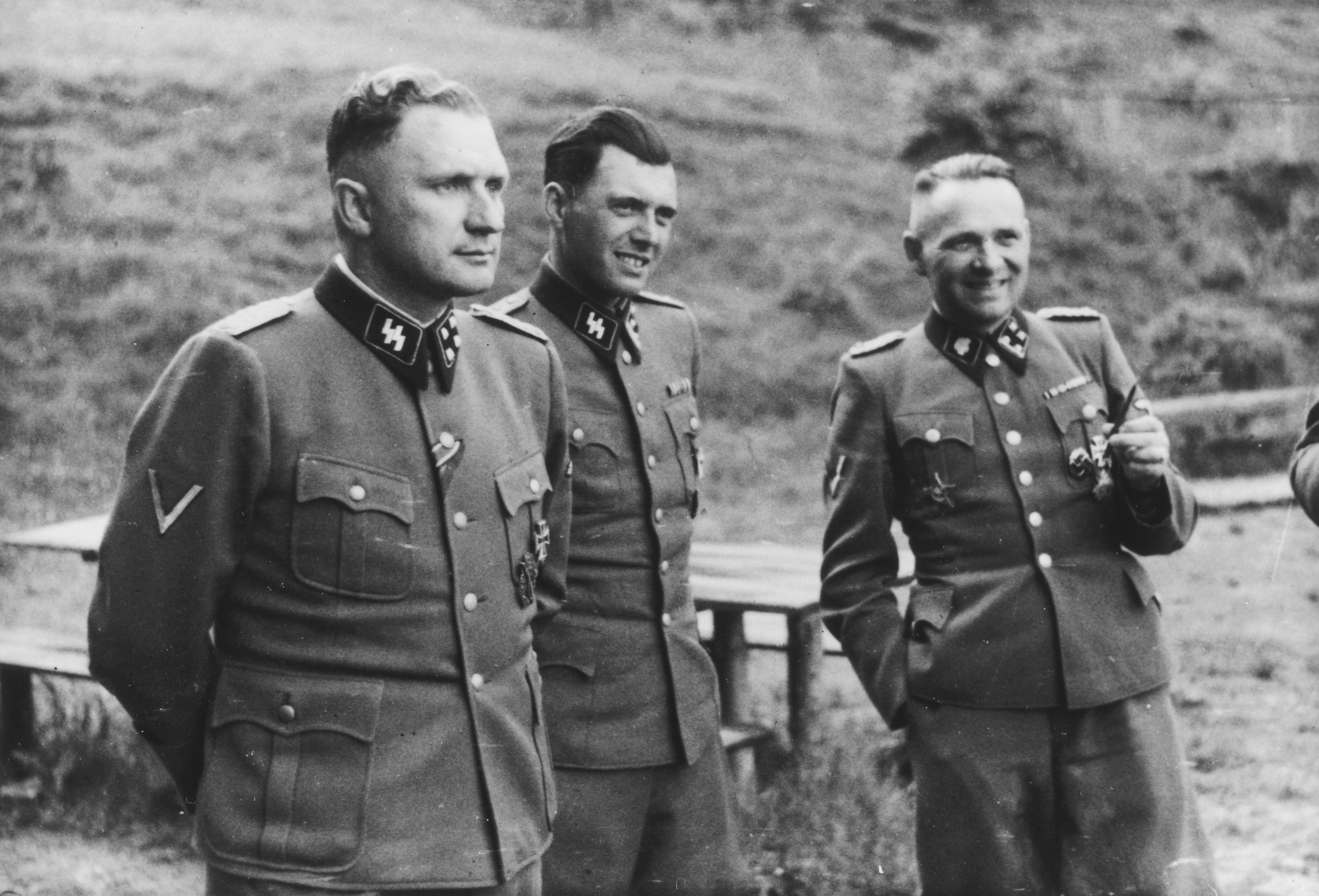
(from l. to r.) Richard Baer, Josef Mengele, and Rudolf Höss at Solahütte in 1944 (Höcker Album)

Mengele used Auschwitz as an opportunity to continue his anthropological studies and research into heredity, using inmates for medical experimentation. For this purpose, he set up his research facility in the Romani family camp. He was particularly interested in identical twins, people with heterochromia iridum (eyes of two different colors), people with dwarfism, and people with physical abnormalities. He also studied blood proteins, did anthropological studies of the Romani population, and collected specimens for forwarding to the SS Medical Academy in Graz. A grant was provided by the German Research Foundation at the request of Verschuer, who received regular reports and shipments of specimens from Mengele. The grant was used to build a pathology laboratory attached to Crematorium II at Auschwitz II-Birkenau. Miklós Nyiszli, who was forced to work on Mengele's behalf due to his pathologist background, prepared specimens and performed autopsies for this laboratory.

When an outbreak of noma—a gangrenous bacterial disease of the mouth and face—struck the Romani camp in 1943, Mengele initiated a study to determine the cause of the disease and develop a treatment. He enlisted the assistance of prisoner Berthold Epstein, a Jewish pediatrician and professor at Prague University. The patients were isolated in separate barracks. The treatment involved administering vitamins and antibiotics to afflicted children, who saw significant improvement. However, once he was satisfied that it was effective, he discontinued treatment, and the children immediately fell ill again. The preserved heads and organs of several afflicted children were sent to the SS Medical Academy in Graz and other facilities for study. This research was still ongoing when the Romani camp was liquidated and its remaining occupants murdered in 1944.

In his search for genetic markers to indicate race, Verschuer had Mengele provide him with blood samples from around 200 racially diverse Auschwitz prisoners. The hypothesis was that each race had unique proteins that could be identified by laboratory testing. Most of the documentation from these experiments has not survived.

Twin research was of particular interest to Mengele. One twin could serve as a subject with the other as the control. Mengele viewed the opportunity to undertake twin research at Auschwitz as unique, as it is normally difficult to locate and study a significant number of subjects. The research was conducted on behalf of the Kaiser Wilhelm Institute of Anthropology and the German Research Foundation. Most of the twins he studied were children between the ages of two and sixteen. Historian Nikolaus Wachsmann estimates Mengele may have studied as many as a thousand sets of twins. Some were siblings who passed themselves off as twins to avoid being killed. The research largely involved taking dozens of physical measurements and recording the characteristics of various anatomical features. Each examination could take several hours. Mengele generally ordered the twins to undertake weekly physical examinations. Nyiszli and others suggested that twin studies may have been pursued to uncover strategies for 'racially desirable' Germans to produce more twins. The actual purpose of Mengele's twin research is unknown.

In his 1945 deposition, Nyiszli testified that he watched Mengele kill 14 twins in a single night, first by injecting evipan to induce sleep, and then by injecting their hearts with chloroform. Nyiszli described it differently in his book; there, he said that he smelled chloroform in the hearts of twins he dissected. He added that he feared Mengele might have him killed for knowing this secret.

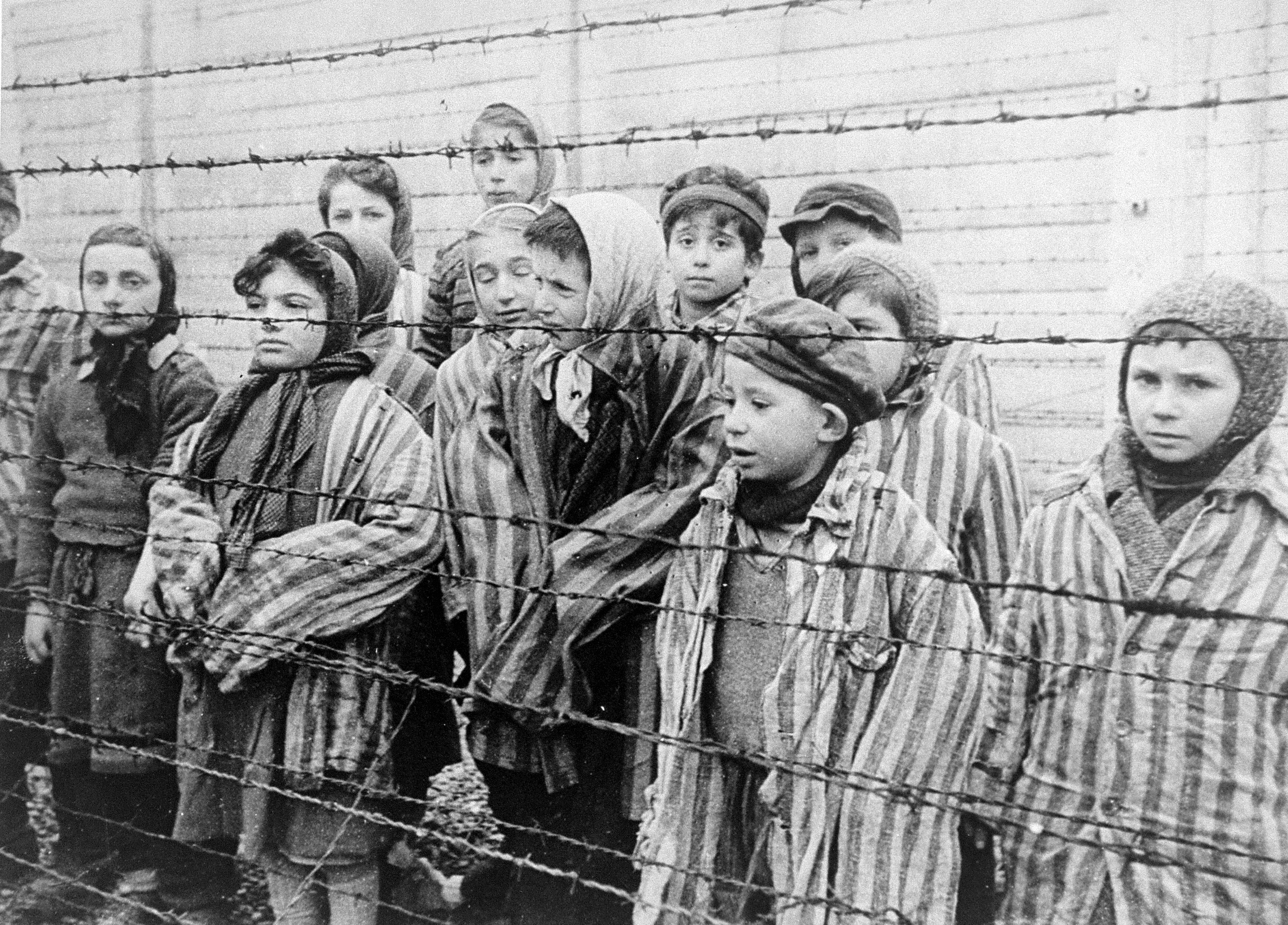
Jewish children kept alive in Auschwitz for use in Mengele's research. They were liberated in January 1945.

Mengele's research subjects were better fed and housed than the other prisoners, and temporarily spared from death in the gas chambers. His research subjects lived in their own barracks, where they were provided with a marginally better quality of food and somewhat improved living conditions than other areas of the camp. When visiting his young subjects, he offered them sweets. Some children referred to him as "Uncle Mengele".

A former Auschwitz inmate doctor said of Mengele:

He was capable of being so kind to the children, to have them become fond of him, to bring them sugar, to think of small details in their daily lives, and to do things we would genuinely admire ... And then, next to that, ... the crematoria smoke, and these children, tomorrow or in a half-hour, he is going to send them there. Well, that is where the anomaly lay.

Mengele's eye research involved introducing chemicals or hormones into the eyes of subjects. Although there has been speculation that Mengele was attempting to "Aryanize" prisoners' eyes by making them blue with dyes or other chemicals, this idea has been rejected by Marwell. He argues that Mengele would not be interested in a "cosmetic change" with "no genetic meaning". According to Marwell, Mengele was most likely administering adrenaline drops into the eyes of subjects while researching the condition heterochromia (color differences of the iris), as part of his collaboration with biologist and eugenicist Karin Magnussen, who carried out Reich-funded research on eye color at the Kaiser Wilhelm Institute for Anthropology in Berlin. Magnussen was testing whether drugs or hormones such as adrenaline could alter pigmentation of the eyes of rabbits, as well as studying the anatomy of the eye and the genetics underlying heterochromia.

Mengele's collaboration with Magnussen also included compiling genealogical records and documenting the eye characteristics of prisoners. He sent eyes removed from Auschwitz prisoners to her lab in Berlin for histological study. After the war, Magnussen stated she believed that the specimens were from prisoners who had died of natural causes. The inmate pathologist, Nyiszli, said that some of the samples were from the bodies of people who had been killed by lethal injection.

=== Myths and apocryphal anecdotes ===
Some testimonies regarding Mengele have been rejected or challenged by historians, including the claim that Mengele sewed two twins together to create conjoined twins. Agnieszka Kita, a historian at the Auschwitz-Birkenau State Museum, has described this as a myth. Marwell has rejected other stories about Mengele, including the suggestion that he surgically "connected the urinary tract of a 7-year-old girl to her own colon", or that he attempted to "make boys into girls and girls into boys" using "cross transfusions", or that he attempted to change people's eye color. According to historian Paul Weindling, a number of "reproductive, surgical and pharmacological experiments" have been misattributed to Mengele, but were actually conducted by other doctors.

== After Auschwitz ==
Along with several other Auschwitz doctors, Mengele transferred to Gross-Rosen concentration camp in Lower Silesia on 17 January 1945, taking with him two boxes of specimens and the records of his experiments at Auschwitz. Most of the camp medical records had already been destroyed by the SS by the time the Red Army liberated Auschwitz on 27 January. He was assigned as SS garrison physician on 5 February, but the camp was evacuated shortly thereafter, as the Soviet army arrived on 13 February. He and other camp personnel may have moved at this time to Reichenau concentration camp, located near Rychnov u Jablonce nad Nisou, or to one of the other Gross-Rosen subcamps. He later traveled westward to Žatec in Czechoslovakia, where he became part of a field hospital unit, which meant he could wear the uniform of a Wehrmacht officer rather than his SS uniform. He temporarily entrusted his incriminating documents to a nurse with whom he had developed a relationship. He and his unit then hurried west to avoid being captured by the Soviets, but were taken prisoners of war by the Americans in June 1945. Although Mengele was initially registered under his own name, he was not identified as being on the major war criminal list due to the disorganization of the Allies regarding the distribution of wanted lists, and the fact that he did not have the usual SS blood group tattoo. He had also developed a convincing backstory that did not include his SS background or his service at Auschwitz. He was released by the US military authorities at the end of July and obtained a false clearance certificate under the name "Fritz Ulmann", which he later altered to read "Fritz Hollmann".

After several months on the run (including a trip back to the Soviet-occupied area to recover his Auschwitz records), Mengele found work near Rosenheim as a farmhand. He was in contact with members of his family, including his brother and his wife. She pretended to outsiders that he was dead and talked to him about getting a divorce. He left Germany on 17 April 1949, convinced that his capture would mean a trial and death sentence. Assisted by a network of former SS members, he used the ratline to travel to Genoa, where he obtained a passport under the alias "Helmut Gregor", and sailed to Argentina in July 1949. His wife refused to accompany him, and they divorced by proxy in Düsseldorf in 1954.

== In South America ==
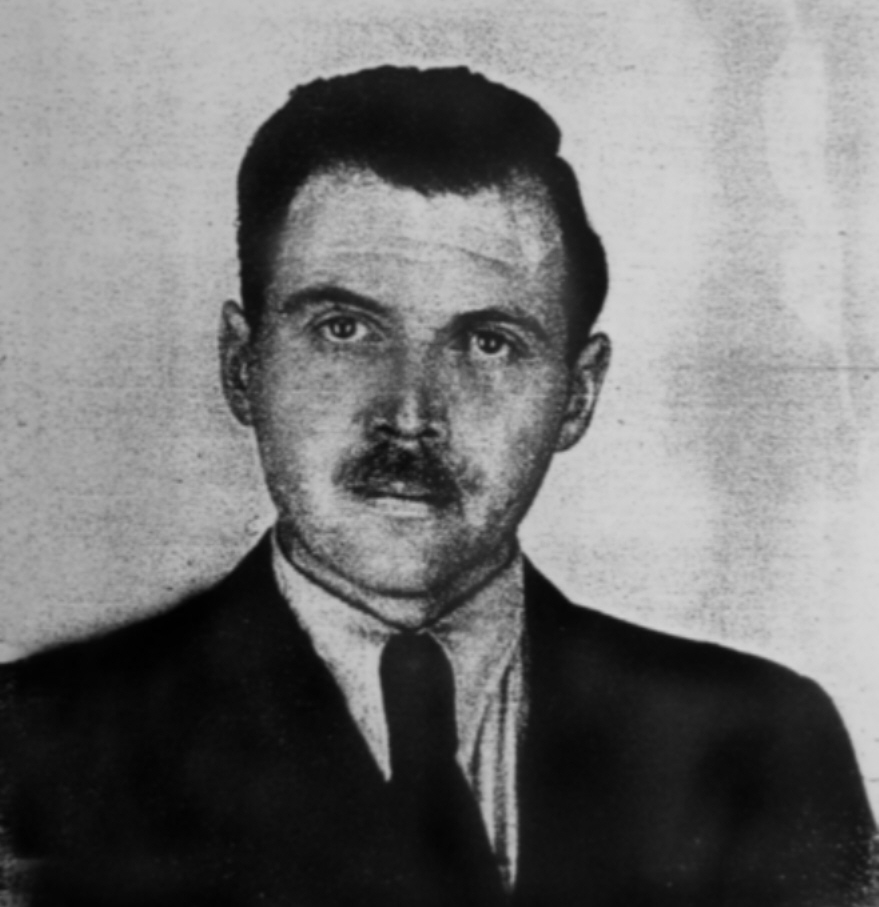
Photograph from Mengele's Argentine identification document in 1956

Mengele worked as a carpenter in Buenos Aires while lodging in a boarding house in the suburb of Vicente López. After a few weeks, he moved to the house of a Nazi sympathizer in the neighborhood of Florida Este. He next worked as a salesman for his family's farm equipment company, Karl Mengele & Sons, and in 1951, he began making frequent trips to Paraguay as a regional sales representative for the firm. He moved into an apartment in central Buenos Aires in 1953, used family funds to buy a part interest in a carpentry concern, and then rented a house in the suburb of Olivos in 1954. Files released by the Argentine government in 1992 indicate that while living in Buenos Aires, Mengele may have practiced medicine without a license, including performing abortions.

After obtaining a copy of his birth certificate through the West German embassy in 1956, Mengele was issued an Argentine foreign residence permit under his real name. He used this document to obtain a West German passport using his real name and embarked on a trip to Europe. He met with his son Rolf (who was told Mengele was his "Uncle Fritz") and his widowed sister-in-law Martha for a ski holiday in Switzerland. He also spent a week in his home town of Günzburg. When he returned to Argentina in September 1956, Mengele applied for and received an Argentinian identity card under the name José Mengele, a variation of his real name. Martha and her son Karl Heinz followed about a month later, and the three began living together. Josef and Martha were married in 1958 while on holiday in Uruguay, and they bought a house in Buenos Aires. Mengele's business interests now included part ownership of Fadro Farm, a pharmaceutical company. Along with several other doctors, he was questioned in 1958 on suspicion of practicing medicine without a license when a teenage girl died after an abortion, but he was released without charge. Aware that the publicity could lead to his Nazi background and wartime activities being discovered, he took an extended business trip to Paraguay on a 90-day visitor's permit issued 2 October 1958. He returned to Buenos Aires several times to settle his business affairs and visit his family. Martha and Karl lived in a boarding house in the city until December 1960, when they returned to West Germany. They later lived in Switzerland and Italy.

Mengele's name was mentioned several times during the Nuremberg trials in the mid-1940s, but the Allied forces believed that he was likely already dead. Irene Mengele and the family in Günzburg also claimed that he had died. Meanwhile, author Ernst Schnabel was forwarded a letter from a woman who read his 1958 book Anne Frank: A Portrait in Courage. She said a maid in the Mengele household had been told by Herr Mengele that his son was in South America, working as a doctor. Schnabel wrote to the state prosecutor in Ulm to pass along this information. The court in Freiburg issued an arrest warrant on 25 February 1959. That same month, Mengele may have traveled to West Germany to see his sick father.

Working in West Germany, Nazi hunters Simon Wiesenthal and Hermann Langbein collected information from witnesses about Mengele's wartime activities. In a search of public records, Langbein discovered Mengele's divorce papers, which listed an address in Buenos Aires. He and Wiesenthal pressured the West German authorities into starting extradition proceedings, and a second, revised arrest warrant that included data about Mengele's wartime activities was drawn up on 5 June 1959. West Germany also offered a reward for Mengele's capture, but did not actively search for him before the end of the year. Argentina initially refused the extradition request because the fugitive was no longer living at the address given on the documents; by the time extradition was approved on 30 June, Mengele had already fled to Paraguay and was living on a farm in Hohenau, near the Argentine border. Mengele reportedly worked as a veterinary surgeon under the alias of 'Francisco Fischer' while living in Hohenau.

In preparation for leaving Argentina, Mengele sold his shares of the Fadro Farm in March 1959 and granted Martha power of attorney to act on his behalf in legal matters. He moved to Paraguay sometime before May 1959 and received his citizenship under the name José Mengele. The extralegal capture of Adolf Eichmann in May 1960 meant that Paraguay's lack of any extradition treaties could no longer keep him safe. He decided to move to Brazil and live under an assumed name. With the help of Hans-Ulrich Rudel, he obtained an identity card with the name "Peter Hochbichler", and arrived in Brazil in October 1960.

After a request from Paraguayan Attorney General Clotildo Jiménez, the Supreme Court of Paraguay annulled Mengele's citizenship in August 1979.

Mengele stayed temporarily with Nazi supporter Wolfgang Gerhard on his farm near São Paulo. Gerhard helped Mengele cross the border into Brazil. In 1961, he relocated Mengele with Hungarian expatriates Géza and Gitta Stammer on their farm in Nova Europa. With the help of an investment from Mengele, he and the Stammers bought a coffee and cattle farm in Serra Negra in 1962, with Mengele owning a half interest. Gerhard had initially told the Stammers that the fugitive's name was "Peter Hochbichler", but they discovered his true identity in 1963. Gerhard persuaded the couple not to report Mengele's location to the authorities by convincing them that they themselves could be implicated for harboring a fugitive. By 1963, the Brazilian police requested the complete 100-page-long file on Mengele from the Argentinian authorities, which was seen by Mitteldeutscher Rundfunk journalists in 2025 but has not been released to the public.

=== Efforts by Mossad ===
In May 1960, Isser Harel, director of the Israeli intelligence agency Mossad, personally led the successful effort to capture Eichmann in Buenos Aires. He was hoping to track down Mengele so that he too could be brought to trial in Israel. Under interrogation, Eichmann provided the address of a boarding house that had been used as a safe house for Nazi fugitives. Surveillance of the house did not reveal Mengele or any members of his family, and the neighborhood postman claimed that although Mengele had recently been receiving letters there under his real name, he had since relocated without leaving a forwarding address. Harel's inquiries at a machine shop where Mengele had been a part owner also failed to generate any leads, so he was forced to abandon the search.

In February 1961, West Germany widened its extradition request to include Brazil, having been tipped off by Wiesenthal to the possibility that Mengele had relocated there. Meanwhile, Zvi Aharoni, one of the Mossad agents who had been involved in the Eichmann capture, was placed in charge of a team of agents tasked with tracking down Mengele and bringing him to trial in Israel. Their inquiries in Paraguay revealed no clues to his whereabouts, and they were unable to intercept any correspondence between Mengele and his wife, Martha, who by this time was living in Italy. Agents who were following Rudel's movements also failed to produce any leads. Aharoni and his team followed Gerhard to a rural area near São Paulo, where they identified a European man whom they believed to be Mengele. This potential breakthrough was reported to Harel, but the logistics of staging a capture, the budgetary constraints of the search operation, and the priority of focusing on Israel's deteriorating relationship with Egypt led the Mossad chief to call off the manhunt in 1962.

In 1964, Meir Amit, the new head of the Mossad, authorized a clandestine search of Martha Mengele's apartment in Bavaria. When they finally searched the premises in 1966, they found nothing to indicate she was currently in contact with Mengele. They tried again in May 1967, but again learned nothing specific. However, the contents of conversations monitored in Martha's home led them to believe that the two were still communicating. They decided to enlist the aid of Martha's boyfriend, a dentist named Siegfried Pereda. An Israeli agent posing as a patient visited his workplace to enlist his aid, but this line of inquiry produced no results either. The Mossad removed the listening devices from Martha's home on 27 October 1967, and an order calling for reduced efforts to catch Nazi war criminals was passed in Israel on 31 December 1968. No further investigations took place until 1977, when the government of Menachem Begin decided to resume the hunt for Nazis, and Mengele in particular. Operations included installing listening devices in the home of Mengele's son Rolf as well as contacting him in person to try to trick him into revealing his father's whereabouts, but again they obtained no information.

=== Later life and death ===
In 1969, Mengele and the Stammers jointly purchased a farmhouse in Caieiras, with Mengele as half-owner. When Wolfgang Gerhard returned to Germany in 1971 to seek medical treatment for his ailing wife and son, he gave his identity card to Mengele. The Stammers' friendship with Mengele deteriorated in late 1974, and when they bought a house in São Paulo, he was not invited to join them. (Note: Based on entries in Mengele's journals and interviews with his friends, historians such as Gerald Posner and Gerald Astor believe that Mengele had a sexual relationship with Gitta Stammer.) The Stammers later bought a bungalow in the Eldorado neighborhood of Diadema, São Paulo, which they rented out to Mengele. Rolf, who had not seen his father since the ski holiday in 1956, visited him at the bungalow in 1977; he found an "unrepentant Nazi" who claimed he had never personally harmed anyone and only carried out his duties as an officer.

Mengele's health had been steadily deteriorating since 1972. He suffered a stroke in 1976, experienced high blood pressure, and developed an ear infection which affected his balance. On 7 February 1979, while visiting his friends Wolfram and Liselotte Bossert in the coastal resort of Bertioga, Mengele had a second stroke while swimming and drowned. His body was buried in Our Lady of the Rosary cemetery in Embu das Artes under the name "Wolfgang Gerhard", whose identification Mengele had been using since 1971. Other aliases used by Mengele in his later life included "Dr. Fausto Rindón" and "S. Josi Alvers Aspiazu".

== Exhumation ==
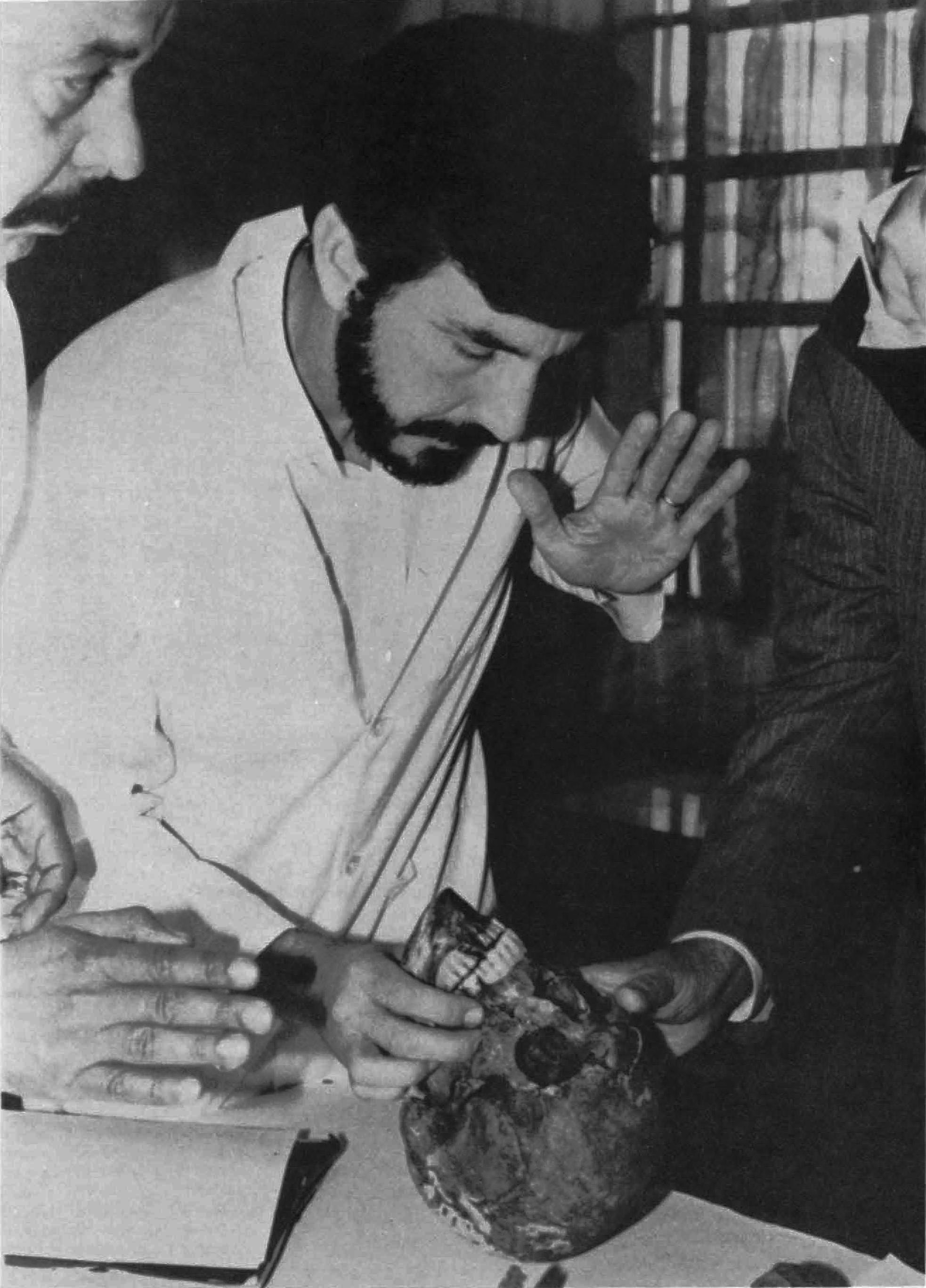
Forensic anthropologists examine Mengele's skull in 1986. The skeleton is stored at the São Paulo Institute for Forensic Medicine in Brazil.

Sightings of Mengele were reported all over the world in the decades following the war. Wiesenthal claimed to have information that placed Mengele on the Greek island of Kythnos in 1960, in Cairo in 1961, in Spain in 1971, and in Paraguay in 1978, eighteen years after he had left the country. In 1982, Wiesenthal offered a reward of US$100,000 (equivalent to $333,600 in 2025) for the fugitive's capture, and as late as 1985 claimed Mengele was still alive. Worldwide interest in the case was heightened by a mock trial held in Jerusalem in February 1985, featuring the testimonies of over one hundred victims of Mengele's experiments. Shortly afterwards, the West German, Israeli, and U.S. governments launched a coordinated effort to determine Mengele's whereabouts. The West German and Israeli governments offered rewards for his capture, as did The Washington Times and the Simon Wiesenthal Center.

On 31 May 1985, acting on intelligence received by the West German prosecutor's office, police raided the house of Hans Sedlmeier, a lifelong friend of Mengele and sales manager of the family firm in Günzburg. They found a coded address book and copies of letters sent to and received from Mengele. Among the papers was a letter from Wolfram Bossert notifying Sedlmeier of Mengele's death. German authorities alerted the police in São Paulo, who then contacted the Bosserts. Under interrogation, they revealed the location of Mengele's grave and the remains were exhumed on 6 June 1985. Extensive forensic examination indicated with a high degree of probability that the body was indeed that of Josef Mengele. Rolf Mengele stated on 10 June 1985 that the body was his father's and that news of his father's death had been concealed to protect people who had sheltered him.

In 1992, DNA testing confirmed Mengele's identity beyond doubt, but family members refused repeated requests by Brazilian officials to repatriate the remains to Germany. The skeleton is stored at the São Paulo Institute for Forensic Medicine, where it is used as an educational aid during forensic medicine courses at the University of São Paulo's medical school.

== Later developments ==
In 2007, the United States Holocaust Memorial Museum received as a donation the Höcker Album, an album of photographs of Auschwitz staff taken by Karl-Friedrich Höcker. Eight of the photographs include Mengele. In February 2010, a 180-page volume of Mengele's diary was sold by Alexander Autographs at auction for an undisclosed sum to the grandson of a Holocaust survivor. The unidentified previous owner, who acquired the journals in Brazil, was reported to be close to the Mengele family. A Holocaust survivors' organization described the sale as "a cynical act of exploitation aimed at profiting from the writings of one of the most heinous Nazi criminals". Rabbi Marvin Hier of the Simon Wiesenthal Center was glad to see the diary fall into Jewish hands, calling the acquisition significant. In 2011 (centenary of Mengele's birth), a further 31 volumes of Mengele's diaries were sold—again amidst protests—by the same auction house to an undisclosed collector of World War II memorabilia for US$245,000.

In 2026, after decades of unsuccessful requests for declassification, the Swiss Federal Intelligence Service announced that it would grant historians conditional access to long-sealed federal files relating to Mengele. The files concern suspicions that Mengele may have travelled through or stayed in Switzerland in the late 1950s and early 1960s, and were sealed until 2071 on grounds of national security and protection of the extended family. While researching Switzerland's role as a possible transit country for fugitive Nazis, historian Regula Bochsler discovered that Austrian intelligence warned Swiss authorities in June 1961 that Mengele might be on Swiss territory. Zurich police records showed that Mengele's wife had applied for permanent residency and rented an apartment near Zurich Airport, which was placed under police surveillance.

After being denied access to the archives, Historian Gérard Wettstein challenged the decision in court in 2025, arguing that the prolonged classification fuelled speculation regarding Switzerland’s postwar handling of fugitive Nazi war criminals. Historian Jakob Tanner noted the case reflects broader tensions in Switzerland between national security secrecy and historical transparency concerning the country’s wartime and postwar conduct.

== Publications ==
- Rassenmorphologische Untersuchung des vorderen Unterkieferabschnittes bei vier rassischen Gruppen ("Racial morphological study of the anterior segment of the mandible in four racial groups"). This dissertation, completed in 1935 and first published in 1937, earned him a PhD in anthropology from the Ludwig-Maximilians-Universität München. In this work, Mengele sought to demonstrate that there were structural differences in the lower jaws of individuals from different ethnic groups, and that racial distinctions could be made based on these differences.
- Sippenuntersuchungen bei Lippen-Kiefer-Gaumenspalte ("Kinship Examination in Cases of Cleft Lip, Jaw, and Palate"). His medical dissertation, published in 1938, earned him a doctorate in medicine from Goethe University Frankfurt. Studying the influence of genetics as a factor in the occurrence of this deformity, Mengele conducted research on families who exhibited these traits in multiple generations. The work also included notes on other abnormalities found in these family lines.
- Hereditary Transmission of Fistulae Auris. This journal article, published in Der Erbarzt ('The Genetic Physician'), focuses on fistula auris (an abnormal fissure on the external ear) as a hereditary trait. Mengele noted that individuals who have this trait also tend to have a dimple on their chin.

== See also ==
- Aribert Heim – Austrian SS doctor (1914–1992)
- Carl Clauberg – German gynaecologist and Auschwitz experimenter
- Shiro Ishii – Japanese biological weapons specialist (1892–1959)
- Eva Mozes Kor – Holocaust survivor (1934–2019)
- Hans Münch – German physician (1911–2001)
- Nazi eugenics – Nazi German policy of the murder of "undesirable" persons
- The Boys from Brazil – 1978 film by Franklin J. Schaffner
- The German Doctor – 2013 historical drama thriller film

== Bibliography ==
- Aderet, Ofer (22 July 2011). "Ultra-Orthodox man buys diaries of Nazi doctor Mengele for $245,000". Haaretz. Archived from the original on 20 January 2023.
- Allison, Kirk C. (2011). "Eugenics, race hygiene, and the Holocaust: Antecedents and consolidations". In Friedman, Jonathan C (ed.). Routledge History of the Holocaust. Milton Park; New York: Taylor & Francis. pp. 45–58. ISBN 978-0-415-77956-2.
- Astor, Gerald (1985). Last Nazi: Life and Times of Dr Joseph Mengele. New York: Donald I. Fine. ISBN 978-0-917657-46-7.
- Auschwitz Museum (9 December 2024). "Doctor Josef Mengele and his experiments in the camp (transcript of the podcast)". auschwitz.org.
- Belnap, David F. (10 August 1979). "Mengele Hunt Focuses on Paraguay". Washington Post.
- Bergmann, Christian; Narvaez, Luis (6 May 2025). "KZ-Lagerarzt Mengele – Geheime Akte in Argentinien aufgetaucht" [Concentration camp doctor Mengele – Secret files surface in Argentina: Manuscript] (in German). Mitteldeutscher Rundfunk.
- Blumenthal, Ralph (11 June 1985). "Investigators Turn Attention to Mengele Family Contacts". The New York Times.
- Blumenthal, Ralph (22 July 1985). "Scientists Decide Brazil Skeleton Is Josef Mengele". The New York Times.
- Brooke, James (1 June 1993). "Hohenau Journal; Sure, Mengele Was at Home Here, but Bormann?". The New York Times. New York.
- Eichner, Itamar (4 May 2026). "After Decades: Switzerland Approves Opening of Josef Mengele's Archive File". Ynetglobal.
- Encyclopedia Britannica (9 May 2025). "Josef Mengele". britannica.com.
- Evans, Richard J. (2008). The Third Reich at War. New York: Penguin. ISBN 978-0-14-311671-4.
- Foulkes, Imogen (15 May 2026). "Josef Mengele: Switzerland finally to open secret files on Nazis' Auschwitz 'Angel of Death'". www.bbc.com.
- Gibbs, Stephen (19 December 2024). "Shadow of Josef Mengele still hangs over his Paraguayan bolthole". The Times.
- Gopnik, Adam (15 June 2020). "Revisiting Mengele's Malignant "Race Science"". The New Yorker.
- Hier, Marvin (2010). "Wiesenthal Center Praises Acquisition of Mengele's Diary". Simon Wiesenthal Center. Archived from the original on 8 May 2017.
- Horovitz, David (26 January 2018). "Mossad chose not to nab Mengele, didn't hunt down Munich terrorists, book claims". Times of Israel.
- "In the Matter of Josef Mengele: A Report to the Attorney General of the United States" (PDF). US Department of Justice, Office of Special Investigations Criminal Division. October 1992. p. 208.
- Jaquet, Stéphanie (5 May 2026). "Le criminel nazi Josef Mengele a-t-il bel et bien séjourné en Suisse dans les années 1960?" [Did the Nazi criminal Josef Mengele actually stay in Switzerland in the 1960s?]. rts.ch (in French).
- Keystone SDA (5 May 2026). "Auschwitz Committee applauds opening of Mengele dossier". SWI swissinfo.ch.
- Kubica, Helena (1998) [1994]. "The Crimes of Josef Mengele". In Gutman, Yisrael; Berenbaum, Michael (eds.). Anatomy of the Auschwitz Death Camp. Bloomington, Indiana: Indiana University Press. pp. 317–337. ISBN 978-0-253-20884-2.
- Levy, Alan (2006) [1993]. Nazi Hunter: The Wiesenthal File (Revised 2002 ed.). London: Constable & Robinson. ISBN 978-1-84119-607-7.
- Lifton, Robert Jay (21 July 1985). "What Made This Man? Mengele". The New York Times. Archived from the original on 30 June 2020.
- Lifton, Robert Jay (1986). The Nazi Doctors: Medical Killing and the Psychology of Genocide. New York: Basic Books. ISBN 978-0-465-04905-9.
- Longerich, Peter (2010). Holocaust: The Nazi Persecution and Murder of the Jews. Oxford; New York: Oxford University Press. ISBN 978-0-19-280436-5.
- Marwell, David G. (2020). Mengele: Unmasking the "Angel of Death". New York: W. W. Norton & Company. ISBN 978-0-393-60953-0.
- Mengele, Josef (1938). "Sippenuntersuchungen bei Lippen-Kiefer-Gaumenspalte". Zeitschrift für menschliche Vererbungs- und Konstitutionslehre (in German). 23 (1): 17–42. ISSN 0375-5320.
- Montalbano, William D. (8 June 1985). "'Gerhard' Was Anxious, Feared Jews: Man Thought to Be Mengele Called Shy". Los Angeles Times.
- Nash, Nathaniel C. (11 February 1992). "Mengele an Abortionist, Argentine Files Suggest". The New York Times.
- Nyiszli, Miklós (1993) [1960]. Auschwitz: A Doctor's Eyewitness Account. New York: Arcade Publishing. ISBN 978-1-55970-202-7.
- Oster, Marcy (3 February 2010). "Survivor's grandson buys Mengele diary". Jewish Telegraphic Agency.
- Piper, Franciszek (1998) [1994]. "Gas Chambers and Crematoria". In Gutman, Yisrael; Berenbaum, Michael (eds.). Anatomy of the Auschwitz Death Camp. Bloomington, Indiana: Indiana University Press. pp. 157–182. ISBN 978-0-253-20884-2.
- Piper, Franciszek (2000). Długoborski, Wacław; Piper, Franciszek (eds.). Auschwitz, 1940–1945. Central Issues in the History of the Camp. Vol. III: Mass Murder. Oświęcim: Auschwitz-Birkenau State Museum. ISBN 978-8385047872. OCLC 929235229.
- Posner, Gerald L.; Ware, John (1986). Mengele: The Complete Story. New York: McGraw-Hill. ISBN 978-0-07-050598-8.
- Rees, Laurence (2005). Auschwitz: A New History. New York: Public Affairs. ISBN 978-1-58648-303-6.
- Saad, Rana (1 April 2005). "Discovery, development, and current applications of DNA identity testing". Baylor University Medical Center Proceedings. 18 (2): 130–133. doi:10.1080/08998280.2005.11928051. PMC 1200713. PMID 16200161.
- Segev, Tom (2010). Simon Wiesenthal: The Life and Legends. New York: Doubleday. ISBN 978-0-385-51946-5.
- Simons, Marlise (17 March 1988). "Remains of Mengele Rest Uneasily in Brazil". The New York Times.
- Šimůnek, Michal V. (2022). "Copenhagen 1938. J. Mengele and the 2nd International Congress of Anthropological and Ethnological Sciences". Annals of the History and Philosophy of Biology. 26: 103–121. doi:10.17875/gup2022-2023.
- Staff (2024). "Josef Mengele". United States Holocaust Memorial Museum.
- Staff (11 January 2017). "Nazi doctor Josef Mengele's bones used in Brazil forensic medicine courses". The Guardian. Associated Press.
- Staff (2007). "SS Auschwitz album". United States Holocaust Memorial Museum.
- Steinbacher, Sybille (2005) [2004]. Auschwitz: A History. Munich: Verlag C. H. Beck. ISBN 978-0-06-082581-2.
- Walters, Guy (2009). Hunting Evil: The Nazi War Criminals Who Escaped and the Quest to Bring Them to Justice. New York: Broadway Books. ISBN 978-0-7679-2873-1.
- Thornton, Larry (2006). "Mengele, Josef (1911–1979)". In Merriman, John; Winter, Jay (eds.). Europe Since 1914: Encyclopedia of the Age of War and Reconstruction. Detroit, Michigan: Charles Scribner's Sons. p. 1747. ISBN 0684314975.
- Wachsmann, Nikolaus (2015). KL: A History of the Nazi Concentration Camps. New York: Farrar, Straus and Giroux. ISBN 978-0-374-11825-9.
- Weindling, Paul (2002). "The Ethical Legacy of Nazi Medical War Crimes: Origins, Human Experiments, and International Justice". In Burley, Justine; Harris, John (eds.). A Companion to Genethics. Blackwell Companions to Philosophy. Malden, MA; Oxford: Blackwell. pp. 53–69. doi:10.1002/9780470756423.ch5. ISBN 978-0-631-20698-9.
- Zenthöfer, Jochen (23 May 2025). "MDR hält Akte zu Josef Mengele geheim" [MDR keeps Josef Mengele files secret] (in German). Frankfurter Allgemeine Zeitung.
- Zentner, Christian; Bedürftig, Friedemann (1991). The Encyclopedia of the Third Reich. New York: Macmillan. ISBN 978-0-02-897502-3.
