= Karl-Friedrich Höcker =

SS officer (1911–2000)

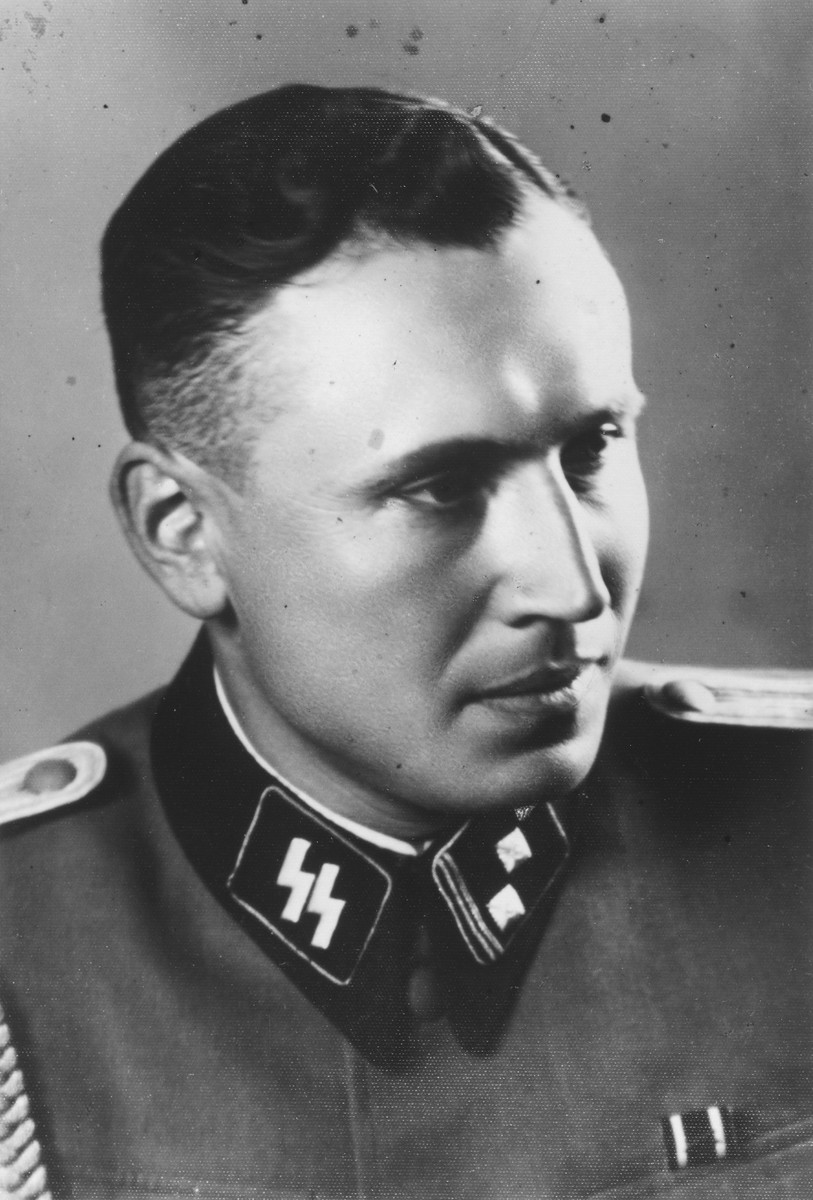
- Höcker in 1944
- Born: 11 December 1911; Engershausen, German Empire
- Died: 30 January 2000 (aged 88); Lübbecke, Germany
- Occupation: SS-Obersturmführer
- Political party: Nazi Party
- Awards: War Merit Cross 2nd Class With Swords SA-Sports Badge in Bronze DRL-Sports Badge in Bronze

Karl-Friedrich Höcker (11 December 1911 – 30 January 2000) was a Nazi war criminal, German commander in the SS and the adjutant to Richard Baer, who was a commandant of Auschwitz I concentration camp from May 1944 to December 1944. In 2006, a photo album created by Höcker (the Höcker Album), with some 116 pictures from his time at Auschwitz, was given to the United States Holocaust Memorial Museum, sparking new interest in his activities as a concentration camp administrator.

== Early life and family ==
The youngest of six children, Höcker was born in the village of Engershausen (now part of Preußisch Oldendorf), Germany. His father was a construction worker, who was later killed in action during World War I.

Following an apprenticeship as bank teller he worked at a bank in Lübbecke before being made redundant. After having been unemployed for two and a half years, he joined the SS in October 1933 and the Nazi Party in May 1937.

== Concentration camp administrator ==
On 16 November 1939 he joined the 9th SS Infantry Regiment based at Danzig and, in 1940, became the adjutant to the commanding SS officer of the Neuengamme concentration camp, Martin Gottfried Weiss. In 1942 Weiss was also the commanding officer of the Arbeitsdorf concentration camp with Höcker serving as his adjutant. Before being transferred in May 1943 to the Majdanek concentration camp, again as adjutant to Weiss, Höcker followed a course at the SS military academy (Junkerschule) in Braunschweig. During the same period he also received some military training.

In 1943, he became the adjutant to the commandant at Majdanek during the Operation Reinhardt mass deportations and murders. Afterward, he became adjutant to Richard Baer, in 1944, who was previously deputy to WVHA chief Oswald Pohl in Berlin. In May 1944 Höcker was transferred to Auschwitz, where he remained until the advance of the Soviet Red Army forced camp evacuation in January 1945. Thereafter, he was transferred to the Dora-Mittelbau concentration camp along with Baer. The two men administered the camp until the Allies arrived. Höcker used false papers to flee the camp and avoid being identified by the British when they captured him.

== Post-war trials ==
He married before the war and had a son and daughter during the war, with whom he was reunited after his release from 18 months in a British POW camp in 1946. Early in the 1960s he was apprehended by West German authorities in his hometown, where he was a bank official. It is not known why the bank rehired and promoted him after a long absence.

At his trial in Frankfurt, part of the noted Frankfurt Auschwitz Trials, Höcker denied having participated in the selection of victims at Birkenau or having ever personally executed a prisoner. He further denied any knowledge of the fate of the approximately 400,000 Hungarian Jews who were murdered at Auschwitz during his term of service at the camp. Höcker was shown to have knowledge of the genocidal activities at the camp, but could not be proved to have played a direct part in them. In post-war trials, Höcker denied his involvement in the selection process. While accounts from survivors and other SS officers all but placed him there, prosecutors could locate no conclusive evidence to prove the claim.

During his final statement at the Frankfurt Trial in 1965, he claimed: "I only learned about the events in Birkenau…in the course of time I was there… and I had nothing to do with that. I had no ability to influence these events in any way…neither did I want them, nor carry them out. I didn't hurt anybody… and neither did anyone die at Auschwitz because of me." Höcker testified that he never set foot on the ramp during the selection process, despite one survivor recalling an officer with the surname Höcker being present on the ramp.

In August 1965 Höcker was sentenced to seven years imprisonment for aiding and abetting in over 1,000 murders at Auschwitz. He was released in 1970 and was able to return to his bank post as a chief cashier, where he worked until his retirement.

On 3 May 1989 a district court in the German city of Bielefeld sentenced Höcker to four years imprisonment for his involvement in gassing murders of prisoners, primarily Polish Jews, in the Majdanek concentration camp in Poland. Camp records showed that between May 1943 and May 1944 Höcker had acquired at least 3,610 kilograms of Zyklon B poisonous gas for use in Majdanek from the Hamburg firm of Tesch & Stabenow.

Höcker died in 2000.

== Auschwitz photo album ==
In 2006, a photo album created by Höcker came to the attention of the United States Holocaust Memorial Museum; the album contains rare images of the life of German functionaries at Auschwitz while the camp remained in operation, including some of the few photos of Josef Mengele at Auschwitz.

== Sources ==
- U.S. Holocaust Memorial Museum photo gallery
- Lewis, Neil A. (September 18, 2007). "In the Shadow of Horror, SS Guardians Frolic". The New York Times.
- Karl Hoecker’s Album slideshow on The New Yorker's website
- "Nazi Scrapbooks from Hell", National Geographic Channel. November 30, 2008.
- Holocaust Survivors and Remembrance Project -- Karl Hoecker (Höcker)
- IMDB Page of Scrapbooks from Hell: The Auschwitz Albums (2008)
