= Nazi concentration camp commandant =

Chief commanding position within the SS service of a Nazi concentration camp

The commandant (German: KZ-Kommandant, Lagerkommandant) was the chief commanding position within the SS service of a Nazi concentration camp. He held the highest rank and was the most important member of the camp unit. The commandant directed the camp headquarters and was responsible for all issues of the Nazi concentration camp. The regulations of his duties and responsibilities came from the Concentration Camps Inspectorate (CCI).

Of utmost importance was his duty to ensure the safety of the camp. Therefore, all SS personnel were obliged to report to him any important incident about the camp. The commandant had to constantly stay in the camp; his absence for more than 24 hours required the consent of the Concentration Camps Inspectorate. In the event of an alarm caused by rebellion or escape, all personnel were subject to his command, and he had complete control of the issuance of orders and commands.

Another duty was to instruct subordinates about their tasks, camp security issues and the treatment of prisoners. He also watched over the affairs of the employment of prisoners, determining, among other things, working hours. The commandant was assigned an adjutant, or deputy commandant, who was responsible for the immediate, complete and accurate execution of the commandant's orders. Other SS personnel were subordinate to the deputy commandant. In the largest concentration camps, ranks of commandants ranged mostly from SS-Hauptsturmführer to SS-Obersturmbannführer.

The commandant had authority over all disciplinary matters affecting the SS personnel of the concentration camp. The individual departments within the concentration camp were under their respective parts of the Concentration Camps Inspectorate, but there were exceptions. The CCI directly supervised the Wachtruppe (guard unit), the adjutants and the Schutzhaftlagerführers.

== Nazi concentration camp locations and commandants ==
Camp	Commandant	Term			Ref.
Camp	Commandant	Beginning	End	Time	Ref.
Arbeitsdorf	Martin Gottfried Weiss	April 1942	July 1942	3 months	
Arbeitsdorf	Wilhelm Schitli	July 1942	October 1942	3 months	
Auschwitz I (Stammlager)	Rudolf Höss	4 May 1940	10 November 1943	3 years, 6 months	
Auschwitz I (Stammlager)	Arthur Liebehenschel	11 November 1943	8 May 1944	5 months	
Auschwitz I (Stammlager)	Richard Baer	11 May 1944	27 January 1945	8 months	
Auschwitz II (Birkenau)	Fritz Hartjenstein	22 November 1943	8 May 1944	5 months	
Auschwitz II (Birkenau)	Josef Kramer	8 May 1944	25 November 1944	6 months	
Auschwitz III (Monowitz)	Heinrich Schwarz	11 November 1943	17 January 1945	1 year, 2 months	
Bełżec	Christian Wirth	December 1941	August 1942	8 months	
Bełżec	Gottlieb Hering	August 1942	June 1943	10 months	
Bergen-Belsen	Adolf Haas	April 1943	2 December 1944	1 year, 8 months	
Bergen-Belsen	Josef Kramer	2 December 1944	15 April 1945	4 months	
Buchenwald	Karl-Otto Koch	July 1937	September 1941	4 years, 2 months	
Buchenwald	Hermann Pister	January 1942	13 April 1945	3 years, 3 months	
Dachau	Hilmar Wäckerle	19 April 1933	25 June 1933	3 months	
Dachau	Theodor Eicke	28 June 1933	10 December 1934	1 year, 5 months	
Dachau	Heinrich Deubel	10 December 1934	1 April 1936	1 year, 3 months	
Dachau	Hans Loritz	1 April 1936	19 February 1940	3 years, 10 months	
Dachau	Alexander Piorkowski	19 February 1940	1 September 1942	2 years, 6 months	
Dachau	Martin Gottfried Weiss	1 September 1942	31 October 1943	1 year, 1 month	
Dachau	Eduard Weiter	1 October 1943	26 April 1945	1 year, 6 months	
Flossenbürg	Jakob Weiseborn	May 1938	20 January 1939	8 months	
Flossenbürg	Karl Künstler	20 January 1939	10 August 1942	3 years, 6 months	
Flossenbürg	Karl Fritzsch	10 August 1942	October 1942	1 month	
Flossenbürg	Egon Zill	October 1942	29 April 1943	6 months	
Flossenbürg	Max Koegel	29 April 1943	23 April 1945	1 year, 11 months	
Gross-Rosen	Arthur Rödl	1 May 1941	15 September 1942	1 year, 4 months	
Gross-Rosen	Wilhelm Gideon	15 September 1942	10 October 1943	1 year	
Gross-Rosen	Johannes Hassebroek	11 October 1943	February 1945	1 year, 3 months	
Herzogenbusch	Karl Chmielewski	5 January 1943	October 1943	8 months	
Herzogenbusch	Adam Grünewald	October 1943	January 1944	3 months	
Herzogenbusch	Hans Hüttig	February 1944	September 1944	7 months	
Kovno	Wilhelm Göcke	September 1943	July 1944 (probably)	10 months	
Majdanek	Karl-Otto Koch	September 1941	August 1942	11 months	
Majdanek	Max Koegel	August 1942	November 1942	3 months	
Majdanek	Hermann Florstedt	November 1942	October 1943	11 months	
Majdanek	Martin Gottfried Weiss	November 1943	May 1944	6 months	
Majdanek	Arthur Liebehenschel	May 1944	22 July 1944	2 months	
Mauthausen-Gusen	Albert Sauer	8 August 1938	17 February 1939	6 months	
Mauthausen-Gusen	Franz Ziereis	17 February 1939	5 May 1945	6 years, 2 months	
Mittelbau-Dora	Otto Förschner	October 1944	January 1945	3 months	
Mittelbau-Dora	Richard Baer	February 1945	April 1945	2 months	
Natzweiler-Struthof	Hans Hüttig	April 1941	March 1942	11 months	
Natzweiler-Struthof	Egon Zill	May 1942	25 October 1942	5 months	
Natzweiler-Struthof	Josef Kramer	25 October 1942	4 May 1944	1 year, 6 months	
Natzweiler-Struthof	Fritz Hartjenstein	9 May 1944	January 1945	7 months	
Natzweiler-Struthof	Heinrich Schwarz	February 1945	April 1945	2 months	
Neuengamme	Walter Eisfeld	February 1940	March 1940	1 month	
Neuengamme	Martin Gottfried Weiss	April 1940	August 1942	2 years, 4 months	
Neuengamme	Max Pauly	September 1942	4 May 1945	2 years, 9 months	
Plaszow	Amon Göth	February 1943	13 September 1944	1 year, 7 months	
Plaszow	Arnold Büscher	September 1944	January 1945 (probably)	4 months	
Ravensbrück	Günther Tamaschke	May 1939	August 1939	3 months	
Ravensbrück	Max Koegel	January 1940	August 1942	2 years, 7 months	
Ravensbrück	Fritz Suhren	1 September 1942	30 April 1945	2 years, 7 months	
Riga-Kaiserwald	Eduard Roschmann	April 1943	September 1944	1 year, 5 months	
Sachsenhausen	Michael Lippert	July 1936	October 1936	3 months	
Sachsenhausen	Karl-Otto Koch	October 1936	July 1937	9 months	
Sachsenhausen	Hans Helwig	1 August 1937	April 1938	8 months	
Sachsenhausen	Hermann Baranowski	1 May 1938	September 1939	1 year, 4 months	
Sachsenhausen	Walter Eisfeld	September 1939	January 1940	5 months	
Sachsenhausen	Hans Loritz	1 April 1940	September 1942	2 years, 5 months	
Sachsenhausen	Anton Kaindl	September 1942	22 April 1945	2 years, 7 months	
Sobibór	Franz Stangl	28 April 1942	30 August 1942	4 months	
Sobibór	Franz Reichleitner	1 September 1942	17 October 1943	1 year, 1 month	
Stutthof	Max Pauly	October 1939	August 1942	2 years, 10 months	
Stutthof	Paul-Werner Hoppe	August 1942	April 1945	2 years, 8 months	
Treblinka	Irmfried Eberl	11 July 1942	26 August 1942	1 month	
Treblinka	Franz Stangl	1 September 1942	August 1943	11 months	
Treblinka	Kurt Franz	August 1943	November 1943	3 months	
Vaivara	Hans Aumeier	September 1943	June 1944	9 months	
Warsaw	Wilhelm Göcke	June 1943	September 1943	3 months	
Warsaw	Nikolaus Herbet	September 1943	July 1944 (probably)	10 months	

== See also ==
- Concentration Camps Inspectorate

== Bibliography ==
- Friedrich Karl Kaul, Joachim Noak (ed.): Angeklagter Nr. 6: Eine Auschwitzdokumentation. Akademie-Verlag, Berlin 1966.
- Martin Weinmann (ed.): Das nationalsozialistische Lagersystem (CCP). Zweitausendeins, Frankfurt am Main 1990.
- Wolfgang Sofsky: Die Ordnung des Terrors. Das Konzentrationslager. S. Fischer, Frankfurt am Main 1993 ISBN 3-10-072704-5.
- Karin Orth: Die Konzentrationslager-SS. Deutscher Taschenbuch-Verlag, München 2004, ISBN 3-423-34085-1.
- Karin Orth: Das System der nationalsozialistischen Konzentrationslager. Pendo-Verlag, Zürich 202, ISBN 3-85842-450-1
- Peter Neitzke (ed.): Konzentrationslager Dokument F 321 für den Internationalen Militärgerichtshof Nürnberg. Zweitausendeins, Frankfurt am Main 2005, p. 334
- Tom Segev: Die Soldaten des Bösen. Zur Geschichte der KZ-Kommandanten. Rowohlt, Reinbek bei Hamburg 1995, ISBN 3-499-18826-0.
- Ernst Klee: Das Personenlexikon zum Dritten Reich: Wer war was vor und nach 1945. Fischer-Taschenbuch-Verlag, Frankfurt am Main 2005, ISBN 3-596-16048-0.
- Eugen Kogon: Der SS-Staat. Das System der deutschen Konzentrationslager, Alber, München 1946, zuletzt: Heyne, München 1995, ISBN 3-453-02978-X
