= Schutzhaftlagerführer =

Camp compound leader in Nazi concentration camps

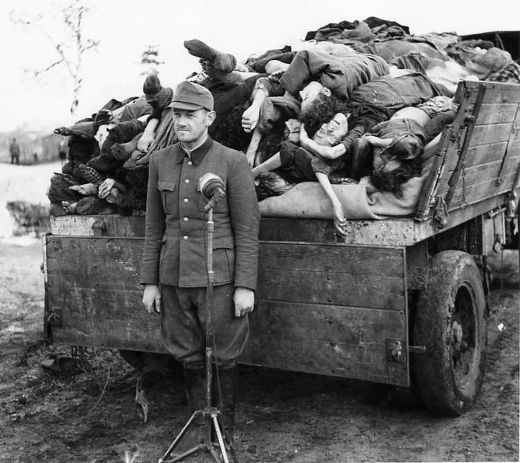
Franz Hößler served as Schutzhaftlagerführer at Mittelbau-Dora. Posing after capture by the Allies in 1945

Schutzhaftlagerführer, or head of the "preventive detention camp" - Schutzhaft, lit. protective custody, being a Nazi euphemism for preventive detention - was a paramilitary title of the SS, specific to the concentration and extermination camps Totenkopfverbande ("Death's-Head units"). A Schutzhaftlagerführer was in charge of the economic function of the camp. Usually, there was more than one SS man performing that function at each location due to their enormous size. Schutzhaftlagerführers received orders from the central offices in Berlin, such as DEST run directly by the SS. Prisoners' lives were entirely in their hands. Their orders, which usually involved routine maltreatment of condemned victims, were carried out through "assignments" so they would not have to deal with the dead resulting from them.

The Schutzhaftlagerführer and his adjutant were responsible for the operation of the camp. The Schutzhaftlagerführer had to maintain order, take care of daily routines, roll calls and so on. Under him were the Rapportführer, the Arbeitseinsatzführer and the Oberaufseherin (if there was a women's camp). They were directly responsible for order in the camp and they assigned prisoners to the outside work details. The Blockführer, each of whom was responsible for one or more barracks, were subordinate to them.

Notable people
Name	Highest SS rank attained	US/UK equivalent rank	Concentration camp
Hans Aumeier	SS-Sturmbannführer	Major	Auschwitz I
Georg Bachmayer	SS-Hauptsturmführer	Captain	Mauthausen
Hermann Baranowski	SS-Oberführer	Senior colonel	Dachau
Hermann Campe	SS-Obersturmführer		Natzweiler-Struthof, Bergen-Belsen
Karl Fritzsch	SS-Hauptsturmführer	Captain	Auschwitz, Flossenbürg
Otto Harder	SS-Untersturmführer	Second lieutenant	Ahlem
Franz Hössler	SS-Obersturmführer	First lieutenant	Auschwitz, Mittelbau-Dora, Bergen-Belsen
Karl-Otto Koch	SS-Standartenführer	Colonel	Lichtenburg
Josef Kramer	SS-Hauptsturmführer	Captain	Natzweiler-Struthof
Paul Heinrich Theodor Müller	SS-Obersturmführer	First lieutenant	Auschwitz
Alexander Piorkowski	SS-Sturmbannführer	Major	Dachau
Wilhelm Ruppert			Dachau, Majdanek
Albert Sauer			Sachsenhausen
Wilhelm Schitli	SS-Hauptsturmführer	Captain	Neuengamme
Wolfgang Seuß	SS-Hauptscharführer		Natzweiler-Struthof
Günther Tamaschke	SS-Standartenführer	Colonel	Dachau
Anton Thumann	SS-Obersturmführer	First lieutenant	Gross-Rosen, Majdanek, Neuengamme
Jakob Weiseborn	SS-Sturmbannführer	Major	Dachau, Sachsenhausen, Buchenwald
Egon Zill	SS-Sturmbannführer	Major	Lichtenburg, Dachau, Buchenwald

== See also ==
- Concentration Camps Inspectorate

== Additional sources ==
- de:Karin Orth: Die Konzentrationslager-SS. dtv, München 2004, ISBN 3-423-34085-1.
- Wolfgang Kirsten: Das Konzentrationslager als Institution totalen Terrors. Centaurus, Pfaffenweiler 1992, ISBN 3-89085-649-7.
- Hermann Langbein: Menschen in Auschwitz. Frankfurt am Main, Berlin Wien, Ullstein-Verlag, 1980, ISBN 3-54833014-2.
- Eugen Kogon: de:Der SS-Staat. Das System der deutschen Konzentrationslager, Alber, München 1946: Heyne, München 1995, ISBN 3-453-02978-X
