= Konrad Morgen =

German SS judge and lawyer (1909–1982)

- Formal portrait of Morgen
- Born: Georg Konrad Morgen; 8 June 1909; Frankfurt am Main, Grand Duchy of Hesse, German Empire
- Died: 4 February 1982 (aged 72); West Germany
- Other name: The Bloodhound Judge
- SS career
- Allegiance: Germany
- Branch: Schutzstaffel
- Service years: 1933–1945
- Rank: Sturmbannführer

Georg Konrad Morgen (8 June 1909 – 4 February 1982) was a German SS Investigating Judge and Reich Police Official who investigated members of the SS for corruption and murder, especially in the Nazi concentration and extermination camps. He rose to the rank of SS-Sturmbannführer (major). After the war, Morgen served as witness at several anti-Nazi trials and continued his legal career in Frankfurt.

Konrad Morgen was able to investigate killings in the concentration and extermination camps as murder (under the normative laws) where there was no lawful order from Hitler authorising them. According to Professor David Fraser, "It is not possible to situate the juridical activities and criminal investigations carried out by Morgen within the camps without understanding the system as one that was legally constituted as part of a bureaucratic and legal struggle for domination within the Nazi state." In postwar testimony, Morgen said that these investigations were intended to impede Nazi mass killings.

In their biography, historians Herlinde Pauer-Studer and J. David Velleman describe Morgen as a paradoxical figure who was at home in the SS despite not being a true believer in Nazi ideology. They write that Morgen cared only for criminal justice, not social or political injustices, and deplored the concentration camps mainly for their corrupting effects on SS men.

== Early life and war service ==
Born to a railwayman in Frankfurt, Morgen graduated from the University of Frankfurt and The Hague Academy of International Law, before becoming a judge in Stettin. Morgen joined the Nazi Party on 1 April 1933 ("on the advice of my parents"), and had joined the SS in March. He was dismissed for acquitting a teacher who had been brought up on charges of excessive corporal punishment, probably at the instigation of the Hitler Youth. At the outbreak of the war, he entered the Waffen-SS and was sent for basic military training. After the invasion of France in 1940, he was demobilized and employed as a judge in the SS Judiciary, which assigned him to its court in Kraków. In Kraków he investigated several highly placed SS officers for corruption, including Hermann Fegelein, a favorite of Heinrich Himmler's and the future brother-in-law of Eva Braun. He also exposed one of Fegelein's co-conspirators, Jaroslawa Mirowska, as a double agent for the Polish underground.

The first German soldier to be executed on Morgen's orders was Georg von Sauberzweig in 1941, for having resold some supplies reserved for the troops on the black market.

After requesting a transfer, Morgen was instead dismissed by Himmler, ostensibly for acquitting an SS officer of the racial crime of sexual relations with an alien race, but also perhaps for meddling in Himmler's affairs. He was punished by being sent to the Wiking Division on the Eastern Front. However, in mid-1943, Himmler recalled Morgen to investigate and prosecute corruption in the concentration camp system, displeased by SS officers looting from victims for self-gain. He instead preferred that they handed over the property to the government.

Morgen's investigations began with Karl-Otto Koch, the commandant of Buchenwald and Majdanek, Koch's wife Ilse Koch, sadistic SS NCO Martin Sommer, and Buchenwald's camp doctor Waldemar Hoven. Charges included theft, military insubordination, and murder. Koch was tried, convicted, and executed shortly before the end of the war. In post-war testimony, Morgen claimed the stories of Frau Koch's fetish with lampshades made of human skin were merely a legend: he had personally searched Koch's home near Buchenwald and found nothing of the kind. He later told the American journalist John Toland that he persisted in denying the story while being threatened with beatings and while actually being beaten twice by his Allied interrogators after the war.

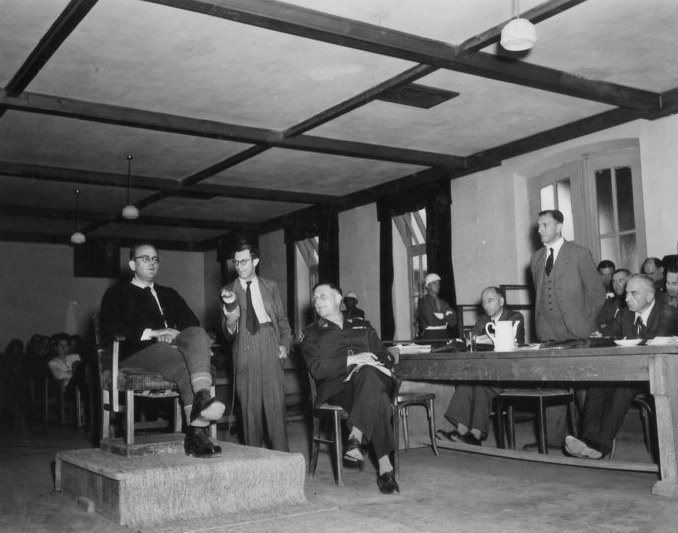
10 June 1947. "10 June. L/r: Defense witness, Dr. Morgen; German radio reporter, Werner Klein; interpreter, Rudolph Nathanson, WDC; and defense attorney, Dr. Wacker. Dr. Morgen was an investigator who came to Buchenwald to investigate Commander Koch, who was in charge at the time. As a result of Dr. Morgen's investigation, Koch was arrested and executed. Dr. Morgen is also a prisoner at Dachau."

In addition to prosecuting concentration-camp officers, Morgen sought an arrest warrant for Adolf Eichmann, on charges of having taken possession of precious stones seized from prisoners, as Eichmann himself confirmed at his trial in Jerusalem, but Morgen's request was rejected.

During the late summer and fall of 1943, Morgen looked into rumors that Christian Wirth – who was, unbeknownst to Morgen, supervisor of the extermination centers of Operation Reinhard – had permitted SS officers to participate in a drunken Jewish wedding near Lublin. Investigating, he found Wirth presiding over a collection center for vast quantities of clothing and valuables from the victims. On one visit to Lublin, Morgen became an accidental witness to the aftermath of Operation Harvest Festival: the liquidation of three large (Majdanek, Poniatowa, and Trawniki) and several smaller Jewish labor camps in the Lublin area. The operation, ostensibly a preemptive security measure, was said to have been ordered by Himmler on the grounds that the inmates had obtained weapons and made contact with communist partisans active in the surrounding forests. In fact the Jews in each camp were executed with little resistance. Over a two-day span, some 43,000 male and female prisoners were shot. Morgen arrived the day after the massacre had ended. He compiled a report from the testimony of eyewitnesses, a portion of which was read out in the pre-trial interrogation of Ernst Kaltenbrunner at Nuremberg: "the men went first, filing into one trench, and later the nude women had their own separate trenches....all passed silently and methodically through the trenches, so the executions went very quickly."

Two packages of dental gold, sent by an Auschwitz dental technician to his wife, had been confiscated by postal inspectors and passed on to Morgen for investigation. Realizing that the gold must have been collected from Holocaust victims, Morgen sent an investigative team to Auschwitz and later visited himself, receiving a thorough tour of the killing center at Birkenau. His investigation was not popular, and a building where evidence files were stored was burned down. Although he could not prosecute the mass extermination of Jews – which, as he explained after the war, was legalized by order of Hitler – he still went on to prosecute the camp commandant Rudolf Höss and the Chief of the camp Gestapo, Maximilian Grabner, for crimes including murder.

Morgen's investigations were eventually halted by Heinrich Himmler, who assigned him to a different position. Some SS officials had wanted him sent to a concentration camp.

== Post-war ==
After the war, Morgen was a witness for the defense at the trial of Nazi war criminals at the International Military Tribunal in Nuremberg, the WVHA trial, and the 1965 Auschwitz trial in Frankfurt am Main.

Morgen claimed after the war that his prosecutions were an attempt to impede the mass extermination, and two scholars (Herlinde Pauer-Studer and David Velleman, who wrote a biography about Morgen) found this explanation credible in light of the evidence. However, the reason for Morgen's opposition can be questioned, and the scholars noted that Morgen "deplored the concentration camp system not in principle but for its corrupting effects on individuals who went on to commit individual crimes." In a review of this book Professor Charles Fried said, "What kind of people are these, these ordinary mid-level bureaucrats?…..How do we know by what processes, moved by what confrontation, what realization, some may change from being guilty time-servers to being heroes of resistance – or like Morgen, something in between." He goes on to say, "I am driven to ask, what would I have done in Morgen’s shoes? What should I have done?"

In 1971 John Toland, an American historian, interviewed Morgen for his biography of Adolf Hitler. In his book Toland described Morgen as "the man who did the most to hinder the atrocities in the East", and his career as a "one man house-cleaning", and a "lonesome attempt to end the final solution."

After the Nuremberg trials, Morgen continued his legal career in Frankfurt, although not before he was himself brutally beaten, arrested and taken into custody on January 28, 1946, in Ludwigsburg. Because of his membership and high rank in the SS he was brought before a denazification tribunal in 1948. He defended himself with the claim he had become a lawyer "to serve justice" and told the court he had fought against "crimes against humanity". Despite Morgen's position, the court decided to classify him as an Entlasteter (innocent) since he had put himself at risk during his investigations. A revision of the trial against him took place in 1950 by the district court of Nord-Württemberg. This time, he was indicted as a Mitläufer (follower), but he remained a free man.

Additionally, the district court of Frankfurt am Main opened three legal investigations against Morgen. He was accused of involvement in the deportation of Hungarian Jews and of participating in a medical experiment on Russian prisoners of war in Buchenwald. In the absence of evidence, he was not prosecuted.

Morgen appeared in the television series World at War, including in the programme "Hitler's Germany: Total War 1939–1945" (Part 5 DVD 1 in the DVD boxed set). In the latter, he said he could not understand why Germany kept fighting when it was obvious that the war was lost, and blamed the leaders of the regime.

Morgen died on 4 February 1982.

== Nazis indicted by Konrad Morgen ==
- Hans Aumeier – Tried, convicted and executed by Poland in 1948.
- Johann Blank – Buchenwald Hauptscharführer, indicted along with Koch; hanged himself in custody on 15 February 1944.
- Hermann Florstedt – Commandant of Majdanek; sentenced to death; possibly executed in 1945.
- Amon Göth – Commandant of the Kraków-Płaszów concentration camp, removed from his position on charges of corruption and excess cruelty. The charges were later dropped due to Germany's looming defeat. Göth was transferred to a mental hospital. He was arrested there by U.S. soldiers and extradited to Poland, where he was executed in 1946.
- Maximilian Grabner – Head of political section in Auschwitz, accused of murder but not sentenced. Grabner was executed by Poland in 1948.
- Adam Grünewald – Commandant of Herzogenbusch concentration camp; found guilty of maltreatment of prisoners and sentenced to 3.5 years in prison, but later posted to a penal unit; killed in action in 1945.
- Hermann Hackmann – In charge of protective custody in Majdanek – condemned to death for murder but eventually posted to a penal unit; sentenced to death at the Buchenwald trial in 1947, but reprieved; released in 1955; sentenced to another 10 years in prison at the Majdanek trials in 1981; died in 1994.
- Waldemar Hoven – Buchenwald Hauptsturmführer, arrested for murdering Hauptscharführer Rudolf Köhler in September 1943; released from custody in March 1945; convicted at the Doctors' Trial and executed in 1948.
- Karl-Otto Koch – Commandant of Buchenwald and Majdanek – executed in 1945 for three unauthorized murders, including that of Walter Kraemer and embezzlement.
- Rudolf Köhler – Buchenwald Hauptscharführer, indicted along with Koch; murdered in custody by Waldemar Hoven in 1943.
- Karl Künstler – Commandant of Flossenbürg concentration camp – dismissed for drunkenness and debauchery; likely killed in action in 1945.
- Hans Loritz – Commandant of Oranienburg – proceedings initiated on suspicion of arbitrary killing; committed suicide in custody in 1946.
- Alexander Piorkowski – Commandant of the Dachau concentration camp – accused of murder but not sentenced; sentenced to death at the Dachau trials and executed in 1948.
- Georg von Sauberzweig – accused of having resold some supplies reserved for the troops on the black market, and executed in 1941.
- Martin Sommer – Buchenwald Hauptscharführer and depraved sadist and murderer, indicted along with Koch; sentenced to a penal unit and transferred to the Russian Front and wounded; later served time in prison, but died in a nursing home in 1988.
