= Lichtenburg concentration camp =

Nazi concentration camp in Germany

Lichtenburg
- Concentration camp
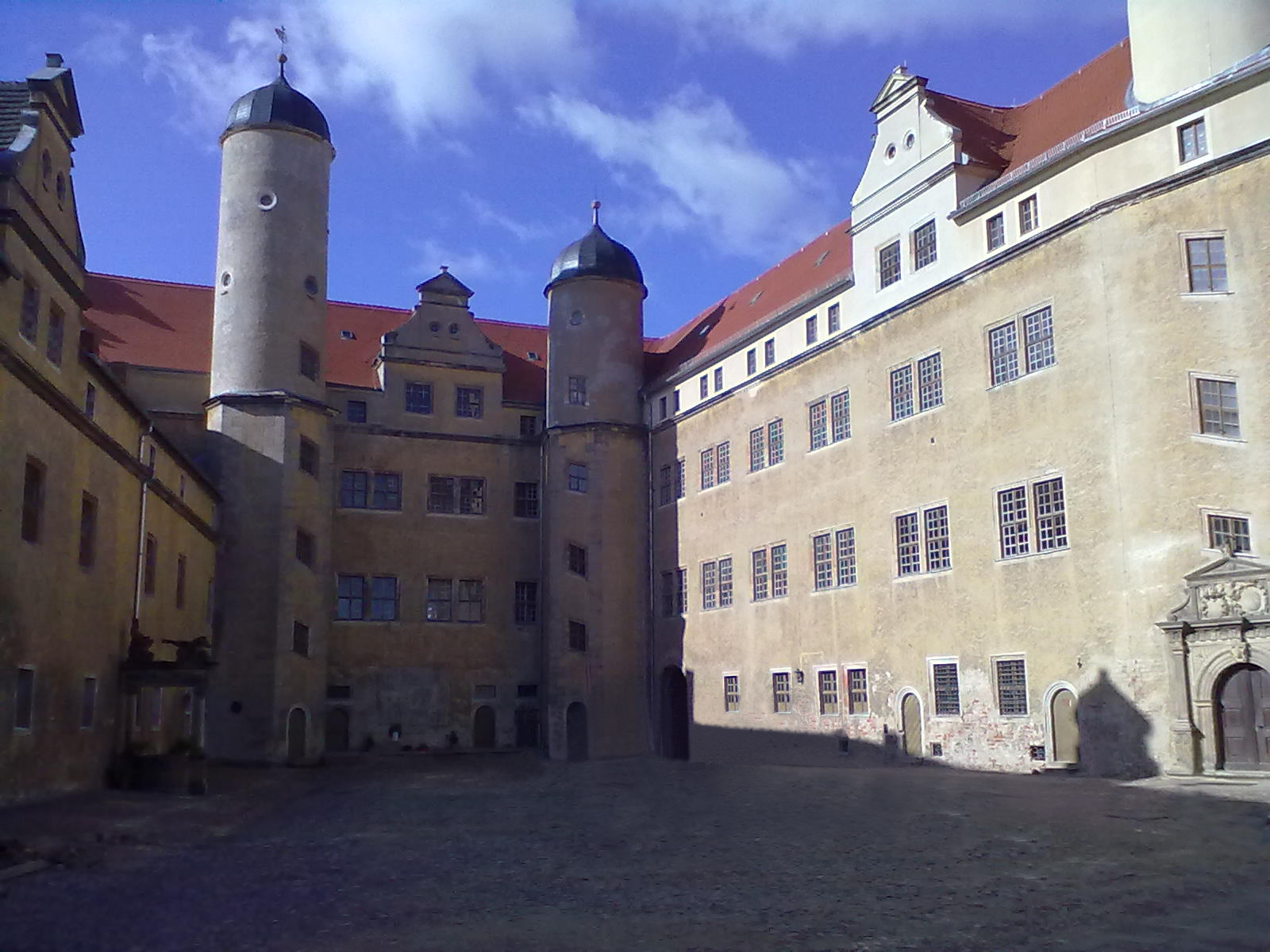
- Lichtenburg Castle

- Location within Germany
- Coordinates: 51°39′45″N 12°55′55″E
- Known for: One of the first Nazi concentration camps
- Location: Prettin, Saxony
- Operated by: Nazi Germany
- Commandant: Theodor Eicke (May 1934 – July 1934); Bernhard Schmidt (de) (July 1934 – March 1935); Otto Reich (de) (March 1935 – March 1936); Hermann Baranowski (April 1936 – October 1936); Hans Helwig (November 1936 – July 1937); Alexander Piorkowski (July 1937 – December 1937)
- Operational: 13 June 1933 – May 1939
- Inmates: Before 1937, male political prisoners; after 1937, female political prisoners
- Number of inmates: More than 2,000
- Notable inmates: Lina Haag

Lichtenburg was a Nazi concentration camp, housed in a Renaissance castle in Prettin, near Wittenberg in the Province of Saxony. Along with Sachsenburg, it was among the first to be built by the Nazis, and was operated by the SS from 1933 to 1939. It held as many as 2000 male prisoners from 1933 to 1937 and from 1937 to 1939 held female prisoners. It was closed in May 1939, when the Ravensbrück concentration camp for women was opened, which replaced Lichtenburg as the main camp for female prisoners.

== Operation ==
Details about the operation of Lichtenburg, held by the International Tracing Service, only became available to researchers in late 2006. An account of the way the camp was run may be read in Lina Haag's book A Handful of Dust or How Long the Night. Haag was perhaps the best known survivor of Lichtenburg, having obtained release before it was shut down.

Lichtenburg was among the first concentration camps in Nazi Germany operating under the SS from 13 June 1933; it became a kind of model for numerous subsequent establishments. Soon overcrowded, the detention conditions became increasingly aggravated. Most of the inmates were political prisoners, and so-called habitual offenders (Gewohnheitsverbrecher).

In 1936 Heinrich Himmler appointed Hermann Baranowski commandant of the camp. From 1937 on it became a camp only for women. In 1939 the SS transferred 900 Lichtenburg prisoners to Ravensbrück, which were its first female prisoners.

The castle today houses a regional museum and exhibit about Lichtenburg's use during the Nazi period.

== Personnel ==
=== Camp commandant ===
- May 1934 – July 1934: SS-Brigadeführer Theodor Eicke
- July 1934 – March 1935: SS-Obersturmbannführer Bernhard Schmidt (de)
- March 1935 – March 1936: SS-Standartenführer Otto Reich (de)
- April 1936 – October 1936: SS-Standartenführer Hermann Baranowski
- November 1936 – July 1937: SS-Standartenführer Hans Helwig
- July 1937 – December 1937: Commisar Alexander Piorkowski

=== Protective custody chief ===
- July 1934 – February 1935: Edgar Entsberger
- February 1935 – April 1935 Karl Otto Koch
- April 1935 – October 1936 Heinrich Remmert (de)
- November 1936 – August 1937 Egon Zill

=== Director of women's camp ===
- December 1937 – May 1939 Günther Tamaschke

=== Deputy director of camp ===
- December 1937 – August 1938 Alexander Piorkowski
- September 1938 – May 1939 Max Koegel

=== Other personnel ===
- Johanna Langefeld (1900–1974), overseer
- Arthur Liebehenschel (1901–1948), adjutant
- Maria Mandl (1912–1948), overseer
- Arthur Rödl (1898–1945), guard
- Emma Zimmer (1888–1948), overseer
- Egon Zill (1906–1974), guard

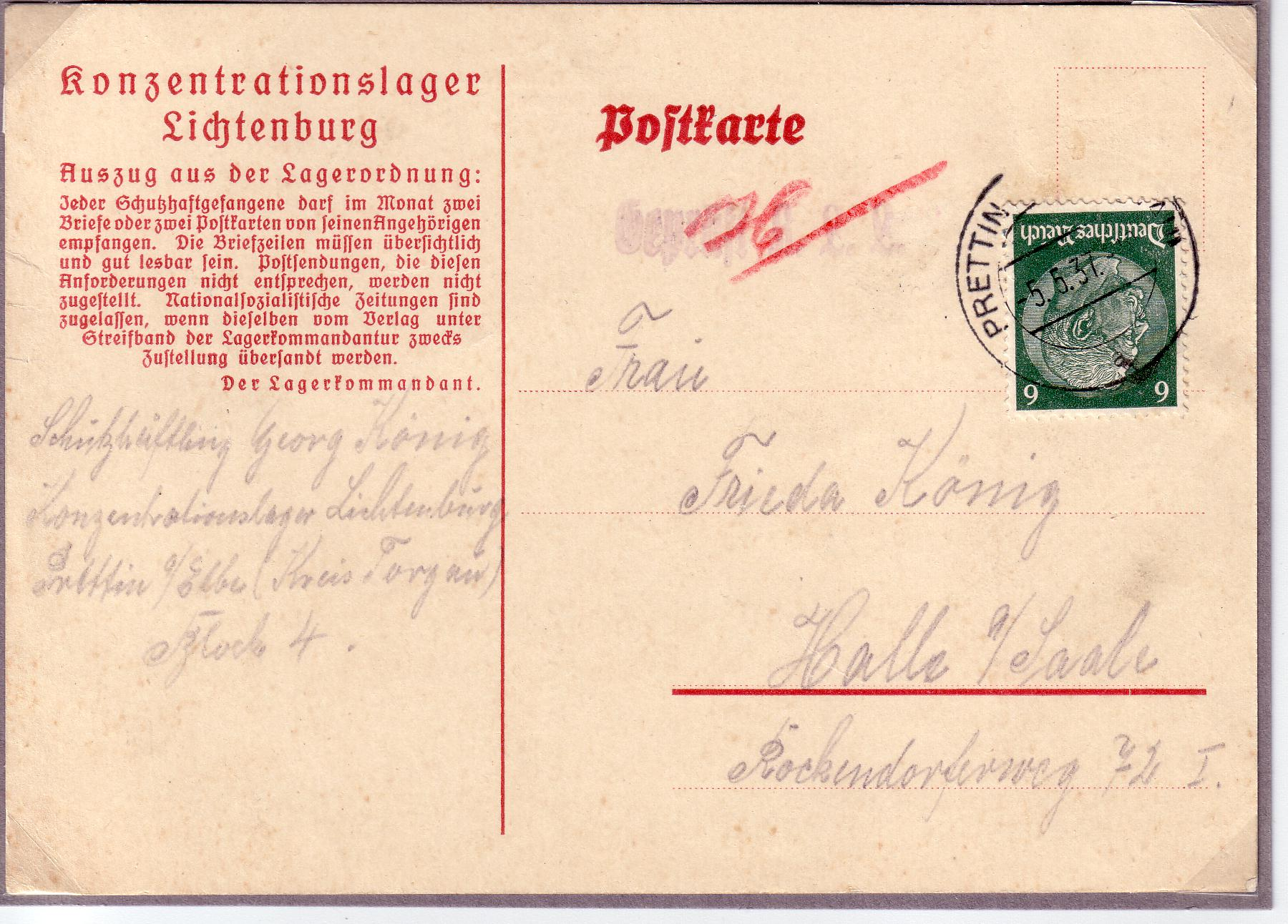
Prisoner postcard to family, 5 August 1937

== Notable inmates ==
- Olga Benário Prestes (1908-1942), German-Brazilian resistance fighter
- Walter Czollek (1909-1972), Communist and publisher
- Arthur Dietzsch (1901-1974), accused of being a communist
- Friedrich Ebert junior (1894–1979), Politician, son of Friedrich Ebert
- Werner von Fichte (1896–1955), SA general, chief of police
- Philipp Fries (1882–1950), Socialist politician
- Paul Frölich (1884–1953), journalist and biographer of Rosa Luxemburg
- Ernst Grube (1890–1945), Socialist politician (not to be confused with Ernst Grube (b. 1932), son of Jewish and Communist parents)
- Lina Haag (1907–2012), Anti-Nazi activist and author
- Lotti Huber (1912–1998), actress
- Erich Knauf (1895–1944), journalist and songwriter, executed in Brandenburg-Görden Prison for making jokes
- Wolfgang Langhoff (1901–1966), actor
- Wilhelm Leuschner (1890–1944), unionist, executed near Berlin
- Hans Litten (1903–1938), lawyer
- Hans Lorbeer (1901–1973), author, Communist
- Karl Mache (1880–1944), Socialist politician, died in Gross-Rosen concentration camp
- Charles Regnier (1914–2001), actor
- Ernst Reuter (1889–1953), Social Democrat
- Kurt von Ruffin (1901–1996), actor, interred for homosexuality
- Gotthard Sachsenberg (1891–1961), WWI ace and later WP politician
- Werner Scholem (1895–1940), Communist politician, died in Buchenwald concentration camp
- Fritz Thurm (1883–1937), Social Democrat, resistance fighter
- Ludwig Trautmann (1885–1957), Actor and film producer (convicted for homosexuality)
- Lisa Ullrich (1900–1986), Communist politician
- Armin T. Wegner (1886–1978), human rights activist, documentor of Armenian genocide

== See also ==
- Persecution of Jehovah's Witnesses in Nazi Germany
