= Hermann Florstedt =

German Nazi officer (1895–1945)

Arthur Hermann Florstedt
- Born: 18 February 1895; Bitsch, Bezirk Lothringen, German Empire
- Died: On or after 5 April 1945
- Cause of death: Execution by firing squad
- Status: Executed
- Conviction: Embezzlement
- Penalty: Death
- Military career
- Allegiance: German Empire (1912–1918) Weimar Germany (1918–1919) Nazi Germany (1933–1945)
- Branch: Imperial German Army (1912–1919); Schutzstaffel (1931–1945)
- Service years: 1912–1919; 1931–1945
- Rank: SS-Standartenführer
- Commands: Majdanek concentration camp
- Awards: Iron Cross 2nd Class 1914; Honor Cross of World War 1914/1918; SA-Sports Badge in Bronze; NSDAP Party Badge

Arthur Hermann Florstedt (18 February 1895 – 5 April 1945) was a German SS official who served as the third commandant of Majdanek concentration camp from November 1942 to October 1943.

Florstedt was a veteran of World War I and involved in right-wing paramilitaries before joining the Nazi Party in 1931. Florstedt rose through the ranks of the SS to hold high-ranking positions at various Nazi concentration camps from 1939, including Buchenwald where he developed a reputation for brutality against prisoners. Florstedt was arrested in 1943 during a corruption investigation into Karl-Otto Koch for stealing the valuables of Holocaust victims at Majdanek. Florstedt was convicted and sentenced to death, but his execution on 5 April 1945 shortly before the end of World War II is unconfirmed and his fate is unknown.

== Early life ==
Arthur Hermann Florstedt was born on 18 February 1895 in Bitsch, Bezirk Lothringen (present-day Bitche, France) the son of an Imperial German Army sergeant. His family were from Eisleben in the Prussian Province of Saxony, but his father was stationed at Bitsch's citadel and they returned to Eisleben in 1897. Florstedt joined the Prussian Army in Potsdam in 1912 and, following the outbreak of World War I in 1914, served on both the Western and Eastern fronts. He was taken as a prisoner of war by the Russians in 1917, during which he impregnated a Russian woman, and was allowed to return to Germany after the child was born in May 1918. His child, a son named Walter, was raised by his parents.

Florstedt was discharged from the army in January 1919 and moved to Weimar, where he married Charlotte Wille in May 1922, and was active in the right-wing paramilitary Stahlhelm military association from 1920 to 1924. Florstedt and his wife moved to Eisleben in 1929 where he declared himself bankrupt to his relatives. In November 1929, the Eisleben district court issued him a fine of 100 RM for assault. By 1931, he was working as a sales manager in a bicycle shop.

== Political career ==
Florstedt joined the Nazi Party on 1 March 1931 (membership number 488,573) and the Sturmabteilung (SA) in April, but switched to the Schutzstaffel (SS) with membership number 8,660 a month later. He was active in the political violence against the Communist Party of Germany (KPD) in Eisleben. After the Nazis came to power in early 1933, Florstedt was appointed mayor of Eisleben in April and took part in the political repression in the town, allegedly participating in the torture of KPD members. In April 1934, Florstedt was promoted to Hauptsturmführer and placed in command of the 73rd SS-Standarte in Ansbach. In August 1935, he took over the 14th SS-Kaiserstandarte in Karlsruhe with the rank of SS-Obersturmbannführer. In personnel report from September 1935 signed by Hans-Adolf Prützmann, he received a glowing review from his commanders, though his behaviour would lead to a series of reprimands. On 2 December 1935, Florstedt received a fine of 300 RM for disturbing the peace and property damage after he had caused a drunken riot at a Bruchsal police station the day before. In March 1936, Florstedt's command was transferred to Sturmbann I/36 in Kassel as punishment for insulting a Reichsbahn official in January. He was placed in command of the 35th SS Standarte in Kassel in January 1937 and promoted to the rank of Standartenführer in April 1938.

=== Concentration camps ===
Florstedt became a member of the Waffen-SS with the rank of Obersturmführer in September 1939. That month, he was appointed a camp guard leader at Buchenwald concentration camp, moving to the commandant's office located in Weimar. His behavior towards the camp guards has been described as "extraordinarily haughty and arrogant" which led to several complaints. Richard Glücks, chief of the Concentration Camps Inspectorate, suggested he be appointed as a guard leader at a "protective custody" camp - a position where he would have no direct contact with the guards. He served at Sachsenhausen concentration camp from July 1940 for three months before returning to Buchenwald as a camp leader and then as deputy commandant. Florstedt developed a reputation for being particularly cruel and unpredictable among the prisoners. He made Jewish prisoners sing a so-called "Jewish song" which contained anti-Semitic and offensive lyrics. In October 1941, Florstedt was responsible for ordering a one-day food deprivation for the entire concentration camp. When a protest had taken place in the camp in favor of newly arrived and completely undernourished Soviet prisoners of war, he had three well-known communist prisoner functionaries replaced and punished with beatings. Florstedt was transferred to the Mauthausen concentration camp in June 1942.

Florstedt was appointed commandant of Majdanek concentration camp in November 1942 to replace SS-Sturmbannführer Max Koegel. In October 1943, Florstedt was temporarily suspended and replaced by the interim commander Martin Gottfried Weiss as part of a corruption investigation into Karl-Otto Koch, who had been commandant of several camps where Florstedt served. Koch was accused of taking valuables from dead prisoners, which the Nazis considered to be state property. Florstedt was investigated by SS Judge Georg Konrad Morgen and charged with embezzlement and arbitrary killing of prisoner witnesses. He was one of two Majdanek commandants put on trial by the SS in the course of the camp operation. Florstedt was charged with corruption (wholesale stealing from the state); he had access to valuables stolen from those murdered at the Belzec, Sobibor and Treblinka camps. These valuables were stored and processed at Majdanek where both Florstedt and Koch had served as commandant. Florstedt was found guilty of murder and corruption by an SS court and sentenced to death.

== Disappearance ==
Florstedt was allegedly executed by the SS on 5 April 1945, the same day as Koch's execution which has been confirmed, though his fate remains disputed. According to Ernst Klee, Florstedt was shot on Heinrich Himmler's orders shortly before the end of the war. Martin Sommer, who was also the subject of internal SS investigations, told West German investigators in 1963 that Florstedt had been shot in Buchenwald together with Koch, which was confirmed by Morgen. However, neither Sommer nor Morgen were present at the execution, and office records at Buchenwald were destroyed during the war. Others have claimed that Florstedt had not been executed, including his sister-in-law who claimed that he stayed with her in Halle (Saale) before going into hiding.

On 24 April 1962 the Thüringer Tageblatt, a newspaper of the Christian Democratic Union in East Germany, reported that Florstedt worked for the Kriminalpolizei in Mainz. The newspaper's publisher later referred to West German investigative authorities on the information of an unnamed Buchenwald prisoner who now lives in West Germany. Mainz police investigated the claim but were unsuccessful. The Central Office of the State Justice Administrations for the Investigation of National Socialist Crimes considered Florstedt's death to be unproven according to a memo dated 6 October 1975.

== Notes ==
Military offices
Preceded by SS-Sturmbannführer Max Koegel	Commandant of Majdanek concentration camp November 1942 – October 1943	Succeeded by SS-Obersturmbannführer Martin Gottfried Weiss
