= Wilhelm Schitli =

German SS officer (1912–2000)

Commandant, Arbeitsdorf concentration camp
- In office July 1942 – October 1942
- Preceded by: Martin Gottfried Weiss
- Succeeded by: Camp closed

Personal details
- Born: June 26, 1912 Osnabrück
- Died: March 1945 or after
- Party: NSDAP

Wilhelm Schitli (26 June 1912 in Osnabrück – missing in March 1945) was a German SS-Hauptsturmführer and Schutzhaftlagerführer in the Neuengamme concentration camp.

== Life ==
In 1934, Schitli, a member of the SS, was a member of the guard of the concentration camp Esterwegen concentration camp and 1936 Rapportführer in the Sachsenhausen concentration camp. In early 1940 he was briefly second Schutzhaftlagerführer in the Buchenwald concentration camp and was in the course of construction of the Neuengamme concentration camp in the spring of 1940, first Schutzhaftlagerführer in the Neuengamme concentration camp. From mid-July 1942 he also served as Commandant of the independent concentration camp work village, a pilot project for the arms production at Wolfsburg, and replaced on this post Martin Gottfried Weiss. After the founding of this project, he was employed from October 1942 as Commandant of the "Jewish camp" at the SS training area Heidelager in Dębica (Poland) and remained on this post until September 1943. Then came his transfer to the Higher SS and Police Leader Ostland in Riga.

Schitli has been considered missing since 31 March 1945.

== See also ==
- List of people who disappeared
