= Alexander Piorkowski =

German Nazi concentration camp commandant

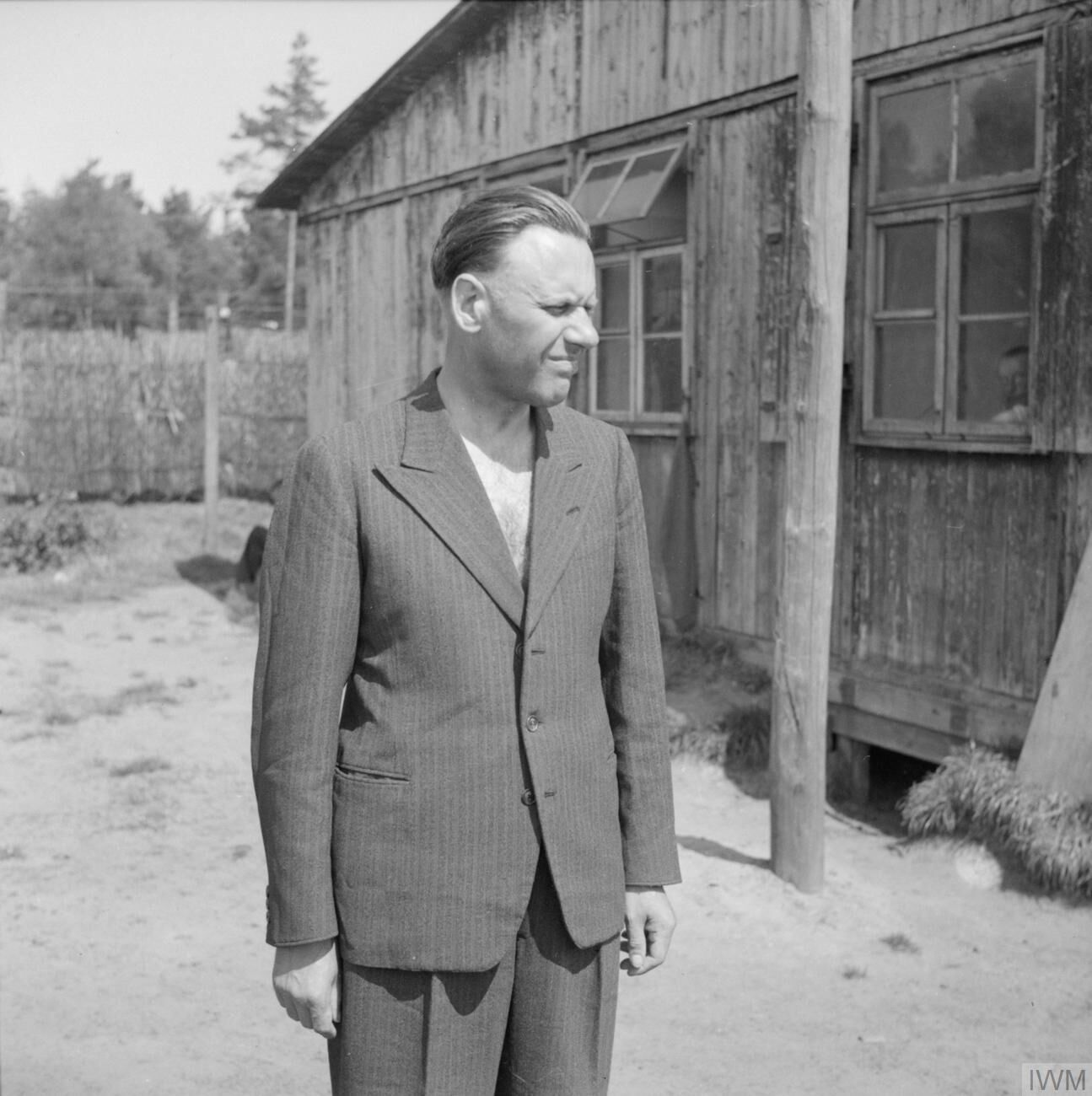
- Piorkowski under arrest by the British military at Westertimke near Bremen

Commandant of Dachau concentration camp
- In office February 1940 – Mid-September 1942

Personal details
- Born: 11 October 1904 Bremen, German Empire
- Died: 22 October 1948 (aged 44) Landsberg Prison, Landsberg am Lech, Allied-occupied Germany
- Conviction(s): War crimes
- Trial: Dachau trials
- Criminal penalty: Death
- Criminal status: Executed by hanging

Alexander Bernhard Hans Piorkowski (11 October 1904 – 22 October 1948) was a German SS functionary during the Nazi era and commandant of Dachau concentration camp. Following the war, he was convicted and executed.

== Life ==
Born in Bremen, Piorkowski was a trained mechanic who worked as a traveling merchant in the 1920s.

He joined the SA on 1 June 1929 and moved from there to the SS on 1 June 1933 (member no. 8,737). On 1 November 1929, Piorkowski became a member of the Nazi Party (member no. 161,437). He first led the SS-Standarte in Bremen on 20 July 1935, and in the following year, the SS-Standarte Allenstein. For health reasons, he retired from the service on 19 September 1936.

From July 1937 to December 1937, Piorkowski was provisionally commandant of Lichtenburg concentration camp, and after its conversion into a women's concentration camp, deputy to Lagerdirektor Günther Tamaschke until August 1938. From there he was transferred to the Dachau concentration camp in early August 1938, where he served as Schutzhaftlagerführer. From February 1940 to mid-September 1942, he was the commandant of Dachau concentration camp. Due to corruption charges, he was discharged from service on 31 August 1943.

== Post-war life and death ==
After the Second World War, Piorkowski, along with his adjutant Heinrich Detmers, had to answer to a U.S. military tribunal at the Dachau trials from 6 to 17 January 1947. The charges were war crimes for his complicity in the deportation, abduction and ill-treatment of prisoners in the former concentration camp at Dachau, his supervision of inhumane experiments conducted by Sigmund Rascher and Claus Schilling, and the mass shootings of Soviet POWs. Piorkowski was found guilty and sentenced to death.

Making futile petitions for a pardon, Piorkowski was hanged in the Landsberg Prison for war crimes. His last words were "Long live Germany, long live my family. Be well, Herr Pfarrer, I am ready. My son, take revenge for me." At the request of his family, prison officials transferred Piorkowski's remains to Munich.

== General sources ==
- Martin Gruner. Verurteilt in Dachau. Der Prozess gegen den KZ-Kommandanten Alex Piorkowski vor einem US-Militärgericht. Wißner-Verlag, Augsburg 2008, ISBN 978-3-89639-650-1
- Stefan Hördler, Sigrid Jacobeit (Hrsg.). Dokumentations- und Gedenkort KZ Lichtenburg – Konzeption einer neuen Dauerausstellung für Werkstattgebäude und Bunker. Lit-Verlag, Berlin 2009, ISBN 978-3-643-10038-2
- Ernst Klee. Das Personenlexikon zum Dritten Reich: Wer war was vor und nach 1945. Fischer-Taschenbuch-Verlag, Frankfurt am Main 2007, ISBN 978-3-596-16048-8
- Johannes Tuchel. Konzentrationslager: Organisationsgeschichte und Funktion der Inspektion der Konzentrationslager 1934–1938. (= Schriften des Bundesarchivs, Band 39). H. Boldt, 1991, ISBN 3-7646-1902-3

Military offices
Preceded by SS-Standartenführer Hans Helwig	Commandant of Lichtenburg concentration camp July–December 1937	Succeeded by none
Preceded by none	Deputy director of Lichtenburg concentration camp December 1937 – August 1938	Succeeded by SS-Obersturmbannführer Max Koegel
Preceded by SS-Oberführer Hans Loritz	Commandant of Dachau concentration camp February 1940 – September 1942	Succeeded by SS-Obersturmbannführer Martin Gottfried Weiss
