= Martin Gottfried Weiss =

German SS officer

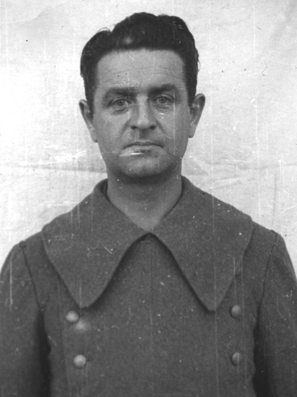
- Weiss in U.S. custody, 1945
- Born: 3 June 1905; Weiden in der Oberpfalz, Kingdom of Bavaria, German Empire
- Died: 29 May 1946 (aged 40); Landsberg Prison, Allied-occupied Germany
- Political party: Nazi Party
- Status: Executed by hanging
- Conviction: War crimes
- Trial: Dachau camp trial
- Penalty: Death
- Military career
- Allegiance: Nazi Germany
- Branch: Schutzstaffel
- Service years: 1932–1945
- Rank: SS-Obersturmbannführer

Martin Gottfried Weiss, alternatively spelled Weiß (3 June 1905 – 29 May 1946), but best known as The Demon of Dachau was the commandant of the Dachau concentration camp in 1945 at the time of his arrest. He also served from April 1940 until September 1942 as the commandant of Neuengamme concentration camp, and later, from November 1943 until May 1944, as the fourth commandant of Majdanek concentration camp. He was executed for war crimes.

== Life ==
Weiss was born in Weiden in der Oberpfalz. His father worked for the Royal Bavarian State Railways. He had two sisters and was raised as a Catholic. After school he continued his education at a mechanical engineering school in Landshut. He finished school in 1924 and worked as intern in an ironworks. Later he worked for about three and a half years for the Upper Palatine electric company. In the summer of 1926 he joined the Nazi Party and founded a chapter of the SA and of the HJ with two friends in Weiden. Later he studied electrical engineering in Bad Frankenhausen, finishing in 1930. His grades were good, so he worked as an assistant at the school until April 1932, when he was released. He went back to the Weiden area and joined the SS.

== SS career ==
From April 1933 he served with the guards of Dachau concentration camp; from November 1933 till February 1938 he was the engineer of the camp. In March he became adjutant to camp commander Hans Loritz and Alexander Piorkowski. He married in 1934, and he had at least two children.

In April 1940 he received an order for the construction of Neuengamme concentration camp. In November he became the camp commandant. The Neuengamme camp was tasked to deliver building materials for buildings in Hamburg. From April 1942 till July 1942 Weiss was also commandant of Arbeitsdorf.

=== Commandant in Dachau ===
On 1 September 1942 Weiss became commandant of Dachau concentration camp. Soon after this, Oswald Pohl criticised him severely, about the poor condition of the prisoners. Weiss thereafter made conditions in the camp a bit more humane. Weiss had taken some of his kapos from Neuengamme to Dachau. A last special action of Action 14f13 was carried out on his orders bringing death to 342 people in the Hartheim Euthanasia Centre. Weiss worked in Dachau until 31 October 1943.

During his time as commandant in Dachau, 35 people were hanged and 18 people were shot. Before his post-war trial, Weiss insisted that these people were not concentration-camp prisoners, but prisoners of the Gestapo. He said they were sentenced to death by order of Heinrich Himmler and the Reich Security Main Office. This contradicted the statement of Johann Kicks, and was also a violation of the rules of the concentration camps Lagerordnung.

=== Commander at Majdanek ===
Weiss was appointed commandant of Majdanek after his predecessor Hermann Florstedt was charged with wholesale theft from the Third Reich in order to enrich himself. He took up his position as commander of Majdanek concentration camp on 4 November 1943. On 3 November 1943, one of the worst massacres happened there; more than 17,000 Jewish people were murdered during Aktion Erntefest over the course of one day. Historians believe that Weiss was present at the time in Lublin-Majdanek to prepare himself for his new position. It is certain that on the first day of his new position as commandant, he was responsible for having to clean up the consequences of the massacre.

On 18 May 1944, SS-Obersturmbannführer Weiß was promoted. On 1 November 1944 he was sent to Mühldorf subcamp. There Organisation Todt built two underground plants for the production of fighter planes with the forced assistance of prisoners from Dachau. Because the Luftwaffe was suffering severe losses in the air war against the RAF, the forced labour contingent was driven hard. Jewish prisoners who worked there were afraid of being gassed, if they did not work hard enough. Some died of the hard work, some from typhus. Those who could not work any longer were sent to Auschwitz. The position of Weiß in Mühldorf is not absolutely clear. In any event, of all the command staff at Mühldorf, he had the highest rank.

At the end of April 1945, Weiss was in Dachau, perhaps in order to relieve the commandant, Eduard Weiter. On 28 April he discussed with SS-Standartenführer Kurt Becher how to hand over the camp to the US Army (uncertain, Becher later remembered only that the name of the man he talked to started with "W" ). On 28 April or 29 April Weiss fled from Dachau.

== Conviction and execution ==
Weiss was apprehended in Munich on 29 April 1945 by Corporal Henry Senger of the US Army 292nd Field Artillery Observation Battalion, and was tried during the Dachau Trials beginning on 13 November 1945. After being found guilty of "violating the laws and usages of war," Weiss was executed by hanging at Landsberg prison on 29 May 1946. Just before the black hood was placed over his head, Weiss shouted "I am dying for Germany!"

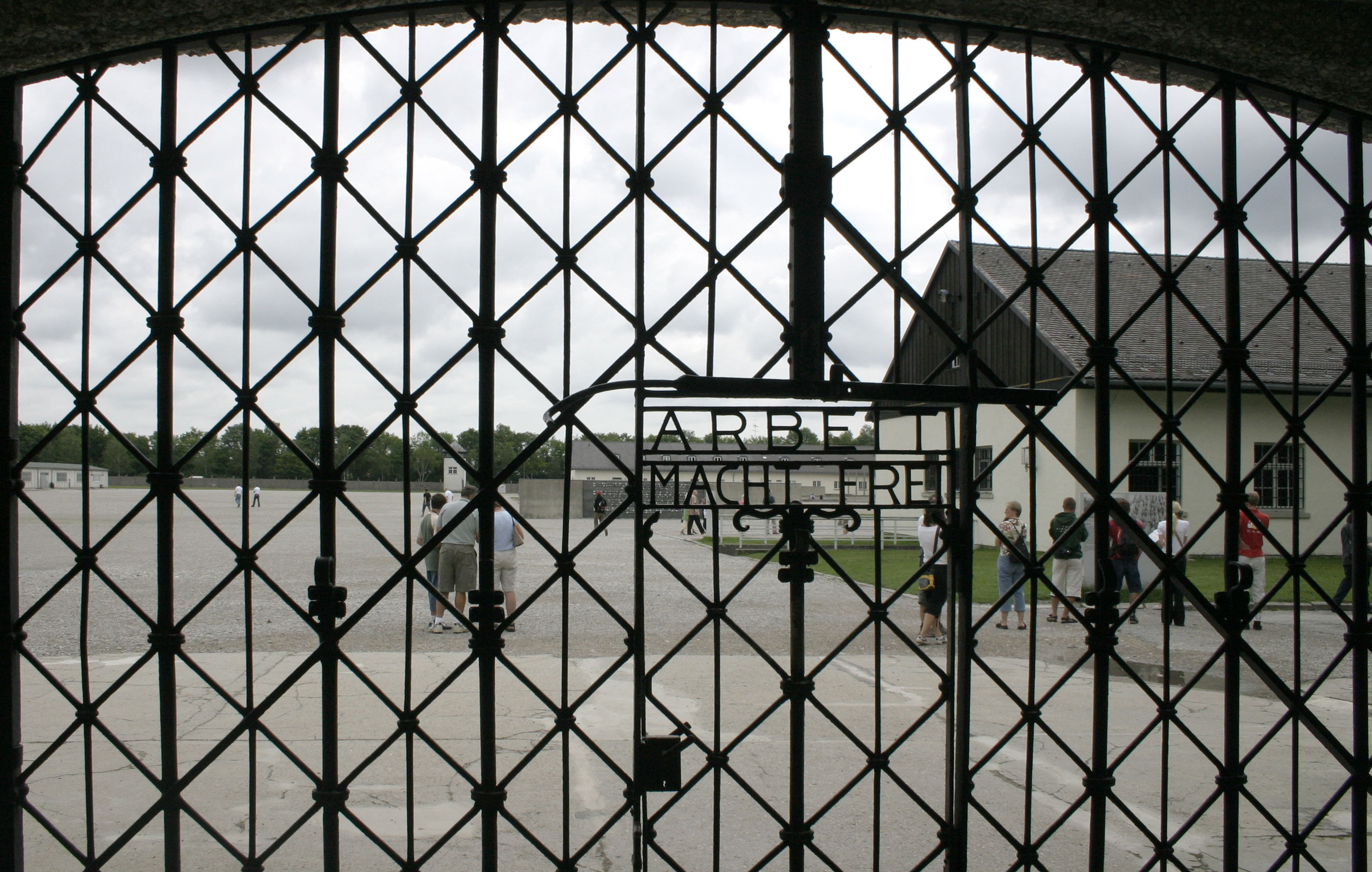
The main gate at Dachau concentration camp, marked with the slogan Arbeit macht frei

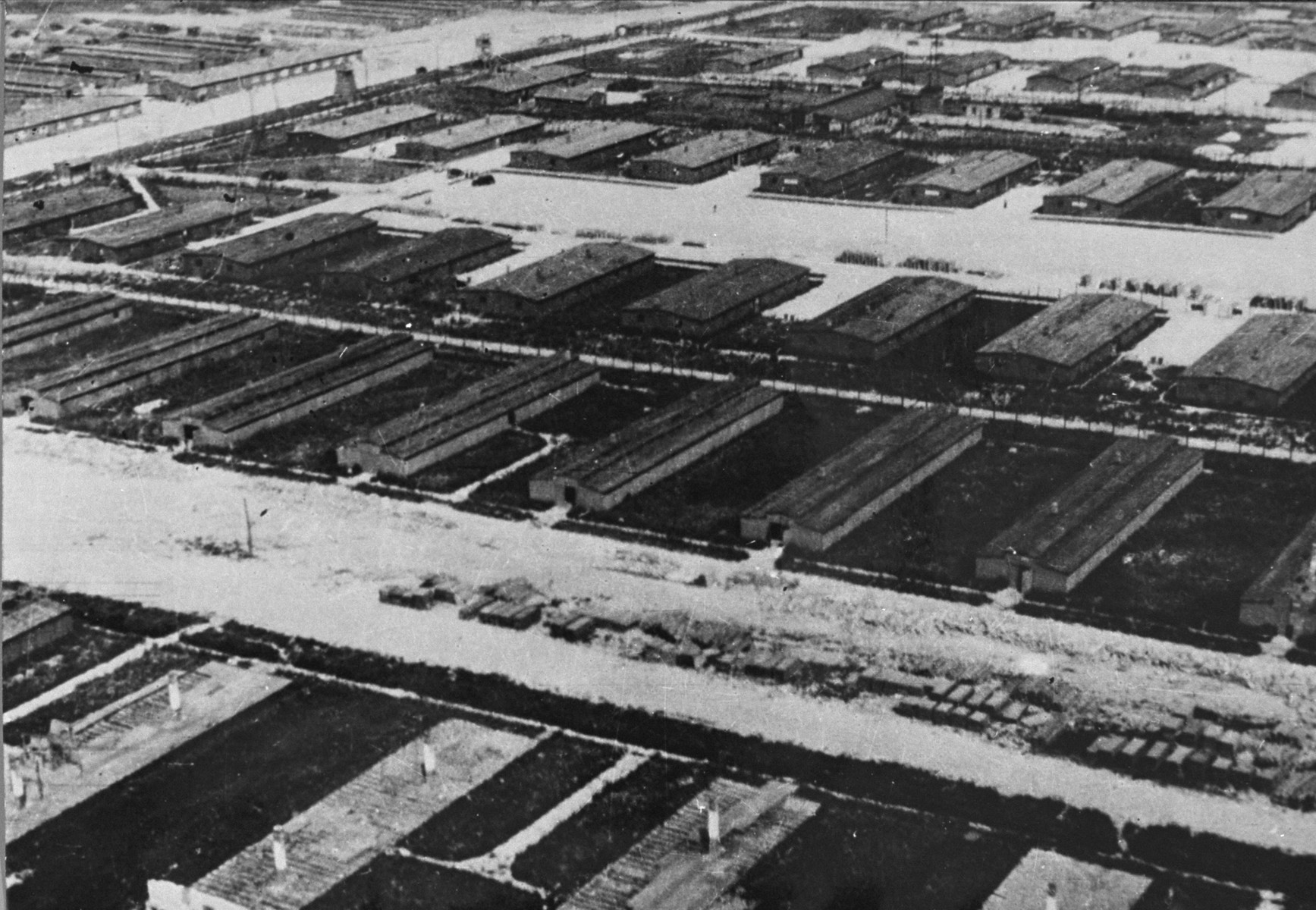
Reconnaissance photograph of the Majdanek concentration camp (1944)

Military offices
Preceded by SS-Sturmbannführer Walter Eisfeld	Commandant of Neuengamme concentration camp April 1940 – September 1942	Succeeded by SS-Obersturmbannführer Max Pauly
Preceded by SS-Obersturmführer Hermann Florstedt	Commandant of Majdanek concentration camp 1 November 1943 – 5 May 1944	Succeeded by SS-Obersturmbannführer Arthur Liebehenschel
Preceded by SS-Hauptsturmführer Eduard Weiter	Commandant of Dachau concentration camp 26 April 1945 – 28 April 1945	Succeeded by SS-Untersturmführer Johannes Otto
