= Jarosława Mirowska =

WW2 Polish double agent for the Polish resistance

Jarosława Mirowska was a Polish spy for the Waffen-SS and also a double agent for the Polish resistance in World War II.

== Biography ==
Mirowska was an employee of the Apfelbaum fur company in Warsaw before World War II. As mistress of the owner, who was Jewish, she was left in charge of the firm when he fled after the invasion of Poland by Germany in 1939. She then became involved in an affair with Albert Fassbender, heir to a chocolate-maker's fortune and protege of Hermann Fegelein, commander of the SS Cavalry Brigade.

Fegelein was an intimate of Reichsführer Heinrich Himmler and would later marry Eva Braun's sister Greta. Fassbender, Mirowska, and Fegelein bled the company of its assets and sold off the carcass for a fraction of its original value. Their conspiracy was uncovered by SS-Judge Konrad Morgen, who was employed in the SS Judiciary court in Cracow to investigate crimes of corruption by SS officers.

Fegelein had introduced Mirowska to Himmler, who personally intervened in Morgen's investigation. Of Mirowska, Himmler wrote: "This lady has some German ancestry, and having once seen her in person, I agreed and arranged for her to be recognized as volksdeutsch." After the war, Morgen declared that she was treated as the "first lady of the SS". Morgen finally determined that she was in fact working as a spy for the Polish underground.

The denouement of the story was narrated by Morgen to his American interrogators after the war: “A call came from the Reichsführer. The message was: Yes, Mirowskaja is a spy.” But when the question was raised where she should be tried, “he said, ‘No, no — that isn’t going to happen,’ and he snatched her from the jaws of the Gestapo.”
