= Heinrich Deubel =

German soldier and civil servant (1890–1962)

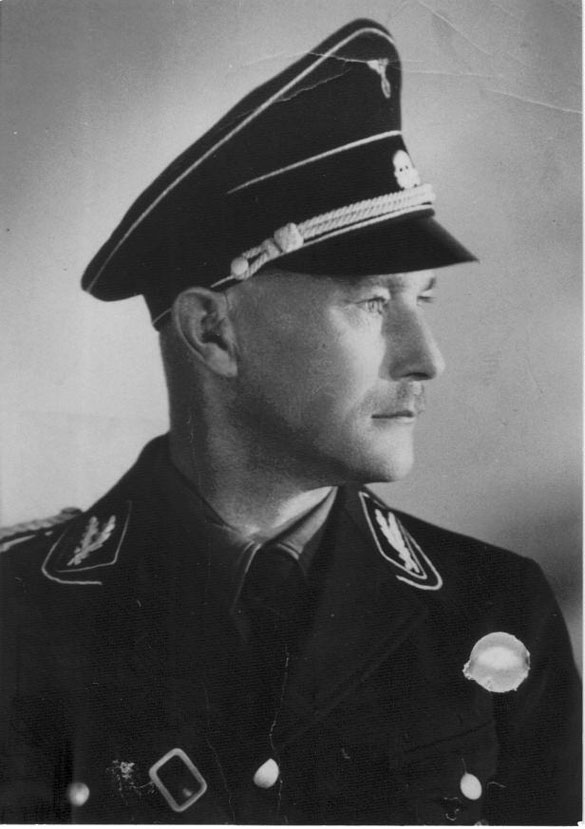
- Born: 19 February 1890; Ortenburg, Kingdom of Bavaria, German Empire
- Died: 2 October 1962 (aged 72); Dingolfing, Bavaria, West Germany (now Germany)
- Military career
- Allegiance: German Empire; Nazi Germany
- Branch: Imperial German Army; German Army
- Service years: 1914–1918; 1939–1945
- Rank: Kommandant
- Conflicts: World War I World War II

Heinrich Deubel (19 February 1890 – 2 October 1962) was a German soldier, civil servant, World War I veteran and an SS-Oberführer in the Schutzstaffel who served as the commandant of Dachau concentration camp from 1934 to 1936.

== World War I and Nazi Party membership ==
Deubel was born in Ortenburg, Kingdom of Bavaria. The son of a postman, he joined the German Imperial Army and spent 12 years in the service, although he was to spend most of the First World War in a British prisoner of war camp. Right-wing by inclination, Deubel had been involved with the Freikorps and other rightist and antisemitic groups from an early age. He was a member of the Deutschvölkischer Schutz- und Trutzbund, the largest and most active antisemitic organization in post-war Germany. He also took part in the Kapp Putsch, an attempt to overthrow the fledgling Weimar Republic. He became involved with the Nazis in the early 1920s at the same time as Egon Zill and was amongst the first 200 members of the SS. Deubel was a civil servant with the customs office and actually took a leave of absence to join the SS rather than forgo his civil service pension.

== Dachau and World War II ==
Deubel was an inspector at Dachau concentration camp in 1934 when commandant Theodor Eicke was promoted to a role overseeing all concentration camps. Deubel, by then an SS-Oberführer, was nominated by Eicke as his successor. Deubel commanded the camp from 1 May 1934 until 20 April 1936 with detainees describing his regime as fairly liberal, especially when compared to that of his successor in the role, Hans Loritz.

During his time as commandant, Deubel did fall foul of Heinrich Himmler due to a public incident of violence at a time when the SS was developing a reputation for cruelty in Germany and beyond. On Christmas Eve 1934, Deubel was present at Passau train station when an SS private got into a scuffle with a number of people after delaying the line at a ticket window. When a policeman stepped in to arrest the private, Deubel intervened, threatening to drag a policeman to the camp to be "whipped as he deserved". Deubel would later claim that the incident had happened because he felt it was his duty to defend his fellow SS member as the policeman had forcibly pulled him from the ticket window. However the incident earned Deubel a rebuke from Himmler as it was widely discussed in Germany and even reported in sections of the overseas press.

Deubel officially left the concentration camp service on 31 March 1937, and subsequently went to work for the customs service. He reached the position of senior customs inspector in 1939 and was promoted to district customs commissioner in 1941, serving as leader of the customs border guard in occupied France.

== Post-war life ==
After the Second World War, Deubel was interned until 1948, albeit ultimately no charges were brought against him by the government of West Germany. He died in the Bavarian town of Dingolfing.

== Awards and ranks ==
- Iron Cross First and Second Class

Deubel's SS Ranks
Date	Rank
31 August 1926	SS-Scharführer
30 October 1928	SS-Sturmbannführer
1 February 1931	SS-Standartenführer
9 November 1934	SS-Oberführer
