= Hermann Pister =

Nazi commander of Buchenwald (1885–1948)

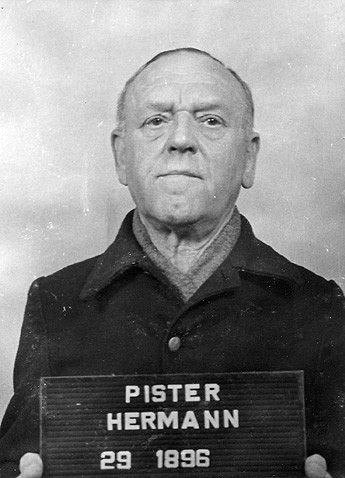
- Pister c. 1947
- Born: Hermann Franz Josef Pister; 21 February 1885; Lübeck, Germany
- Died: 28 September 1948 (aged 63); Landsberg am Lech, Germany
- Status: Deceased
- Motive: Nazism
- Conviction: War crimes
- Trial: Buchenwald trial
- Penalty: Death
- Military career
- Allegiance: German Empire; Nazi Germany
- Branch: Imperial German Navy; Schutzstaffel
- Service years: 1916–1918; 1932–1945
- Rank: SS-Oberführer
- Service number: 29892
- Commands: Hinzert concentration camp (1939–1941); Buchenwald concentration camp (1942–1945)
- Conflicts: World War I

Hermann Franz Josef Pister (21 February 1885 – 28 September 1948) was an SS-Oberführer (senior colonel) and commandant of Buchenwald concentration camp from 21 January 1942 until April 1945.

== Early life ==
Pister was the son of a financial secretary in Lübeck. He joined the German Imperial Navy in 1916 and served until the end of the war. In 1918 he began an apprenticeship as an auto mechanic and went on to become an automobile salesman and manager.

He joined the Nazi party (no. 918391) and the SS (No. 29892), being assigned to the SS Motor Echelon in 1932. In 1933 he was assigned to SS Motor Regiment Nineteen and in 1936 to SS Motor Regiment One. In 1937 he was assigned to the motor pool of Reichsführer-SS Heinrich Himmler.

== Buchenwald ==
Pister was given the command of Hinzert concentration camp and served there from 9 October 1939 to 21 December 1941. On 1 January 1942 he replaced Karl Otto Koch as commandant of Buchenwald.

The prisoners were ordered evacuated from Buchenwald in early April 1945 to prevent their liberation by Allied troops. Pister ordered the first group to leave on foot on 7 April 1945 to be sent to Dachau. This group was marched to the railroad station and placed in open boxcars. This train came to be known as the "Death Train". It took until 27 April for the train to arrive at Dachau with many aboard dying of starvation and illness. There was also evidence that the train had been strafed. SS-Obersturmführer Hans Merbach was placed in charge of the evacuation of Buchenwald and the train.

Pister was arrested by the Americans in 1945; put on trial for war crimes by the American Military Tribunal at Dachau with 30 other defendants where he was charged with participation in a "common plan" to violate the Laws and Usages of war of the Hague Convention of 1907 and the third Geneva Convention of 1929, in regard to the rights of Prisoners of War. The trial began on 11 April 1947. He was found guilty and sentenced to death by hanging. Pister died in Landsberg Prison of an acute heart attack on 28 September 1948.

Military offices
Preceded by None	Commandant of Hinzert concentration camp 9 October 1939 – December 1941	Succeeded by SS-Hauptsturmführer Egon Zill
Preceded by SS-Obersturmbannführer Karl-Otto Koch	Commandant of Buchenwald concentration camp 21 January 1942 – early April 1945	Succeeded by None
