= Lisa Ullrich =

German politician (1900–1986)

- Born: 12 August 1900; Odessa, Russia
- Died: 5 June 1986 (aged 85); East Berlin, East Germany
- Occupation: Politician
- Political party: KPD; SED
- Spouse: Adolf Dreßler (m. 1924; div. 1927)

Lisa Ullrich (12 August 1900 – 5 June 1986) was a German activist and politician (KPD, SED). She was elected to the national parliament (Reichstag) in July 1932, remaining a member till March 1933, after the Nazi take-over.

== Life ==
=== Provenance and early years ===
Elisabeth "Lisa" Ullrich was born in Odessa. Her father was a print worker. After the city's foundation in 1792 many thousands of ethnic Germans settled in Odessa, notably during the first decade of the nineteenth century, in order to escape the impact of the Napoleonic Wars. However, Lisa Ullrich's parents had arrived, much more recently, from Austria. The family moved to Riga in 1911 where Lisa, still only 11, found work in a textiles and garments factory while her younger brother attended the local elementary school. At the end of July 1914 war broke out between Germany and Russia (along with their respective allies) and in 1915 the family were expelled from Russia, ending up in Berlin where her father took work as a typesetter. Lisa Ullrich was by now an experienced seamstress. During the next few years she worked successively in the garments, metals, electric goods and foods sectors.

=== Pacifist and communist ===
In 1917, despite her youth and gender, she joined a trades union. Within the political left the decision by the Social Democratic Party (SPD) leadership in 1914 to implement what amounted to a parliamentary truce on voting funds for the war had been contentious from the outset and tensions only grew as austerity on the home front and slaughter on the battle front reached levels which very few had anticipated. In 1917 the SPD split over the issue of backing for the war, with the left-wing breakaway anti-war group taking the name Independent Social Democratic Party (" Unabhängige Sozialdemokratische Partei Deutschlands" / USPD). In March 1920 Lisa Ullrich joined the USPD. By this time, after more than a year characterised by a wave of revolutions, especially in the cities and towns, as suddenly discharged soldiers returned home to acute economic hardship, socialist politics were undergoing further reconfiguration. Within the USPD Ullrich was one of those actively pushing for a merger with the Communist Party which had been launched in Berlin, formally, at a congress held between 30 December 1918 and 1 January 1919. That objective was achieved in January 1920, after which she was a Communist Party member, undertaking various unpaid functions, politically active primarily among the women industrial workers in the Moabit quarter of Berlin. During 1922/23 she was actively involved in developing the party's Proletarian Control Commission movement ("Kontrollausschussbewegung").

=== Marriage and divorce ===
In 1924 Lisa Ullrich married the machinist and fellow-Communist Adolf Dreßler. According to one source her motive was to secure German citizenship. There is no sign that she was accompanied by her husband during her subsequent stay in Moscow, and in (or before) 1927 the marriage ended in divorce: sources on her subsequent career continue to identify Lisa Ullrich by her unmarried name.

=== Party officer ===
Later in 1924, in July, Ullrich participated as a delegate at the Fifth Congress of the Communist International ("Comintern") and in the Third International Conference of Women Communists, both held in Moscow. She was elected to the International Women's Secretariat of Comintern, a body in which she worked for the next two years under the leadership of the formidable Clara Zetkin. Returning to Germany in 1926, she involved herself in producing "Die Arbeiterin" ("The [female] worker"), the women's newspaper produced by the regional party leadership team of the Berlin-Brandenburg-Lausitz region. From 1927 she was working in the "Women's Department" of the Party Central Committee, which she headed up for a period in 1932/33. In 1929 she took the lead in preparing and organising the First National Congress of German Working Women, held in Berlin. In August 1930 she was back in Moscow where she took part in the Fifth Congress of the Profintern (Red International of Trades Unions / "Красный интернационал профсоюзов"). She then worked in the organisation between January 1931 till August 1932, based successively in Prague, Amsterdam and France.

=== Reichstag ===
In the first general election of 1932 she was elected a member of the German parliament (Reichstag), sitting as a Communist for Electoral District 20 (Cologne-Aachen). She was re-elected later that year in the November election. However, the Nazis took power in January 1933 and lost no time in transforming Germany into a one-party dictatorship. Political activity - except in support of the Nazi Party - was banned. Lisa Ullrich was one of those who participated in the (illegal) meeting of the party central committee held at the Ziegenhals cafe ("Sporthaus Ziegenhals") a short distance outside Berlin on 7 February 1933. The meeting would subsequently be celebrated as both the first and last meeting of the Communist Party Central Committee held in Nazi Germany. The Reichstag fire at the end of February 1933 was immediately blamed on "communists", and it became abundantly clear that communists, in particular, were in the authorities' sights. Ullrich nevertheless continued with her now illegal political activities among the working women of Berlin. In November 1933 the party leadership sent her to Magdeburg to take on the leadership of the local party branch. In Magdeburg she worked underground as an "instructor" for the party, using the cover name "Magda".

=== Nazi years ===
Sources differ as to the precise date of Ullrich's arrest, but it appears that she was detained in Magdeburg in July 1934, to be charged with "preparing high treason" ("Vorbereitung zum Hochverrat"). She faced trial in the Berlin district court on 20 January 1935 and was sentenced to a three-year prison term (of which more than half a year had already been served while in investigatory detention). She served the first part of her sentence at the women's prison in Jauer, but was transferred to the concentration camp at Moringen in March 1936. She was moved on to Lichtenburg soon afterwards. It was at Lichtenburg, in December 1937, that her arm was broken when she was forced by a guard to walk across an area of sheet ice. There was a recognition on the part of the camp authorities that the accident was the fault of the guard. Ullrich insisted that she needed medication and dietary supplements to compensate for the state of her body after years in custody, but to no effect. However, it was eventually agreed that she should visit the doctor in the village who put her arm in a plaster cast and told her to come back in a week. There were several further visits, at each of which the doctor briefly inspected the plaster and told her to come back in a week. Two SS guards escorted her and were present at the consultations. Eventually the doctor escorted Ullrich into an inner room, and when one of the guards placed a foot in the door to ensure that no consultation could take place unobserved the doctor angrily (if bravely) insisted that in his consulting room he was the one who set the rules. The guard backed off. When she and the doctor were alone together he agreed to write to the concentration camp authorities spelling out how she should be treated in order that the arm might mend. There were no more visits to the doctor in the village. Back in the camp she was now given carrots to eat and permitted to buy fruit, but any other instructions included in the doctor's letter to the camp authorities were ignored, and six months later, although the plaster cast had been removed, the broken arm was dangling uselessly at her side.

In the summer of 1938 the concentration camp received a visit from Heinrich Himmler, a senior and energetic member of the government whose responsibilities extended over a remarkably wide range of domestic administrative matters. Concentration camps were a responsibility to which he devoted much time and attention, and there was nothing particularly unusual about Himmler turning up, apparently unannounced, to inspect a concentration camp. He was accompanied by a number of senior Nazi paramilitaries ("SS" officials), each of them armed with a large pad of paper and a pen. Every word that Himmler uttered, along with other matters arising, was carefully written down. Lichtenburg at this time was used to house political opponents of the government. Himmler picked out a few inmates for an apparently impromptu meeting. Those selected included the wife of Mattach Wallek, a prominent trades union leader before 1933, and other wives of men known to Himmler, presumably, on account of their political activities in the past. Lisa Ullrich was also picked out, presumably of particular interest to the authorities because of her own record. It appears to have been at some stage during this visit that Himmler asked Ullrich what was wrong with her arm. During the "meeting" Himmler pointed out at some length how the Nazis had struggled to make life better for working people, and as details of the economic progress made by the country since 1933 were rehearsed the Communists were obliged to agree about many examples of improved living standards. The discussion even got to the point where Ullrich ventured that if the Nazis were acting out the agenda of the Communist Party so assiduously, then it was not clear why she and her comrades had spent up to six years in a concentration camp. Several communist inmates were indeed released back to their families then and there, with a handshake from the Reichsführer, but Lisa Ullrich was not among them.

In May 1939 a number of inmates were moved from Lichtenburg to the newly built concentration camp for women at Ravensbrück. Ullrich was held back and there was talk of sending her to a Berlin hospital to have her arm seen to, but nothing came of this and a few days later she too was transferred to Ravensbrück. Here, on 24 May 1939, she was summoned to see the camp supervisor because she had asked for a doctor. Ullrich stated that she had not asked for a doctor, but from the expressions on the faces of passing comrades and their raised fists it appeared they knew something that she did not. She was taken to a doctor and required to tell him about her arm, and whether she had any requirements. She replied that she had no requirements and that everything was fine. The conversation then turned to politics and she was told that she was about to be released. She would have to sign an undertaking that she would not involve herself in Marxist activities, but she had already received unequivocal instructions from the party that comrades required by the Nazi authorities to sign such an undertaking should do so, and would not find themselves seen as traitors to the party as a result. Ullrich signed the undertaking and was released from Ravensbrück.

After her release Ullrich returned to Berlin and supported herself as a seamstress and with warehouse work. Later she found a position as an accounts clerk, and also obtained jobs as a simultaneous translator. She resumed her "illegal antifascist work". It was only after August 1939, when some (though by no means all) of the details emerged of the astonishing non-aggression pact with the Soviet Union, which the government had been negotiating since April, that Ullrich arrived at an appreciation that her release in May, and that of several other comrades with good connections in Moscow, had been part of a diplomatic scene-setting exercise by Himmler, intended to show the Soviets that the Nazi government was softening its line, just a little, on Germany's own communist activists. Inevitably, however, she remained under intense surveillance following her release, which left her acutely nervous about venturing out onto the street, except for walking to and from her work. She was able to live quietly in a little house that her parents owned in the city. Because she had mastered Russian, she could know what was going on by listening (illegally) not merely to the German language broadcasts from Moscow but also to the Russian language ones, which she found gave a fuller picture. She also received instructions and information that came from Moscow for onward transmission to party comrades operating "underground" in Berlin, which she could translate where necessary and give to her sisters, who were not as closely observed by the authorities as she was, to be passed on beyond the walls of the little house. In this way she was able to continue making an important party-political contribution while remaining out of sight.

On 20 July 1944 an assassination attempt was made against Adolf Hitler. The dictator survived, but the leadership were badly unnerved: the régime had already prepared a list of several thousand names of political adversaries, many of them surviving former left wing politicians from the Weimar era, to be used in the event of an escalation in political tension on the home front. Lisa Ullrich's name was on it. She was one of approximately 5,000 people arrested overnight on 22/23 August 1944, and was returned to Ravensbrück. There she was deprived of the medical supplies necessary to treat her health problems. Within her "accommodation block" her fellow internees elected her as "block senior". Responding to an obvious and urgent need in a women's concentration camp, she organised a "Mother and child" facility, collecting a team of four fellow inmates, comprising two doctors from Germany and Czechoslovakia, a paediatrician from Czechoslovakia, and a baby nurse. At the time the camp contained an estimated 150 pregnant women, 100 mothers of infants, and 96 babies and infants. She later recalled the struggle to try and ensure that all the "kids" survived, although given the absence of basic necessities in the camp this proved "well nigh impossible".

=== Soviet occupation zone and German Democratic Republic ===
War ended early in May 1945. As the battered Nazi authorities rushed to clear the concentration camps ahead of the advancing Soviet and allied forces, women held at Ravensbrück were sent off on a so-called death march. The "detainees" were told they would find food at their destination, but rumours circulated among them that their destination was in fact a munitions plant that was scheduled to be blown up, so they walked as slowly as they could. They were intercepted and liberated on 1 May 1945 by units of the Red Army, advancing both from the east and from the German coast, to the north. Between May 1945 and October 1949 an area corresponding to approximately the central third of what had been Germany, including the regions surrounding Berlin, would be administered as the Soviet occupation zone. As a fluent Russian speaker with political credentials that had suddenly become impeccable, Lisa Ullrich was one of the first to find herself appointed to public office. Party activity was no longer illegal and she reactivated her Communist Party membership. By the end of May 1945 she was installed as the mayor in the central Berlin quarter of Grünau.

Following the contentious political merger which in April 1946 created the Socialist Unity Party ("Sozialistische Einheitspartei Deutschlands" / SED) Lisa Ullrich was among the thousands of communists who immediately signed their party membership across what would become, after October 1949, the ruling party in a new kind of one-party dictatorship, the German Democratic Republic (East Germany). At the end of July 1946 she took a leading position with the women's section of the party's Central Secretariat. She moved on from the Grünau mayoral position to a role with the National Administration for Labour and Welfare, playing a leading part in the government's "Rescue the Children!" ("Rettet die Kinder!") programme. In 1948 she undertook a six-month training at the party's Karl Marx Academy in Berlin, after which she was involved till 1964 with the Instruction Department at the national administration for the "Machinery Rental Stations" ("Maschinenausleihstation" / MAS) within what became after 1951 the East German Ministry for Forestry and Agriculture. Under the socialist economic structure imposed during the later 1940s farming land was taken over by the state and divided into agricultural co-operatives. Farm machinery was not owned by or permanently assigned to any individual co-operative, but centrally controlled and rented out according to seasonal requirements, which meant that the MAS was a critical component in the overall economy of food production. Between 1960 and 1970 she was part of a research based working group focused on beef cattle breeding.

== Awards and honours ==
- 1969 Patriotic Order of Merit in silver
- 1973 Patriotic Order of Merit in gold
- 1980 Patriotic Order of Merit Gold Clasp

Because of the sequence in which these awards were normally made, it is extremely likely that at some point between 1954 and 1969 she was also a recipient of the Patriotic Order of Merit in bronze.
