= Hans Helwig =

German politician (1881–1952)

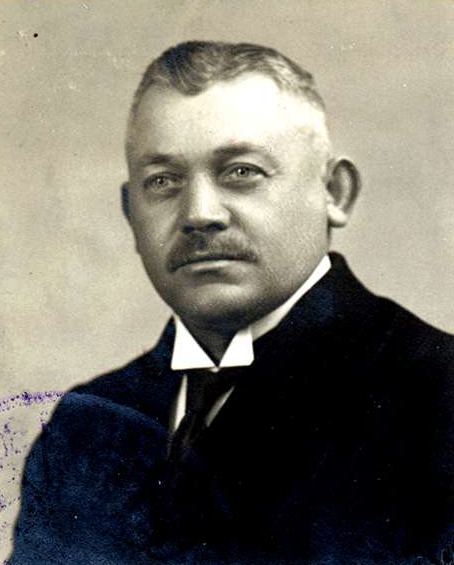
- Helwig c. 1933
- Born: 25 September 1881; Hemsbach, Grand Duchy of Baden, Germany
- Died: 24 August 1952 (aged 70) Hemsbach
- Allegiance: German Empire (to 1918); Nazi Germany
- Branch: Imperial German Army; Schutzstaffel
- Service years: 1901–1918; 1933–1945
- Rank: SS-Brigadeführer
- Commands: Lichtenburg concentration camp Sachsenhausen concentration camp
- Conflicts: World War I World War II
- Other work: Organisation Todt

Hans Helwig (25 September 1881 – 24 August 1952) was a German Nazi Party politician, World War I veteran, Schutzstaffel general and Nazi concentration camp commandant. An early member of the Nazi movement he fulfilled a number of roles within Nazism down the years. He was born and died in Hemsbach.

== Military service ==
The son of a forest ranger and the youngest of 15 children Helwig apprenticed as a bricklayer in his home village of Hemsbach. Discontented with life as a bricklayer the 19-year-old Helwig enlisted in the German Imperial Army in 1901. He rose to the rank of master sergeant in an infantry regiment before leaving in early 1914 to work as a court clerk. Helwig was only a few months out of the army when World War I broke out, prompting him to re-enlist. Returning to the same battalion Helwig saw action on both the Western and Eastern Fronts.

== Joining the Nazi Party ==
After the end of the war, Helwig returned to his post with the court before eventually moving on to a role as a minor official at the German Ministry of Justice. Although his personal position was largely untouched, Helwig nonetheless became deeply resentful of the situation in his native Baden which was under French occupation. An admirer of Adolf Hitler, his beliefs caused him trouble professionally and he was suspended from his job following the Beer Hall putsch, which he had been heard to praise at work. By this time Helwig was already officially a member of the Sturmabteilung (SA), having initially joined the Deutschvölkischer Schutz und Trutzbund after the war.

Suspended from work, Helwig was able to devote more of his time to the SA and the Nazi Party. A founder of the local branch of the reorganised Nazi Party in 1925, he was elected a city councilman not long after. At the time in Baden, Nazi politics were dominated by a personality clash between local strongmen Heinrich Himmler and Robert Heinrich Wagner, a struggle in which Helwig eventually sided with Himmler, leaving the SA for the Schutzstaffel (SS) in 1929. Already 48 and generally considered to be of low intelligence, it was unclear what use he could be to the SS but nonetheless he was received enthusiastically both due to his friendship with Himmler and the fact that he had put loyalty to the Nazi Party above his own finances by getting suspended from work due to his Nazism.

== Political career ==
Helwig initially followed a career in Nazi politics, following a personal endorsement to Adolf Hitler from Himmler. In the July 1932 election he was returned as a deputy to the Reichstag from electoral constituency 32 (Baden). There is no record of him accomplishing anything during his brief spell in the institution. In the meantime, his old rival Wagner had re-established his control of Baden, Himmler having long since departed to serve as Reichsführer-SS, and ensured that Helwig would not be a candidate in the November 1932 election, instead ensuring his demotion to the Landtag der Republik Baden, a body that was abolished following the Nazi takeover.

== Camp commandant ==
On account of his long military service, he initially served the SS as voluntary commander of a battalion and then a regiment. Following the Nazi takeover he was then appointed a governor of Bruchsal prison, a role that he did not last long due to the mentally taxing nature of the work. Following a nervous breakdown he retired from SS duty but was dismayed to find his pension only stretched to 202 Marks a month. Helwig recovered from his health issues rapidly and sought to return to the SS. He was readmitted reluctantly, largely on the basis of his long service (which entitled him to the Golden Nazi Party Badge) and loyalty.

By this time it was unclear what role Helwig could possibly fill in the SS and a superior officer had written a personal letter to Himmler to this effect. Within the letter it was suggested that his prison experience might make it possible for him to command a concentration camp and Himmler acted on this suggestion, and made him commandant of the women's camp at Lichtenburg. In July 1937 he succeeded Karl Otto Koch as commandant of Sachsenhausen concentration camp and was soon being put forward as a candidate for promotion by Theodor Eicke, who had initially been reluctant to have Helwig as one of his men. However Helwig did blot his copybook when it was discovered that he boasted of his atrocities at Sachsenhausen to a group of non-Germans after getting drunk in a bar, breaking protocol about keeping concentration camp activities quiet. Indeed, as was the case for all of the commandants at Sachsenhausen, Helwig's command was noted for its viciousness.

Helwig lost his position the following year over a somewhat pedantic clash between the SS hierarchy and Justice Minister Franz Gürtner over a failure to obey protocol. An inmate of Sachsenhausen, Johannes Winiarz, was given a forced vasectomy at the camp but it emerged that the operation had not been approved by a judge and Winiarz had had no chance to appeal, both of which were laid down as essential in such cases. Himmler put the blame on Eicke who in turn argued that it had been Helwig who had mixed up the orders, having become confused by a sudden influx of new prisoners at the time. Eicke told Himmler that the 57-year-old Helwig was "totally decrepit ... both mentally and physically" and recommended he be removed as commandant. He was replaced by Hermann Baranowski soon afterwards.

== Later years ==
Helwig appealed to be allowed to continue but neither Eicke nor Himmler would be moved. Given a 5000 Mark severance in order to convince him to leave he returned to Hemsbach. His standing as a party loyalist ensured that the SS continued to help him find employment and after a few failed attempts he found a role in the Organisation Todt that suited his talents. Based on the Eastern Front, he oversaw the building of a fuel camp that also doubled as a place to hold Soviet prisoners of war. The veteran, who by this time was an SS-Brigadeführer despite having previously been described by Eicke as not officer material, finished the war as the liaison officer between the northern command of the Wehrmacht and Himmler's headquarters.

Helwig, who remained an active member of his local Protestant church in Hemsbach throughout his SS career despite the faith being officially discouraged, died in his hometown in 1952 before any legal proceedings could be brought against him.

== Ranks and promotions ==
Helwig's SS Ranks
Date	Rank
28 May 1929	SS-Anwärter
24 October 1929	SS-Truppführer
10 April 1930	SS-Sturmführer
30 November 1930	SS-Sturmbannführer
13 July 1931	SS-Standartenführer
12 September 1937	SS-Oberführer
5 June 1944	SS-Brigadeführer

Military offices
Preceded by SS-Standartenführer Hermann Baranowski	Commandant of Lichtenburg concentration camp November 1936 – July 1937	Succeeded by SS-Sturmbannführer Alexander Piorkowski
Preceded by SS-Standartenführer Karl Otto Koch	Commandant of Sachsenhausen concentration camp July 1937 – January 1938	Succeeded by SS-Oberführer Hermann Baranowski
