= Arthur Rödl =

Schutzstaffel officer, Nazi concentration camp commandant

- Born: 13 June 1898; Munich, German Empire
- Died: 5 April 1945 (aged 46); Stettin, Nazi Germany
- Military career
- Allegiance: Nazi Germany
- Branch: Waffen SS
- Service years: 1928–1945
- Rank: Standartenführer
- Commands: Buchenwald Concentration Camp, Gross-Rosen Concentration Camp
- Conflicts: World War II

Arthur Rödl (13 June 1898 – 5 April 1945) was a German Standartenführer (Colonel) in the Waffen-SS and a Nazi concentration camp commandant.

Rödl was born into a Catholic family. His father worked as a messenger and his mother ran a newsstand. The stand closed when Rödl was ten, and he was told by his mother that it had shut down as she could not compete with a nearby stand run by a Jew. The incident helped to instill a sense of anti-Semitism in the young Rödl, who was involved in extreme nationalist groups from an early age. Rödl was apprenticed to a blacksmith when World War I broke out. He soon enlisted in the German Imperial Army by forging his age on his documents after initially being rejected for being only 16. He was seriously wounded at least once during the war, and was demobilized at the age of 20. He eventually worked for the post office.

Rödl quickly returned to far right activism and joined the Bund Oberland in 1920. His activities brought him frequent reprimands at work, for taking time off to travel with other Bund members to fight Poles in Upper Silesia, and using his window at the post office to hand out propaganda leaflets. When it became clear that he had participated in the Beer Hall Putsch, he was dismissed by the post office.

By this time a member of the Nazi Party, Rödl sought employment at the party's Brown House headquarters, where he found a job as a mimeograph operator. He volunteered for the SS in 1928, and in 1934 was switched to a full-time member of the organisation. He served with the SS-Totenkopfverbände, initially at Lichtenburg and then at Sachsenhausen, although he found advancement difficult because he was seen by his SS superiors as naive and unsubtle.

Rödl was noted for his brusque manner, an attribute that was less than ideal for an SS man at Sachsenhausen, because it sometimes hosted overseas dignitaries due to its proximity to Berlin. For that reason, Theodor Eicke recommended Rödl's removal from his position in 1937.

Rödl finally began to rise through the ranks following a transfer to Buchenwald, where he was deputy to commandant Karl-Otto Koch. In that role, he was given a largely free hand to indulge his cruel side, with Koch placing no restrictions on his men's actions. An example of this occurred late on 1 January 1939, when Rödl lined up the inmates, picked five at random, and had them stripped, tied to posts, and whipped until morning, in tune with the prisoner orchestra. Eventually he was given command of the Gross-Rosen concentration camp, although he was not suited to the role. One of his successors, Johannes Hassebroek, commented that Rödl was a "cruel, corrupt and drunken man". He ultimately reached the rank of Standartenführer, despite consistently testing for low intelligence. Wilhelm Gideon replaced him as camp commandant on 16 September 1942.

He ended his service in Ukraine as part of the occupation police, before committing suicide with a hand grenade when defeat for Nazi Germany looked inevitable.
