= Wilhelm Gideon =

German Schutzstaffel officer (1898–1977)

- Born: 15 November 1898; Oldenburg, Grand Duchy of Oldenburg, German Empire
- Died: 23 February 1977
- Military career
- Allegiance: Nazi Germany
- Branch: Schutzstaffel (SS)
- Service years: 1933–1945
- Rank: SS-Hauptsturmführer
- Commands: Gross-Rosen concentration camp
- Awards: Iron Cross, 2nd class

Wilhelm Gideon (15 November 1898 – 23 February 1977) was a Schutzstaffel (SS) officer and Nazi concentration camp commandant.

A native of Oldenburg, Gideon began work as a trainee engineer but had his studies ended by the outbreak of World War I, when he volunteered for service in the German Imperial Army.

Gideon enlisted in the SS in 1933 (member number 88,657) and the Nazi Party in 1937 (member 4,432,258). He had various posts in the SS, initially being stationed with the 9th SS-Reiterstandarte (cavalry) from 1934 to 1939. Following this, he was moved to the 3rd SS Division Totenkopf until 1942, after which he was briefly attached to the SS-Wirtschafts-Verwaltungshauptamt. He also served for a short period at Neuengamme concentration camp and as the administrator of the 88th SS-Standarte in Hamburg.

Gideon had been identified by Oswald Pohl, the head of the concentration camp system, as a reliable SS officer and was promoted to SS-Hauptsturmführer. He was appointed commandant of Gross-Rosen concentration camp on 16 September 1942, in succession to Arthur Rödl, and held the post until 10 October 1943, when Johannes Hassebroek succeeded him. His final post was on the staff of Günther Pancke, the Higher SS and Police Leader in occupied Denmark, until Germany's surrender in 1945. Legal proceedings against Gideon were dismissed in 1962.

Gideon was found in 1975 when Israeli historian Tom Segev interviewed him for his book Soldiers of Evil, a study of concentration camp commandants. However, after initially cooperating with Segev, Gideon terminated the interview when he suddenly claimed that he was a different person who happened to be named Wilhelm Gideon rather than the former commandant of Gross-Rosen.

== Literature ==
- Orth, Karin: Die Konzentrationslager-SS. dtv, München 2004, ISBN 3-423-34085-1.
- Tom Segev: Die Soldaten des Bösen. Zur Geschichte der KZ-Kommandanten. Rowohlt, Reinbek bei Hamburg 1995, ISBN 3-499-18826-0.
- Ernst Klee: Das Personenlexikon zum Dritten Reich: Wer war was vor und nach 1945. Fischer-Taschenbuch-Verlag, Frankfurt am Main 2005. ISBN 3-596-16048-0.
- Wilhelm Gideon (in Polish)
