= Walter Eisfeld =

German SS officer (1905–1940)

Walter Eisfeld (born 11 July 1905 in Halle, Saxony-Anhalt – died 3 April 1940 in Dachau) was a German SS functionary and concentration camp commandant during the Nazi era. Eisfeld had been a member of the Artamanen-Gesellschaft, a völkisch back-to-the-land movement, before becoming involved with the Nazi Party and its organisations.

Whilst Schutzhaftlagerführer at Sachsenhausen in January 1940 he was sent to Silesia to examine the possibility of establishing new camps. Against Eisfeld's advice, a site at Auschwitz was chosen.

Having risen to the rank of Sturmbannführer, Eisfeld succeeded Hermann Baranowski as commandant at Sachsenhausen concentration camp before being replaced by Hans Loritz. Heinrich Himmler visited Sachsenhausen in early 1940 and, seeing disciplinary problems amongst the guards, ordered Eisfeld to be replaced as camp commandant. He was sent to command the new Neuengamme concentration camp, at the time a sub-camp of Sachsenhausen.

Eisfeld died of pneumonia at Dachau while attending a ceremony in which he was to be awarded a Nazi Party Badge.
