= Ernst Grube =

German teacher and Holocaust survivor (born 1932)

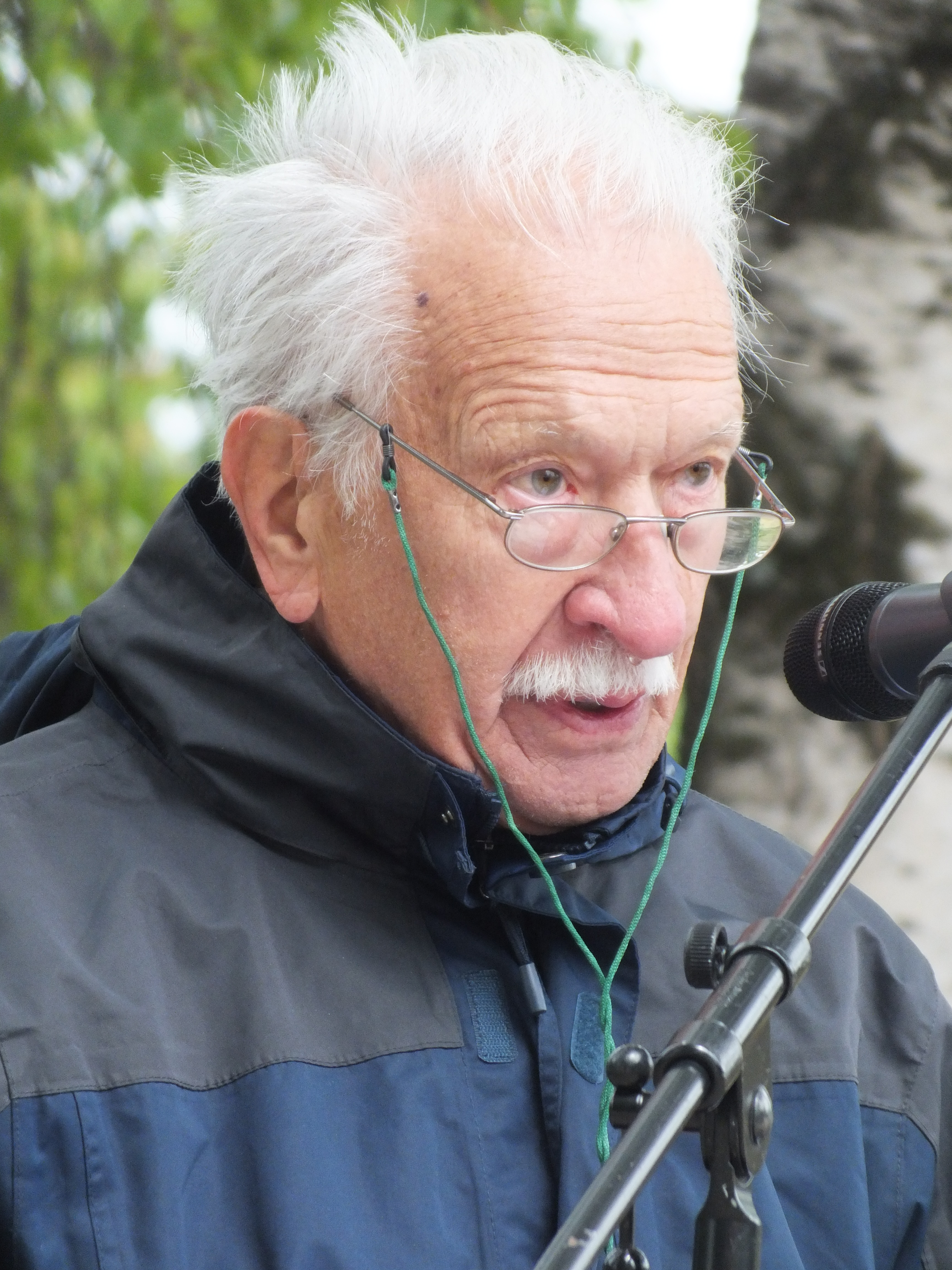
Grube in 2019

Ernst Grube (born 13 December 1932) is a German teacher and Holocaust survivor. He never tires of presenting – "up to a hundred times a year" – the story of his childhood in Nazi Germany. In contrast, he speaks very little of what happened after his release from the Theresienstadt concentration camp and his return to Munich in May 1945: his involvement with the FDJ (loosely "Young Communists") and the Communist Party itself during the period when it had been banned in West Germany. His trades union activism, his campaigning against re-armament during the 1950s and in favour of reunification receive little coverage. Several times, his activism led him to violent police encounters and arrest. A leafleting campaign he undertook for the (illegal) Communist Party led to several months of solitary confinement and a conviction from a federal court.

== Life ==
=== Childhood as a "Half-Jew" under the Nazis ===
Ernst Grube was born in Munich. Franz Grube, his father, came from a Protestant family: he was a commercial artist (Note: German language sources identify Grube's father's profession as that of a "Malermeister" (literally, "Master painter"), a term which has no direct translation that is widely and unambiguously understood among English-language readers.) and a committed Communist. His mother Clementine was Jewish. Ernst had a brother, named Werner, and sister, named Ruth. A month after he was born, following several years of intensifying political polarisation and months of parliamentary deadlock, the Nazi Party took power and lost no time in transforming Germany into a one-party dictatorship. Antisemitism, until then no more than a rich stream of shrill slogans for populist politicians, suddenly became a core underpinning of government strategy. The Grubes lived in an apartment in Herzog-Max-Strasse, close to the city's Old Main Synagogue ("Alte Hauptsynagoge München"). The Synagogue would be one of the first in Germany to be destroyed by the Nazi Regime: this happened in June 1938. Directly after that the authorities determined that the "Jewish houses" in the quarter were to be cleared for re-use ("entmietet"), forcing the family to leave their apartment. The three children were separated from their parents. Their father had been classified as a Communist and their mother as Jewish. Ernst, Werner and Ruth were taken to a former orphanage, now being used as a Jewish children's home, in the Schwabing quarter. Initially the children's home seemed to afford a certain level of protection from the more brutish manifestation of Nazi antisemitism, but that changed abruptly in October 1941, after which the children at the home were required to wear the yellow badge. They were no longer permitted to attend school or use the trams, and they were no longer admitted to cinemas. Identified by the "Jew star", Grube was open to taunts in the street of "Hau ab, Saujud'!" (loosely "Get away, pig Jew"). It was, as he later recalled, a brutally sudden end to his boyhood. He was a few weeks short of his ninth birthday.

Several years of uncertainty came to an end one evening in November 1941 when 23 of the children and their "aunts", as the children called their carers, were put on a bus and deported to Lithuania where they were shot. Those deported included Ernst Grube's eight-year old childhood sweetheart Anita. The Grube children were relatively lucky. Their father had refused to divorce his Jewish wife and for this reason the authorities decided that, as "half-Jews", they fell outside the classification applied to those being deported. During the first part of 1942, the home was closed and those who had been left behind were taken to a "cramped damp barrack-camp" in Munich's Milbertshofen quarter. In 1943, Clementine Grube gave permission for her children to be baptised as Christians so that their racial classification could be reassessed by the authorities. A memory from this time that endures particularly powerfully involved an allied air-raid over Munich. Grube joined the rush to the large air-raid shelter opposite the secondary school and the main railway station, but someone spotted his "Jew star" and he was prevented from entering. He was obliged to seek shelter among the bushes in the nearby botanic gardens. He survived as the bombs fell all around him, but only just. Subsequently, the three siblings were moved to the so-called "Jews camp" in the Berg am Laim quarter. Then, towards the end of 1943, the children were sent back to their parents. In February 1945 the letter arrived instructing them to report for deportation. The children and their mother were deported to the Theresienstadt concentration camp. Only the liberation of Theresienstadt by the Red Army on 8 May 1945 saved their lives.

=== Antiestablishment activism after the war ===
World War II ended in Europe, formally, in May 1945, leaving the western two thirds of Germany divided into four military occupation zones. Bavaria was under American occupation. Grube returned to Munich (the Bavarian capital) in June 1945 and, like his father, worked as a painter. His schooling had been interrupted during Nazi rule, but now he was able to complete the school curricula and pass his Abitur (school final exams) which opened the way to university-level education. He went on to train as a school teacher, the profession by which he subsequently supported himself. In May 1949 the US occupation zone was merged with the British zone and the French zone (but not with the increasingly cut off Soviet occupation zone) and relaunched as the US sponsored German Federal Republic (West Germany). For Grube it would take several decades before he could speak openly about life under the Nazis.

In postwar Munich Grube gained an acute sense of the way in which old National Socialists were integrated into the power structures of the new democracy, doing what they could to prevent the lessons of fascism from being passed on to new generations. He found himself regularly participating in the political opposition movements of the day. He became actively involved with trades unionism, in the Free German Youth ("Freie Deutsche Jugend" /FDJ) and in the Communist Party. The FDJ emerged in the Soviet occupation zone (after October 1949 the German Democratic Republic / East Germany) as the youth wing of the ruling Socialist Unity Party ("Sozialistische Einheitspartei Deutschlands"/ SED) which had, under the Soviets, effectively replaced the Communist Party in 1946. In the western zones – after 1949 West Germany – the FDJ gained very little political traction, and it was banned in 1951. The Communist Party also failed to recover its pre-1933 status as a significant political force in West Germany where, especially after 1949, it was almost universally identified as a proxy for the imperialist ambitions of the Soviet Union. In August 1956 the Communist Party was banned in West Germany by the Federal Constitutional Court which created additional problems for a small number of West German citizens – of whom Ernst Grube was one – who actively supported it. In the early 1950s Grube was engaged in street protests against West German re-armament and against new laws, highly contentious in Bavaria at that time, concerning shop opening hours. There are reports that he was "repeatedly beaten up by the police". It was during a trades union street protest held in one of Munich's main shopping streets, the Kaufingerstraße, against extending shop opening hours, that in 1953 Ernst Grube was arrested by the police. "The policemen beat us up right there in the middle of the street," he later recalled, "I put my hands over my head for protection". (Note: "Die Polizisten haben uns mitten auf der Straße verprügelt, ich habe schützend meine Hände über den Kopf gehalten") This time Grube was sentenced to a seven-month jail term for "resisting state authority" ("Widerstands gegen die Staatsgewalt"). He served out his sentence in Munich's vast Stadelheim Prison ("Justizvollzugsanstalt München").

The 1956 banning in West Germany of the Communist Party led, indirectly, to a further prison term for Grube. He was caught distribution copies of "Freies Volk", an illegal party newspaper at the Munich courthouse complex ("Justizpalast"), and was convicted in 1958 or 1959 for violating the ban on the Communist Party ("wegen Verstoßes gegen das KPD-Verbot"). This time he received a one-year jail term from the Federal Court of Justice, which included nine months in solitary confinement.

By the early 1970s, Grube was working as a vocational teacher. The ban on the Communist Party of Germany was still in force, but comrades had sought to evade the ban in 1968 by founding a new party called the German Communist Party (Deutsche Kommunistische Partei / DKP)]]. Ernst Grube joined up. In 1970, it remained unclear how the authorities in West Germany (and, more specifically for Grube, in conservative Bavaria) would react to the development. (In the event, the semantic conceit worked: the DKP endures, though it has yet to achieve any sort of break-through with the electorate.) When it became known to his employers in the state controlled education sector that Grube was a DKP member he was faced with a "professional ban" – effectively he was to lose his job because of his party membership. The authorities were, it appeared, clumsily seeking to avoid the radicalisation of students. For anyone familiar with the twelve Nazi years Grube's situation immediately called to mind the infamous Law for the Restoration of the Professional Civil Service ("Gesetz zur Wiederherstellung des Berufsbeamtentums"), passed by the government in April 1933, which had removed Jews and Communists from their jobs across a wide range of public sector departments (including education). It was only when Ernst Grube turned up at the city hall and placed the yellow "Jew star" with which he had been issued in 1941 on the desk of the responsible official that he authorities changed their collective mind. The decision to dismiss him was revoked without a court hearing, which one commentator described later as "a nationwide one-timer" ("ein bundesweit einmaliger Fall").

=== Public witness in a reunified Germany ===
At some point around 1990 Ernst Grube began to make testifying to his experiences as a survivor of National Socialist racism the focus of his life's work. Since then he has conducted countless school classes on visits round the Dachau concentration camp and engaged in structured discussions at schools and colleges designed to raise awareness of the dangers around a resurgence of Fascism. Now in his 80s, he remains politically engaged, primarily in opposition to Neonazis and those he identifies as re-writers of history.

== Film ==
- Ingeborg Weber, Christel Priemer: Ernst Grube - Zeitzeuge. Von einem, der nicht aufgibt.

== Memoires ==
- "Den Stern, den tragt Ihr nicht". Kindheitserinnerungen an die Judenverfolgung in München, in: Dachauer Hefte, 9 (1993), S. 3-13.

== Literature ==
- Angelika Baumann, Jüdisches Leben in München. Geschichtswettbewerb 1993/94, München 1995.
- Andreas Heusler/Andrea Sinn (Hrsg.), Die Erfahrung des Exils: Vertreibung, Emigration und Neuanfang. Ein Münchner Lesebuch, Berlin/Boston 2015.
- Klaus Holz, Die Verneinung des Judentums: Antisemitismus als religiöse und säkulare Waffe, Münster 2009.
- Christian Kuchler (Hrsg.), NS-Propaganda im 21. Jahrhundert: zwischen Verbot und öffentlicher Auseinandersetzung, Köln/Weimar/Wien 2014.
- Konrad Löw, Deutsche Schuld 1933-1945? Die ignorierten Antworten der Zeitzeugen, München 2011.
- Julius Hans Schoeps, Leben im Land der Täter, Berlin 2001.
- Studienkreis zur Erforschung und Vermittlung der Geschichte des Widerstandes 1933-1945 (Hrsg.), Widerstand gegen den Nationalsozialismus. Perspektiven der Vermittlung. Tagung vom 17.-18.03.2007 in Frankfurt am Main, Wiesbaden 2007.
