= Günther Tamaschke =

Nazi commandant (1896–1959)

- Born: 26 February 1896; Berlin, German Empire
- Died: 14 October 1959 (aged 63); Uhingen, West Germany
- Occupations: Commandant of the Lichtenburg and Ravensbrück concentration camps
- Political party: Nazi Party
- Spouse: Emmy Hirschberg

Günther Tamaschke (26 February 1896 – 14 October 1959) was a Nazi German SS-Standartenführer and commandant of the Lichtenburg and Ravensbrück concentration camps. He was never tried for his role in the Holocaust.

== Early life ==
Günther Tamaschke was born the son of a merchant. Tamaschke passed his Notabitur, a wartime emergency high school diploma that allowed one to graduate early provided that he then serve in the military. He then volunteered for the German Army in 1914. From 1914, he was employed in various units during the First World War and came under French captivity during the Battle of the Somme in 1916. Tamaschke returned to Berlin in March 1920 and took part in the Kapp Putsch. After that, he joined the Freikorps. After three semesters, he left the Handelshochschule Berlin and completed his training as a banker. Tamaschke married and became a partner at his father-in-law's wholesale store in late 1922. Politically, Tamaschke committed himself to the German Völkisch Freedom Party and was the founder of the Berlin branch of the party's Officers Bund. Tamaschke broke up his household in 1930, and quit working in his father-in-law's business at the end of 1932. After a period of unemployment, Tamaschke found a job in the district office in Neukölln.

== Nazi SS career in concentration camps ==
He joined the NSDAP (Nazi Party member number 36,978) in 1926, and the SS (member number 851); he was one of the first members of the Berlin SS in 1927. Tamaschke rose to the rank of SS-Standartenführer by mid-September 1935.

Through the actions of Kurt Daluege, Tamaschke was made Schutzhaftlagerführer in the Dachau concentration camp and remained in this position until the beginning of 1935. Under Theodor Eicke, the Inspector of Concentration Camps, Tamaschke rose to become head of the Politische Abteilung in the Concentration Camps Inspectorate (CCI). Through Eicke, with whom he had a special relationship of trust, Tamaschke was employed as the director (Lagerdirektor) of the newly established women's camp (Frauenkonzentrationslager) Lichtenburg starting on 1 December 1937. As early as December 1938, he was involved in establishing Ravensbrück concentration camp, a concentration camp for women and children, and stayed on the construction site at Fürstenberg/Havel. After the dissolution of the Lichtenburg concentration camp, Tamaschke moved with his staff to the newly built concentration camp at Ravensbrück, where he retained his position as Lagerdirektor, in May 1939.

By August 1939 Tamaschke was relieved of his duties as director of Ravensbrück concentration camp and released in early September 1939 from the SS-Totenkopfverbände. The reason was Tamaschke's private life. Tamaschke, who was married and had at least one child, began an affair with an Aufseherin (female guard). Since the affair had become public, and Tamaschke's wife had complained to Heinrich Himmler's personal staff, and given the fact that Tamaschke paid her no sustenance, Tamaschke lost the trust of Eicke, and he was removed from his post. His marriage ended in divorce by 1940. In September 1939, he moved to the Land Office near Prague. At the start of January 1942, Tamaschke was dismissed from the SS at Himmler's instigation, because as a trustee in the private sector, Tamaschke had been enriching himself with Jewish assets gained from Aryanization. Himmler processed this dismissal in March 1944, retroactively effective as of January 1942, as the allegations against Tamaschke proved to be untenable according to Himmler's findings. Tamaschke had been reprimanded for attempting to buy the Jewish-owned Czech company Nalus and Mansfeld, something which Himmler described in his official reprimand as Tamaschke taking "advantage of your position as an SS officer in order to lay your hands on a commercial enterprise you could not gain possession of in any other way".

Subsequently, Tamaschke served in the Heer and was still on the staff of the SS-Oberabschnitt Böhmen-Mähren in October 1944.

== Post-war ==
After the war's end, Tamaschke last resided in Uhingen, where he died on 14 October 1959.

== Personal life ==
Tamaschke's first marriage would end in divorce, although Tamaschke's decision to stop alimony payments led to his being disciplined by the SS as any such scandal was seen as bringing dishonour on the organisation. He subsequently remarried, his second wife being Emmy Hirschberg, an office clerk from Sudetenland. The marriage had initially been delayed when an investigation uncovered that Hirschberg's grandfather had committed suicide and that two of her uncles were involved in left-wing politics. Eventually, the marriage was allowed to take place.

== Bibliography ==
- Ernst Klee: Das Personenlexikon zum Dritten Reich: Wer war was vor und nach 1945. Fischer-Taschenbuch-Verlag, Frankfurt am Main 2005, ISBN 3-596-16048-0.
- Karin Orth: Die Konzentrationslager-SS. dtv, München 2004, ISBN 3-423-34085-1.
- Silke Schäfer: Zum Selbstverständnis von Frauen im Konzentrationslager. Das Lager Ravensbrück. Berlin 2002 (Dissertation as pdf)
- Tom Segev: Soldiers of Evil: The Commandants of the Nazi Concentration Camps (1988, ISBN 0-07-056058-7)
- Johannes Tuchel: Konzentrationslager: Organisationsgeschichte und Funktion der Inspektion der Konzentrationslager 1934–1938. (= Schriften des Bundesarchivs, Band 39). H. Boldt, 1991, ISBN 3-7646-1902-3.

Military offices
Preceded by None	Director of Lichtenburg concentration camp December 1937 – May 1939	Succeeded by None
Preceded by None	Commandant of Ravensbrück concentration camp May 1939 – August 1939	Succeeded by SS-Sturmbannführer Max Koegel
