= Hermann Baranowski =

German Nazi politician and military figure (1884–1940)

Hermann Baranowski (11 June 1884 in Schwerin – 5 February 1940 in Aue) was a German politician and military figure. A member of the Nazi Party, he is best known as the commandant of two German concentration camps of the SS Death's Head unit.

In April 1900, at the age of fifteen, he volunteered for the navy and later fought in the First World War, serving aboard the SMS Moltke. In 1912 he married August Dibbern with whom he had two children, a boy and a girl. In 1930 he was discharged as a lieutenant and then worked first as an office clerk in Kiel and later as a sales representative in Hamburg.

Baranowski joined the National Socialist German Workers' Party (Nazi Party) in 1930. The following year he signed up for the SS (SS #24009). His first appointment was as the leader of the 4th SS Standarte in Hamburg-Altona. In March 1936 Himmler appointed him commandant of the Lichtenburg concentration camp. However, he was soon removed, demoted and sent as a Lagerführer (compound leader) at Dachau concentration camp.

However, in 1938 he was promoted to Schutzhaftlagerführer at Dachau concentration camp. He served as the commandant (SS-Oberführer) of Sachsenhausen concentration camp from May 1938 until September 1939. He died at Aue in 1940.

He was noted to be especially sadistic. However, Rudolf Höss, commandant at Auschwitz, described Baranowski as:

very strict and hard, but of a scrupulous sense of fair play and fanatical sense of duty. As a very old SS leader and National Socialist he became my role model. I constantly saw in him a grander reflection of myself. He also had movements where his good nature, his soft heart revealed themselves, and yet he was hard and uncompromisingly strict in all matters of duty. So he constantly brought home to me how the hard 'must' demanded by the SS had to silence all soft stirrings.

— Höss,

Military offices
Preceded by SS-Standartenführer Otto Reich	Commandant of Lichtenburg concentration camp April 1936 – October 1936	Succeeded by SS-Standartenführer Hans Helwig
Preceded by SS-Oberführer Hans Helwig	Commandant of Sachsenhausen concentration camp February 1938 – September 1939	Succeeded by SS-Oberführer Hans Loritz
