= Max Koegel =

Nazi officer (1895–1946)

Otto Max Koegel
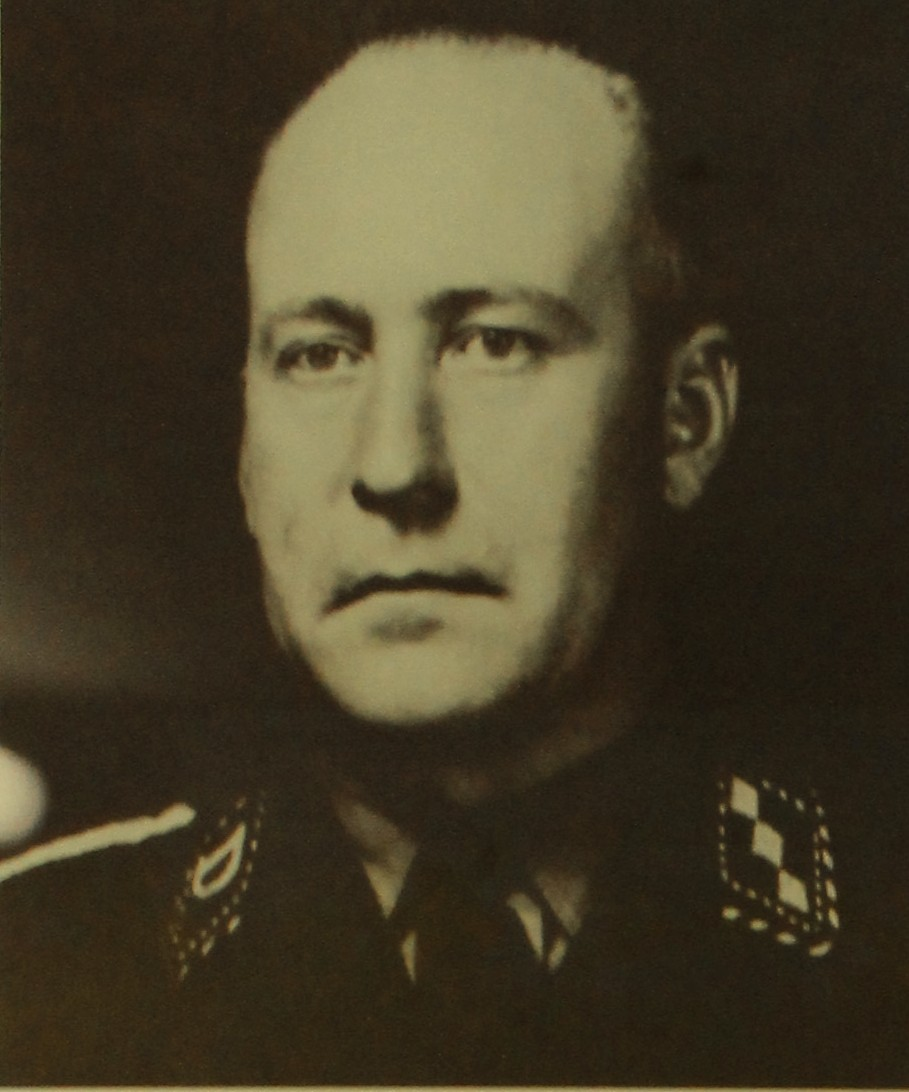
- Born: 16 October 1895; Füssen, Kingdom of Bavaria, German Empire
- Died: 27 June 1946 (aged 50) Schwabach, Allied-occupied Germany
- Allegiance: German Empire; Weimar Republic; Nazi Germany
- Branch: Schutzstaffel
- Service years: 1916–1945
- Rank: SS-Obersturmbannführer
- Commands: Lichtenburg concentration camp Ravensbrück concentration camp Majdanek concentration camp Flossenbürg concentration camp
- Awards: World War I Iron Cross 2. Class; War Merit Cross with Swords; SS-Honour Ring; Cross of Honor

Otto Max Koegel (16 October 1895 – 27 June 1946) was a Nazi officer who served as a commander at Lichtenburg, Ravensbrück, Majdanek and Flossenbürg concentration camps. In 1946 he was arrested for his role in The Holocaust, but hanged himself in prison before he could stand trial.

== Life ==
Max Koegel was born on 16 October 1895 in Füssen, in the Kingdom of Bavaria. He was the fourth son of a carpenter who worked at a local furniture factory. Shortly before his sixth birthday, Koegel's mother died from complications during childbirth. In 1907, his father died and Max was sent to live with a family at a nearby farm. He also had to leave school and began training as a shepherd and later worked as a mountain guide.

When the First World War broke out, Koegel volunteered to join the Bavarian infantry. He served in the military until 12 January 1919 and reached the rank of corporal. He was wounded three times, including once during the Battle of Verdun, and received the Iron Cross second class.

After the war, Koegel returned to Bavaria and worked as a customs clerk in Garmisch-Partenkirchen. In 1920, he left the civil service and opened a souvenir shop. However, four years later he filed for bankruptcy after he was charged with fraud, for which he received a suspended sentence. He went on to travel for work in Switzerland and Austria before returning to Füssen, where he obtained a job in his father's old furniture factory. At that time, he joined the Völkischer Bund and Bund Oberland, both extreme nationalist and anti-Semitic organisations. In 1929, Koegel's eight-year-old son died from measles and a short time later, his marriage of ten years ended in divorce. Koegel became a member of the Nazi Party (#1179781) on 2 May 1932, and of the Schutzstaffel (SS #37644) in June 1932.

== Nazi SS service ==
Koegel became adjutant to the Dachau concentration camp commander in 1937. From 1938 to 1942 he was first "Direktor" (managing director) and then commander of the labour camp for women in Lichtenburg at Ravensbrück with the rank of Sturmbannführer (major). In 1942 he was commander of the extermination camp Majdanek and was involved in the installation of gas chambers at this site. From 1943 to 1945 he was commander at Flossenbürg concentration camp.

== Arrest and suicide ==
After the war, Koegel went on the run and initially managed to evade arrest. However, in June 1946, he was arrested by U.S. occupation forces in Bavaria. He was sent to a prison in Schwabach. Koegel hanged himself the next day, on 27 June 1946.

== See also ==
- List of people who died by suicide by hanging

Military offices
Preceded by SS-Sturmbannführer Alexander Piorkowski	Deputy director of Lichtenburg concentration camp September 1938 – May 1939	Succeeded by None
Preceded by None	Commandant of Ravensbrück concentration camp May 1939 – August 1942	Succeeded by SS-Hauptsturmführer Fritz Suhren
Preceded by SS-Standartenführer Karl-Otto Koch	Commandant of Majdanek concentration camp August 1942 – November 1942	Succeeded by SS-Obersturmführer Hermann Florstedt
Preceded by SS-Sturmbannführer Egon Zill	Commandant of Flossenbürg concentration camp April 1943 – April 1945	Succeeded by None
