= Egon Zill =

Concentration camp commandant (1906–1974)

Egon Gustav Adolf Zill (28 March 1906 in Plauen – 23 October 1974 in Munich) was a German Schutzstaffel (SS) Sturmbannführer and concentration camp commandant.

Zill was born in Plauen. The son of a brewer from Plauen, Zill's father was severely injured in the First World War, and as such Zill was apprenticed to a baker at an early age in order to bring in much needed money to the family. As a 17-year-old, Zill enlisted in both the Nazi Party and the Sturmabteilung (SA), switching to the SS as soon as it came to his hometown (in fact, Zill was the 535 member of the SS nationally). Zill would later work as a security guard in a curtain factory, and it was not until 1934 that he became a full-time SS man, serving as a guard at a minor concentration camp at Chemnitz.

From this low beginning, Zill began to rise through the ranks at the camps. His first appointment at a major camp was at Lichtenburg where he, along with fellow future commandant Arthur Rödl, guarded the camp borders. He moved between camps, seeing service at Dachau, Ravensbrück and Hinzert in various capacities. His first commandant role was at Natzweiler-Struthof before taking charge at Flossenbürg. As a commandant, Zill expected his guards to act with the discipline of soldiers whilst also supporting the idea that camp inmates who had been indoctrinated into Nazism should be allowed to fight for Nazi Germany in return for their freedom. His regime as a commandant was also marked by extreme cruelty, and according to the testimonies of inmates, Zill's crimes included tying prisoners to trees before allowing his dogs to savage their genitalia. Zill was replaced in April 1943 by Max Koegel after being judged ineffective as a commandant. The move followed letters of complaint to Fritz Sauckel from the villagers about the high standards of living enjoyed by camp guards and their wives in contrast to the impoverished standards in the village, as well as a culture of corruption amongst the guards. He was transferred to the Eastern Front in 1943.

Nicknamed "Little Zill" because of his short stature, he went underground after the Second World War, but revealed himself when he put his real name on the birth certificate of an illegitimate child. In 1953, Zill was arrested by West German authorities. In 1955, he was found guilty of two counts of incitement to murder by a Munich court and sentenced to life imprisonment.

However, in 1960, Karl Kapp, the Kapo whom Zill had supposedly incited to murder two prisoners in 1940, was acquitted of murder. He claimed the two inmates had died accidentally and that he had nothing to do with their deaths. In response to the verdict, Zill was granted a new trial. In December 1961, he was found guilty on lesser charges of being an accessory to murder and had his sentence reduced to 15 years. Zill was released from prison in 1963. Despite his acquittal, officials noted that he showed a lack of remorse for his involvement in Dachau in the first place and that he had acted violently towards other prisoners.

Following his release, Zill settled in Dachau. He died in 1974.

== Bibliography ==
- Segev, Tom (1991). Soldiers of evil : the commandants of the Nazi concentration camps. New York: Berkley Books. ISBN 0-425-12171-2.
