= Karl-Otto Koch =

German SS officer (1897–1945)

Karl-Otto Köch
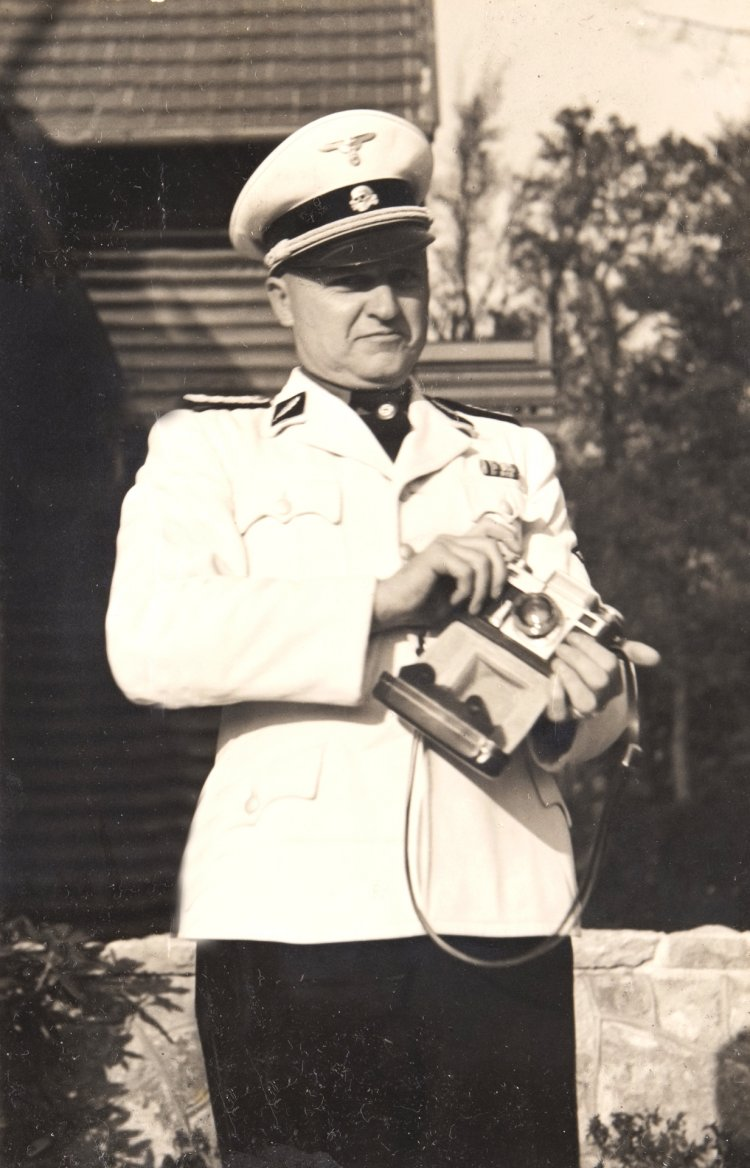
- Koch, c. 1940
- Born: 2 August 1897; Darmstadt, Germany
- Died: 5 April 1945 (aged 47); Buchenwald, Germany
- Spouses: Käte Müller (m. 1924; div. 1931) Ilse Köhler (m. 1937)
- Children: 4
- Status: Executed by firing squad
- Convictions: Murder (3 counts); Embezzlement
- Penalty: Death
- Military career
- Allegiance: German Empire; Nazi Germany
- Branch: Imperial German Army; Schutzstaffel; SS-Totenkopfverbände
- Service years: 1916–1919; 1931–1945
- Rank: Einjährig-Freiwilliger; SS-Standartenführer
- Commands: Esterwegen concentration camp Sachsenhausen concentration camp Buchenwald concentration camp Majdanek concentration camp
- Awards: 1914 Iron cross II class Hindenburg Cross; Civil Defence Decoration; Black wound badge German Sports Badge

Karl-Otto Koch (German: [kʰɔχ]; 2 August 1897 – 5 April 1945) was a German military officer who was a mid-ranking commander in the Schutzstaffel (SS) of Nazi Germany, and the first commandant of the Nazi concentration camps at Buchenwald and Sachsenhausen. From September 1941 until August 1942, he served as the first commandant of the Majdanek concentration camp in German-occupied Poland, stealing vast amounts of valuables and money from murdered Jews. His wife, Ilse Koch, also participated in the crimes at Buchenwald.

== Life ==
Koch was born in Darmstadt, Grand Duchy of Hesse-Darmstadt, on 2 August 1897. His father worked in a local registrar's office and died when Karl was eight years old. After completing elementary school in 1912, Koch attended Mittelschule and completed a commercial apprenticeship.

In 1916, he volunteered to join the Imperial German Army and fought on the Western Front until he was captured by the British. Koch spent the rest of the war as a prisoner of war and returned to Germany in 1919. As a soldier, he behaved well and was awarded the Iron Cross Second Class, the Observer's Badge and the Wound Badge in Black. After World War I, Koch worked as a commercial manager, an authorized signatory and insurance agent and became unemployed in 1932 (he had served a prison sentence in 1930 for embezzlement and forgery). In 1931, he joined the Nazi Party and the Schutzstaffel (SS).

== Service with the SS ==
Koch served with several SS-Standarten (Thirty-fifth SS Regiment Kassel, SS Special Detachment Saxony). In 1934, he took command of the Sachsenburg Concentration Camp. Briefly, he was the officer in charge of the Esterwegen Concentration Camp guard unit, officer in charge of the preventive custody camp in the Lichtenburg Concentration Camp, and the adjutant at Dachau Concentration Camp. On 13 June 1935, he became commander of the Columbia concentration camp in Berlin-Tempelhof and, in April 1936, he was assigned to the concentration camp at Esterwegen. Four months later, he was assigned to the Sachsenhausen concentration camp. By September 1937 he had advanced to SS-Standartenführer (colonel).

On 1 August 1937, he was given command of the new Buchenwald concentration camp. He remained at Buchenwald until September 1941, when he was transferred to the Majdanek concentration camp for POWs near Lublin, Poland. That was due largely to an investigation based on allegations of his improper behavior at Buchenwald, which included corruption, fraud, embezzlement, drunkenness, sexual offences and a murder. Koch commanded the Majdanek camp for only one year; he was relieved from his duties when 86 Soviet POWs escaped from the camp in August 1942. Koch was charged with criminal negligence and transferred to Berlin, where he worked at the SS Personnel Main Office and as a liaison between the SS and the German Post Office.

== Prosecution and death ==
Koch's actions at Buchenwald first caught the attention of SS-Obergruppenführer Josias, Hereditary Prince of Waldeck and Pyrmont, in 1941. While perusing the death list of Buchenwald, Hereditary Prince Josias had seen the name of Walter Krämer, a head hospital orderly at Buchenwald, which he recognized because Krämer had successfully treated him in the past. Hereditary Prince Josias investigated the case and found that Koch, as the Camp Commandant, had ordered Krämer and Karl Peix, a hospital attendant, killed as "political prisoners" because they had treated him for syphilis and he feared it might be discovered. Josias also received reports that a certain prisoner had been shot while attempting to escape, and discovered that in fact, the prisoner had been told to get water from a well some distance from the camp, then was shot from behind; he had also helped treat Koch for syphilis.

By that time, Koch had been transferred to the Majdanek concentration camp in Poland, but his wife, Ilse, was still living at the Commandant's house in Buchenwald. Josias ordered a full-scale investigation of the camp by Georg Konrad Morgen, an SS officer who was an SS-judge in the SS Court Main Office. As a result of the investigation, more of Koch's orders to kill prisoners at the camp were revealed, as well as embezzlement of property stolen from prisoners. The Kochs had used the massive Nazi apparatus to gain an enormous amount of wealth. The Kochs were both arrested in August 1943 to await trial by an SS court.

SS Judge Konrad Morgen formally indicted the Kochs on 17 August 1944, charging Karl Koch with the embezzlement and concealing of funds and goods in an amount of at least 200,000 reichsmarks, and the premeditated murder of three inmates—ostensibly to prevent them from giving evidence to the SS investigatory commission. Ilse was charged with the habitual receiving of stolen goods, and taking for her benefit at least 25,000 reichsmarks. The trial resulted in Koch being sentenced to death for disgracing both himself and the SS. Koch was executed by firing squad on 5 April 1945 one week before American allied troops arrived to liberate the camp. Contrary to some claims, however, Karl's body was not burned in the camp's crematoria, as they had run short of coal and had stopped operating in mid-March 1945. Instead, his body was disposed of in an unknown location.

== Family ==
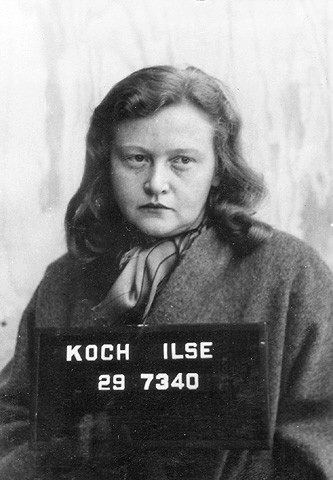
Ilse Koch after her arrest

Koch first married Käte Müller in 1924 and had one psychiatrically troubled son named Manfred; however, this marriage ended with divorce in 1931 due to his infidelity. On 25 May 1937, Koch married Ilse Koch (née Margarete Ilse Köhler), with whom he had a son and two daughters. Ilse became known later as "The Witch of Buchenwald" (Die Hexe von Buchenwald), usually rendered in English as "The Bitch of Buchenwald." Though Ilse Koch never had any official job at Buchenwald or at any other concentration camp, many inmates alleged that she used the tacit authority she had as the commandant's wife to abuse prisoners, or seek their punishment by the camp SS.

== Photo album of Sachsenhausen concentration camp ==
More than 55 years after Koch's execution, a private photo album of his was discovered in the FSB archives in Moscow. Koch received the album from his co-workers as a gift for his 40th birthday. The album documents the construction process of the Sachsenhausen concentration camp. It consists of 460 photographs, including 200 neatly labeled photos — some with cynical remarks — of the creation of the camp in 1936 and 1937. The photos also depict the concentration camp personnel, and prisoners as they arrive in normal clothing and later appear for roll call with their heads shaved and dressed in prisoner uniforms.

== See also ==
- Buchenwald Resistance
- Phil Lamason, Allied airman taken to Buchenwald

== Bibliography ==
- Benoît Cazenave, L’exemplarité du commandant SS Karl Otto Koch, Revue de la Fondation Auschwitz, Bruxelles, 2005.

Military offices
Preceded by SS-Oberführer Alexander Reiner	Commandant of Columbia-Haus concentration camp 13 June 1935 – 1 April 1936	Succeeded by SS-Oberführer Heinrich Deubel
Preceded by SS-Oberführer Hans Loritz	Commandant of Esterwegen concentration camp 20 April 1936 – August 1936	Succeeded by absorbed into Sachsenhausen concentration camp
Preceded by SS-Obersturmbannführer Michael Lippert	Commandant of Sachsenhausen concentration camp October 1936 – 1 August 1937	Succeeded by SS-Oberführer Hans Helwig
Preceded by none	Commandant of Buchenwald concentration camp 1 August 1937 – September 1941	Succeeded by SS-Standartenführer Hermann Pister
Preceded by none	Commandant of Majdanek concentration camp September 1941 – 24 August 1942	Succeeded by SS-Sturmbannführer Max Koegel
