= Hans Loritz =

German SS officer and war criminal (1895–1946)

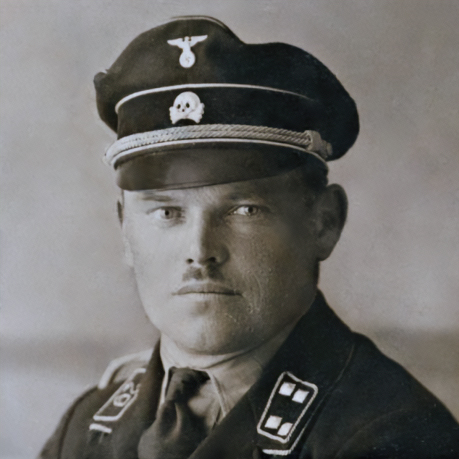
- Portrait of Loritz
- Born: 12 December 1895; Augsburg, German Empire
- Died: 31 January 1946 (aged 50); Neumünster, Allied-occupied Germany
- Cause of death: Suicide
- SS service
- Allegiance: Nazi Germany
- Branch: Schutzstaffel
- Rank: SS-Oberführer
- Commands: Dachau concentration camp

Hans Loritz (12 December 1895 – 31 January 1946) was an officer in the Schutzstaffel (SS) who was the commandant of several concentration camps in Germany and Nazi-occupied Europe. He died by suicide in captivity after the war.

== Early life ==
After completing primary school, Loritz started an apprenticeship as a baker. In 1914, he volunteered to join the Bavarian 3rd Infantry Regiment. During World War I he was wounded several times and was promoted to be a non-commissioned officer. In 1917 he volunteered for the German Air Corps and was accepted as a gunner. He was shot down over France, where he was held as a Prisoner of War until 1920.

On his return to Augsburg, he joined local police (where his father worked) transferring subsequently to the motorcycle squad. His first marriage in 1922 produced a son. In 1927, following several disciplinary issues, he was dismissed and became a debt collector for the gas company. His marriage was dissolved in 1935 and he married for second time in 1936 but in the same year fathered a child with another woman.

== Commander in concentration camps ==
Loritz joined the Nazi Party in August 1930 (membership number 298668) and joined the SS one month later (membership number 4165). Following several personal clashes with the SA in Augsburg, the SS assigned Loritz to the Dachau concentration camp in the Summer 1933, where he was to oversee junior SS volunteers from Austria. He quickly began to admire and idolize the new camp commandant, Theodor Eicke. In July 1934, he was given command of KZ Esterwegen in the North of Germany. He made camp rules stricter, interrogated prisoners and ordered torture. In 1935, he was promoted to SS-Oberführer. After the close of Esterwegen, Loritz returned to Dachau as camp commandant in April 1936. Loritz was known as one of the most brutal camp commanders at Dachau, personally cruel, he allowed barbaric behavior by the guards.

His self-enrichment and corruption brought scrutiny from the SS-Verwaltungsamt. He took prisoners to work at his private villa in St. Gilgen at the Wolfgangsee. In July 1939, Loritz was sent against his will to Graz. He immediately tried to return to concentration camp service. In December 1939, Loritz was transferred to KZ Sachsenhausen. He became the camp commandant in place of Walter Eisfeld in March 1940 on the orders of Reichsführer-SS Heinrich Himmler. He selected prisoners unable to work, who were killed in June 1941 in Sonnenstein Euthanasia Centre. In the same year, he organized the shooting of at least 10,000 Soviet prisoners of war.

Loritz became a section leader of the Allgemeine SS (General SS) in Klagenfurt. He remained until 1942, when he was removed at the suggestion of Oswald Pohl, leader of the SS Main Economic and Administrative Office (SS-WVHA). He was then sent to oversee camps in Beisfjord, Elsfjord, Rognan, and Karasjok in northern Norway where Yugoslavian prisoners were used as forced labour to construct roads and military installations.

== Arrest and suicide ==
After the war, he was arrested and imprisoned at the internment camp in Neumünster to await trial by the Soviets. Loritz committed suicide in January, 1946.

== Ranks and promotions ==
Loritz's SS-Ranks
Date	Rank
15 November 1931	SS-Untersturmführer
11 April 1932	SS-Hauptsturmführer
23 August 1932	SS-Sturmbannführer
15 July 1933	SS-Obersturmbannführer
22 March 1934	SS-Standartenführer
15 September 1935	SS-Oberführer

== Bibliography ==
- Dirk Riedel: Ordnungshüter und Massenmörder im Dienst der "Volksgemeinschaft": Der KZ-Kommandant Hans Loritz. Metropol Verlag, Berlin 2010, ISBN 978-3-940938-63-3.
- Rudolf Hoess, Constantine Fitzgibbon, Primo Levi. Commandant of Auschwitz: The Autobiography of Rudolf Hoess. Sterling Publishing Company, Inc., 2000. ISBN 978-1-84212-024-8
- Yerger, M.C. (1997). Allgemeine-SS: The Commands, Units, and Leaders of the General SS. Schiffer military history. Schiffer Pub. ISBN 978-0-7643-0145-2.
