= August Frank =

German SS functionary and convict at the Nuremberg trials

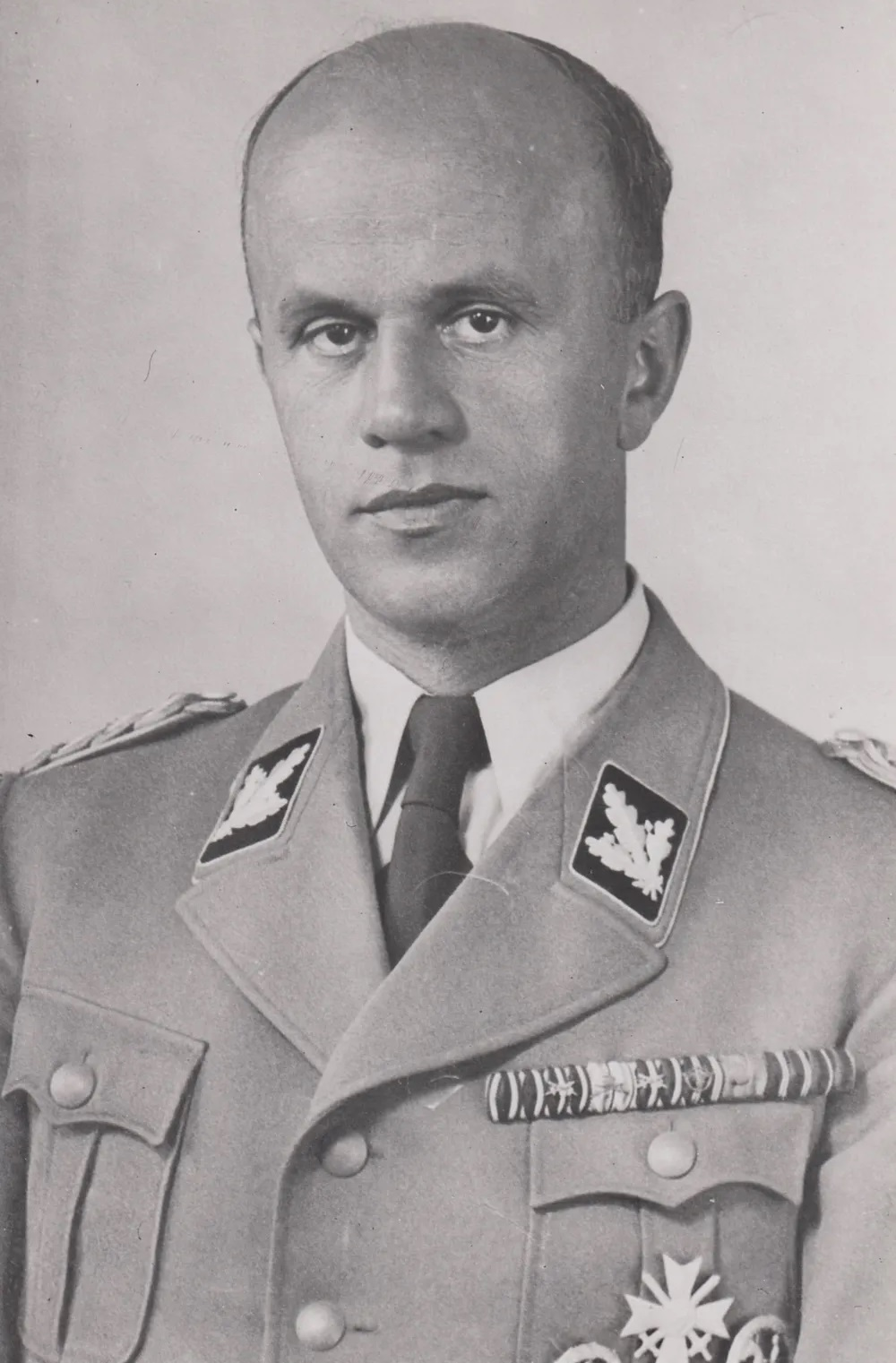
- Born: 5 April 1898; Augsburg, German Empire
- Died: 21 March 1984 (aged 85); Karlsruhe, West Germany
- Occupation: Nazi concentration camp official
- Status: Deceased
- Convictions: War crimes Crimes against humanity Membership in a criminal organization
- Trial: Pohl trial
- Penalty: Life imprisonment; commuted to 15 years imprisonment

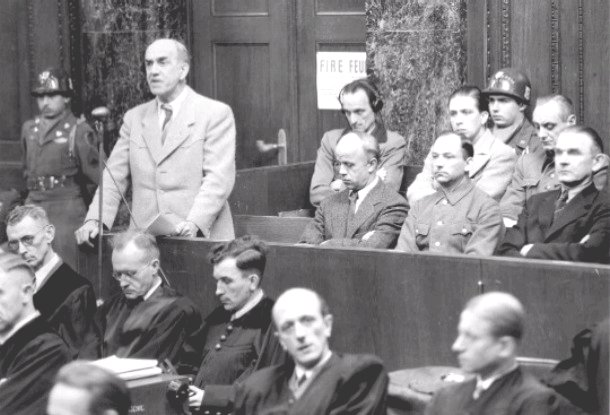
Oswald Pohl speaking at the WVHA trial. August Frank is seated immediately to the right of Pohl in the defendants' box

August Franz Frank (5 April 1898 – 21 March 1984) was a German SS functionary in the SS Main Economic and Administrative Office, generally known by its German initials WVHA. The WVHA was, among other things, responsible for the administration of the Nazi concentration camps. After the war, the higher WVHA officials, including Frank, were tried and convicted of crimes against humanity.

== Early Nazi career ==
Frank joined the SS as a private on 1 May 1932, and the Nazi Party on 1 January 1933. From 1933 to 1935, Frank worked at minor administrative duties in connection with a number of small industries at the Dachau concentration camp manned by inmate labor, most of which were concerned with concentration camp maintenance.

== Rise in Nazi hierarchy ==
In 1935, at the request of Oswald Pohl, Frank became SS Administrative Officer of the Special Purpose Troops (SS-Verfügungstruppe) and of the concentration camp guards, the SS Death's Head units (SS-Totenkopfverbände), although the presence of a bureaucratic rival somewhat limited his authority in the second capacity. In February 1940, Frank became chief supply officer of the Waffen-SS and Death's Head units under Pohl.

== Concentration camp administrator ==
When the WVHA was organized in 1942, he became Pohl's deputy chief of WVHA and chief of Department (Amtsgruppe) A, the administrative division of WVHA. He served in this capacity until 1 September 1943, when he was permitted to resign to become administrative chief of the Order Police. Amtsgruppe A was the administrative branch of WVHA. It comprised five offices (Ämter), as follows:

- Amt A-1: budgets.
- Amt A-2: finance and payroll.
- Amt A-3: legal matters.
- Amt A-4: auditing office.
- Amt A-5: personnel.

== Involvement in the Holocaust ==
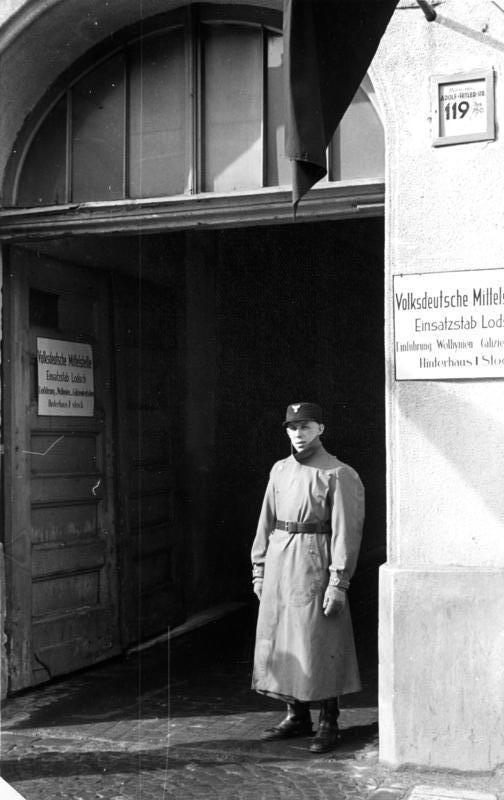
The SS Ethnic Germans Welfare Office (Volksdeutsche Mittelstelle), in Lodz, Poland, then occupied by Germany. On 26 September 1942 August Frank, an official of the SS concentration camp administration department, directed that all property of the Jews murdered in Operation Reinhard be diverted to this office.

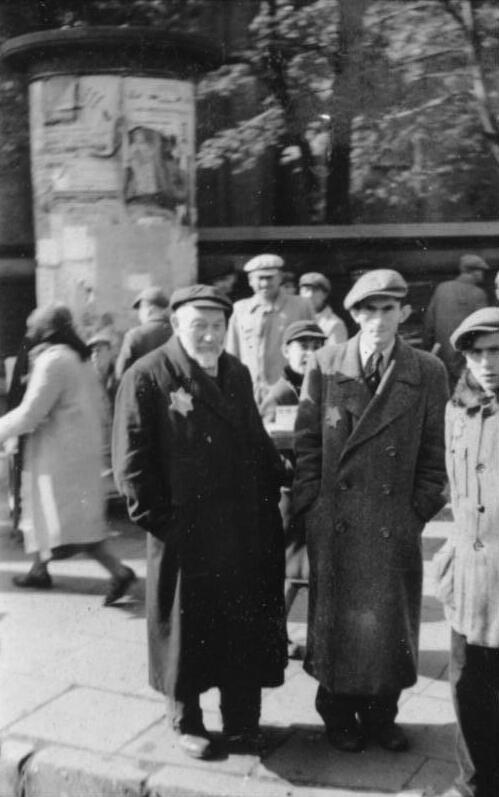
Jews in the Łódź Ghetto in 1940. The yellow star can be clearly seen sewn on their clothing. By order of August Frank, once these people were murdered, their clothing would be salvaged and restributed to "ethnic" Germans Volksdeutsche, but only after care was taken to be sure the yellow star was removed.

A measure of the detailed planning that Frank and other Nazis put into the carrying out of the Holocaust and the deprivation of the property of the murdered Jews can be gauged from a memorandum prepared by Frank on 26 September 1942. For example, Frank gave instructions on dealing with the underwear of the murder victims. This memorandum, when it came to light after the war, played a key role in refuting Frank's claims that he had no knowledge that Jews were being murdered en masse in the extermination camps of Operation Reinhard. The memorandum is also notable as an example of the use of the Nazi euphemism "evacuation" of the Jews, which meant their systematic murder.

== Crimes against humanity ==
After World War II, Frank was placed on trial on accusations that during his work at WVHA he had committed crimes against humanity. The court concerned itself with Frank's conduct between 1 September 1939, and 1 September 1943. Frank's defense was that he thought the only people in concentration camps were solely composed of German nationals who were either habitual criminals or genuine threats to the Nazi regime. This argument was rejected by the court, which found that Frank knew of and actively participated in the Nazi slave labor program.

It cannot be imagined that he believed that all the inmates of the 20 concentration camps and the 165 labor camps scattered throughout the entire continent of Europe were German nationals, composed of habitual criminals, anti-Nazi and asocial persons, and others whom the Reich for security purposes thought best to imprison.

The court held that the following evidence, among other things, showed Frank's knowledge of the international slave labor program that the Nazi concentration camps had become:

- A letter from Oswald Pohl, dated 26 June 1942, to all Amtsgruppen chiefs (which would have included Frank), stating that the head of every branch office which was provided with prisoners or prisoners of war for work was responsible for the prevention of escape, robbery, and sabotage;
- A letter signed by Oswald Pohl, but actually dictated by Frank, to Heinrich Himmler, which discussed the commanders of many of the concentration camps and their qualifications and recommendations for reassignments, detachments, and promotions.
- Frank's memorandum of 26 September 1942 to SS administrators at Lublin and Auschwitz directing that the Jewish Star be removed from the garments of deceased inmates.

Frank appears to have planned to personally profit from concentration camp labor. He was an incorporating partner with Georg Lörner, another WVHA official, in a leather and textile enterprise at Dachau. Based on this and other evidence, the court rejected Frank's testimony as incredible:

it must be concluded, therefore, that Frank knew that the slave labor was being supplied by the concentration camps on a tremendous scale. It must also be conclusively presumed that Frank knew that slavery constituted a crime against humanity.

== Involvement in genocide ==
Frank's lawyer claimed Frank "did not work for the political aims of National Socialism." This position was rejected by the court:

It is futile to claim that the program of extermination of the Jews, or the ravaging of the Eastern countries, or the program of enforced slave labor, or the devastation of conquered territory, stemmed from National Socialist policy but not from the Reich. The SS, in which Frank attained the high rank of Obergruppenfuehrer, was a National Socialist agency, and anyone who worked, as Frank did, for 8 years in the higher councils of that agency cannot successfully claim that he was separated from its political activities and purposes.

In particular, Frank at his trial claimed he only became aware of the Jewish extermination program after hearing Himmler's Posen speech on 4 October 1943, a month after he had left the WVHA. By this time, the Nazis had nearly completed the mass killings of the Jews of Poland and nearby areas of Eastern Europe in what has become known as Action Reinhard, also known as Operation Reinhard and the Reinhard action. Frank handled the huge amount of personal property that was either robbed from the Jews while they were alive or stolen from their bodies (there were 2,000 car loads of textiles, for instance). In his 26 September 1942 memorandum, Frank had chosen to designate this property as "Jewish concealed and stolen goods." The court rejected Frank's claim that he couldn't have known of the source of these goods:

But even if we were to give Frank's contention full faith and credit (which we do not), we come to the inescapable conclusion that if he was not a confederate in murder he certainly was in larceny. By what process of law or reason did the Reich become entitled to one hundred million Reichsmarks' worth of personal property owned by persons whom they had enslaved and who died, even from natural causes, in their servitude? Robbing the dead, even without the added offense of killing, is and always has been a crime. And when it is organized, planned, and carried out on a hundred-million-mark scale, it becomes an aggravated crime, and anyone who takes part in it is a criminal.

Frank claimed that he didn't know and had no reason to know that the people from whom the property had come from had been murdered en masse; he testified that he thought all the property accumulating from Operation Reinhard had come from Jews who had died naturally in concentration camps. The court rejected this contention, relying again on the categories of property Frank had dealt with in his 26 September 1942 memorandum :

It is difficult to imagine a convoy of Jews from the East, packed so tightly into freight cars that many died, carrying with them for their comfort and convenience such items as electric razors, feather beds, umbrellas, thermos jugs, and baby carriages. It is equally incredible that they would be able to keep such articles in the concentration camps until they died of natural causes. It is fair to assume that the prisoners who froze to death or who died from exhaustion and exposure were not equipped with feather beds, quilts, and woolen blankets. Nor can it be believed that before being herded off to Auschwitz or Lublin they were given an opportunity to gather up their collections of old coins and stamps with which to amuse themselves during their idle time.

== Acquitted of mass murder ==
Although the court had ruled that Frank was criminally answerable for the slave labor program and the looting of Jewish property, he escaped criminal liability for the murders themselves, as the court viewed him as generally being only involved after the people had already been murdered.

== Member of criminal organization (Nazi SS) ==
Frank was found guilty also of being a member of a criminal organization, that is, the Nazi SS. Frank's highest rank in the SS was Lieutenant General (Obergruppenführer).

== Sentence and commutation ==
On 3 November 1947 Frank was sentenced to life in prison by the tribunal with the following words:

AUGUST FRANK, this Tribunal has adjudged you guilty under counts two, three, and four of the indictment filed in this case. For the crimes of which you have thus been convicted, this Tribunal sentences you to imprisonment for the remainder of your natural life, at such place of confinement as shall be determined by competent authority.

In 1951 Frank's sentence was commuted to 15 years. He was released from prison on 6 May 1954, and died in March 1984.

== See also ==
- August Frank memorandum
- Deutsche Wirtschaftsbetriebe
- List SS-Obergruppenführer
