= Pohl trial =

1947 subsequent Nuremberg trial

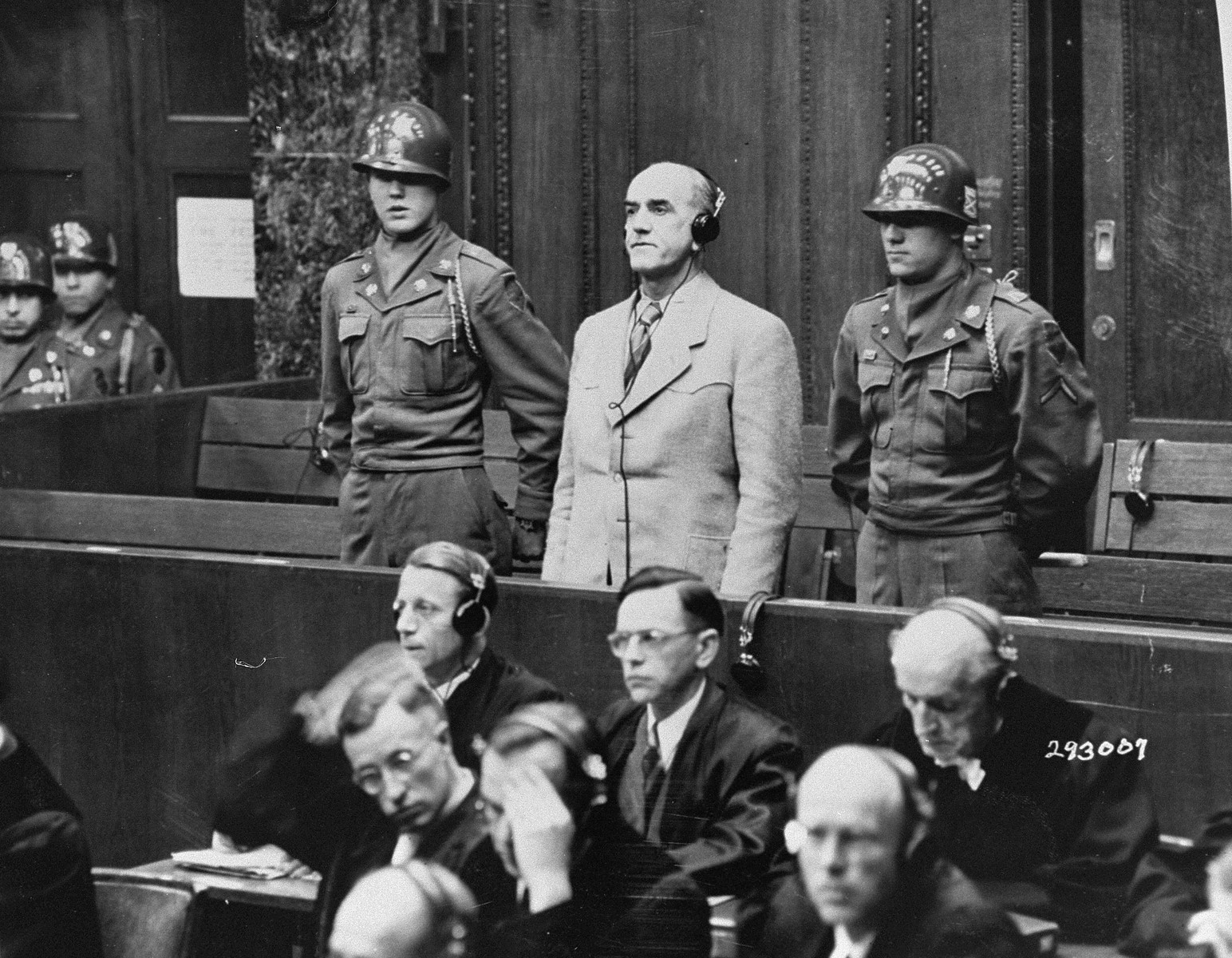
- SS-Obergruppenführer Oswald Pohl receives his sentence of death by hanging
- Court: Nuremberg
- Full case name: The United States of America vs. Oswald Pohl, et al
- Indictment: January 13, 1947
- Decided: August 11, 1948

Court membership
- Judges sitting: Robert M. Toms (presiding); Fitzroy Donald Phillips; Michael A. Musmanno; John J. Speight (alternate)

The United States of America vs. Oswald Pohl, et al., commonly known as the Pohl trial, was the fourth of the twelve "subsequent Nuremberg trials" for war crimes and crimes against humanity after the end of World War II between 1947 and 1948. The accused were SS-Obergruppenführer Oswald Pohl and 17 other SS officers employed by the SS Main Economic and Administrative Office charged for their administration of, and active involvement in, the Nazi concentration camp system.

The Pohl trial was held by United States authorities at the Palace of Justice in Nuremberg in the American occupation zone before US military courts, not before the International Military Tribunal. Four of the accused, including Pohl, were sentenced to death by hanging, three to life imprisonment, eight to prison sentences from 10 to 25 years, and three were acquitted.

The judges in this case, heard before Military Tribunal II, were Robert M. Toms (presiding judge), Fitzroy Donald Phillips, Michael A. Musmanno, and John J. Speight as an alternate judge. The chief of counsel for the prosecution was Telford Taylor; James M. McHaney and Jack W. Robbins were the principal prosecutors. The indictment was presented on January 13, 1947; the trial began on April 8, and sentences were handed down on November 3, 1947. At the request of the judges, the court reconvened on July 14, 1948, to consider additional material presented by the defense. On August 11, 1948, the tribunal issued its final sentences, confirming most of its earlier sentences, but slightly reducing some of the prison sentences and changing the death sentence of Georg Lörner into a sentence of life imprisonment.

== Case ==
SS-Obergruppenführer Oswald Pohl was chief of the SS Main Economic and Administrative Office (WVHA), the organization responsible for managing the finances, supply systems and business projects of the Allgemeine-SS, and procurement for the Waffen-SS. The WHVA was responsible for administration of the Nazi concentration camps, the Concentration Camps Inspectorate, and the SS-Totenkopfverbände in the implementation of the Final Solution. Pohl, as chief of the WHVA, was technically the top administrator of the Nazi system of concentration camps and extermination camps. Seventeen WHVA officials were also charged for their involvement in the concentration camp system, including three of Pohl's deputy chiefs.

== Indictment ==
The indictment presented by a grand jury charged the defendants with the following.

1. Participating in a common plan or conspiracy to commit war crimes and crimes against humanity.
2. War crimes through the administration of concentration camps and extermination camps, and the mass murders and atrocities committed there.
3. Crimes against humanity on the same grounds, including slave labor charges.
4. Membership in a criminal organization, the SS. Note: The SS had been found a criminal organization previously by the IMT.

All defendants were charged on all counts of the indictment, except Hohberg, who was not charged on count 4. Charge 1 (conspiracy) was largely disregarded by the tribunal and no judgments on this count were passed.

== Defendants ==
All convicts were found guilty on charges 2, 3, and 4, except Hohberg (who was not charged on count 4, but found guilty on counts 2 and 3). Three defendants were acquitted on all charges: Vogt, Scheide, and Klein.

Defendant	Function	Sentence of Nov 3, 1947	Sentence of Aug 11, 1948	Outcome of 1951 Amnesty
Oswald Pohl	Head of the WVHA, General of the Waffen-SS	Death by hanging	Confirmed	Executed on June 7, 1951
August Frank	Deputy chief of the WVHA, Lt. General of the Waffen-SS	Life imprisonment	Confirmed	Commuted to 15 years; released in May 1954; died in 1984
Georg Lörner	Deputy chief of the WVHA, Lt. General of the Waffen-SS	Death by hanging	Reduced to life imprisonment	Commuted to 15 years; released in March 1954; died in 1959
Heinz Karl Fanslau	Deputy chief of the WVHA, Brigadier Maj. general of the Waffen-SS	25 years	Reduced to 20 years	Commuted to 15 years; released in March 1954; died in 1987
Hans Lörner	SS-Oberführer	10 years	Confirmed	Released; died in 1983
Josef Vogt	SS-Standartenführer	Acquitted		Died in 1967
Erwin Tschentscher	SS-Standartenführer	10 years	Confirmed	Released; died in 1972
Rudolf Scheide	SS-Standartenführer	Acquitted		Died in 1981
Max Kiefer	SS-Obersturmbannführer	Life imprisonment	Reduced to 20 years	Released; died in 1974
Franz Eirenschmalz	SS-Standartenführer	Death by hanging	Confirmed	Commuted to 9 years; released in May 1951; died in 1995
Karl Sommer	SS-Sturmbannführer	Death by hanging	Confirmed	Commuted to life imprisonment in 1949; commuted to 20 years in 1951; released in December 1953
Hermann Pook	SS-Obersturmbannführer of the Waffen-SS, chief dentist of the WVHA	10 years	Confirmed	Released; died in 1983
Hans Baier	SS-Oberführer	10 years	Confirmed	Released; died in 1969
Hans Hohberg	Executive officer	10 years	Confirmed	Released; died in 1968
Leo Volk	SS-Hauptsturmführer, personal advisor of Pohl, head of legal department of the WVHA	10 years	Confirmed	Commuted to 8 years; released in February 1951; died in 1973
Karl Mummenthey	SS-Obersturmbannführer	Life imprisonment	Confirmed	Commuted to 20 years; released in December 1953; died in 1968
Hanns Bobermin	SS-Obersturmbannführer	20 years	Reduced to 15 years	Released; died in 1960
Horst Klein	SS-Obersturmbannführer	Acquitted		Died in 1977

Hohberg's sentence of 10 years included time already served—he was imprisoned on October 22, 1945—because he was not a member of the SS. The defense counsel for Karl Sommer filed a petition to modify the sentence to General Lucius D. Clay, the Commander-in-Chief for the American occupation zone in Germany. In response to this appeal, Clay ordered Sommer's death sentence to be commuted into a lifetime imprisonment on May 11, 1949. Pohl kept proclaiming his innocence, saying he had been only a lower functionary. He was hanged on June 7, 1951, at Landsberg Prison.

Richard Glücks, the head of Amt D: Konzentrationslagerwesen (the WVHA department for concentration camps), had been the direct superior of all commanding officers at concentration camps and, as such directly responsible for all the atrocities committed there, was not tried. On May 10, 1945, two days after the unconditional surrender of Germany, Glücks had committed suicide in the navy hospital of Flensburg.

== See also ==
- August Frank memorandum
- Deutsche Wirtschaftsbetriebe
- DEST
- Nuremberg trials
