= Deutsche Wirtschaftsbetriebe =

Project launched by Nazi Germany

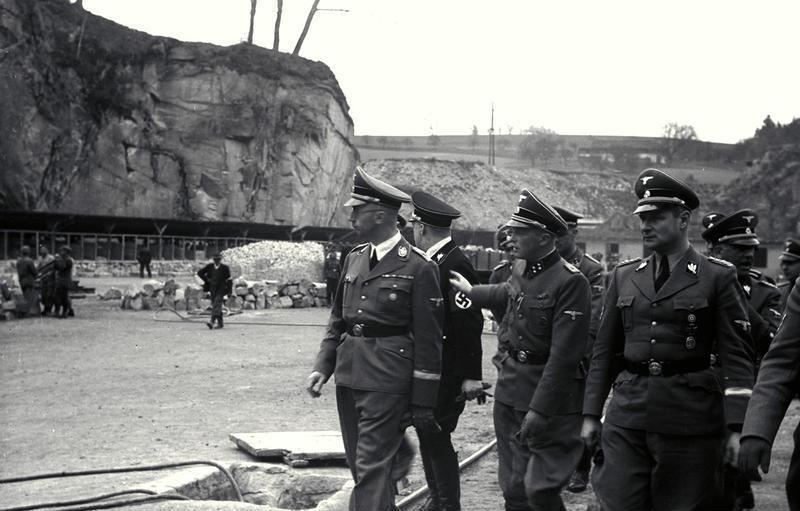
- Himmler inspecting stone quarries mined by prisoners of Mauthausen-Gusen concentration camp
- Location: German-occupied Europe, forced labour
- Period: World War II (1939–1945)

Deutsche Wirtschaftsbetriebe (German: for 'German Economic Enterprises'), abbreviated DWB, was a project launched by Nazi Germany in World War II. Organised and managed by the Allgemeine SS, its aim was to profit from the use of slave labour extracted from the Nazi concentration camp inmates.

== Holding company for SS industries ==
In July 1940, Oswald Pohl (acting on the advice of Walter Salpeter and Hans Hohberg) set up DWB as a holding company for the majority of SS-owned enterprises in order to offset the profits of other SS companies with the losses of German Earth and Stone Works's unsuccessful brickworks at Oranienburg I (Sachsenhausen concentration camp), reducing the taxes due.

DWB was a holding company for more than 25 SS industries. Oswald Pohl, the head of the SS Main Economic and Administrative Office (known by its German initials as WVHA) was also the chief officer of DWB. Georg Lörner, another high WVHA official, was another incorporator. Through stock ownership DWB controlled a wide variety of enterprises, such as stone quarries, brick manufacturing plants, cement mills, pharmaceutical factories, real estate, housing, building materials, book printing and binding, porcelain and ceramics, mineral water and fruit juices, furniture, foodstuffs, and textiles and leather. Some of these businesses and properties had previously been seized or otherwise expropriated from their rightful owners.

The following companies were part of the holding (sorted in groups):

Group Construction materials, Ceramics und Porzellan

- Deutsche Erd- und Steinwerke GmbH (DEST)
- Ostindustrie GmbH (OSTI)
- Pragobau AG
- Golleschauer Portland-Zementfabrik AG
- Ostdeutsche Baustoffwerke GmbH
- Zettlitzer Kaolinwerke AG
- Schlackenwerk Linz GmbH
- Porzellanmanufaktur Allach
- Porzellanfabrik Victoria GmbH
- Tonwerke Großes Werder GmbH
- Essin GmbH
- Porag Porzellan-Radiatorenwerk GmbH
- Bohemia Keramische Werke AG
- Deutsche Torfverwertung GmbH
- Klinker-Zement GmbH

Group Food and Beverages

- Deutsche Lebensmittel GmbH
- Selchwaren- und Konservenfabrik AG
- Salami- und Nahrungsmittelfabrik AG
- Freudentaler Getränke GmbH
- F. Kunerle oHG
- Deutsche Versuchsanstalt für Ernährung und Verpflegung GmbH
- Societä Anonima Prodotti Agricoli Vitaminici Apuania
- Lesnoplod Orava Sojka a Spol
- Mattoni (Mineralwasser)
- Apollinaris (Mineralwasser)
- Sudetenquell GmbH

Group Paper, Printing and Publishing

- Papierfabrik Neudeck AG
- SS-Druckschriftenversand GmbH
- Forschungsanstalt für das Deutsche Buchwesen GmbH
- Lumbeck-Gesellschaft für das deutsche Buchwesen mbH
- SS-Vordruck-Verlag GmbH
- Völkischer Kunstverlag GmbH
- Großdeutscher Bilderdienst GmbH
- Friedrich Franz Bauer GmbH
- Deutsche Briefkasten-Reklame GmbH
- Nordland-Verlag

Group Settlement and Infrastructure

- Gesellschaft für technisch-wirtschaftliche Entwicklung mbH (Getewent)
- Siedler Wirtschaftsgemeinschaft Zamosc GmbH
- Allod Eigenheim- und Kleinsiedlungs GmbH
- Erste Gemeinnützige Baugesellschaft für Kleinwohnungen GmbH
- Haus- und Grundbesitz GmbH
- Gemeinnützige Wohnungs- und Heimstättengesellschaft mbH

Group Textil and Glas

- Gesellschaft für Textil- und Lederverwertung mbH (Texled)
- Rheinahr-Glasfabrik GmbH

Group Furniture and Interior

- Deutsches Sperrholz- und Fournierwerk GmbH
- Verkaufsstelle Berliner Möbelwerkstätten eGmbH
- Deutsche Ausrüstungswerke GmbH (DAW)
- Deutsche Meisterwerkstätten GmbH
- Deutsche Heimgestaltung GmbH
- Deutsche Edelmöbel GmbH

Groupe other Enterprises

- Gesellschaft für Seuchenbekämpfung mbH
- Asid GmbH
- Deutsche Heilmittel GmbH
- Anton Loibl GmbH
- Deutsche Schieferöl GmbH (Unternehmen Wüste)

== Role in war crimes ==
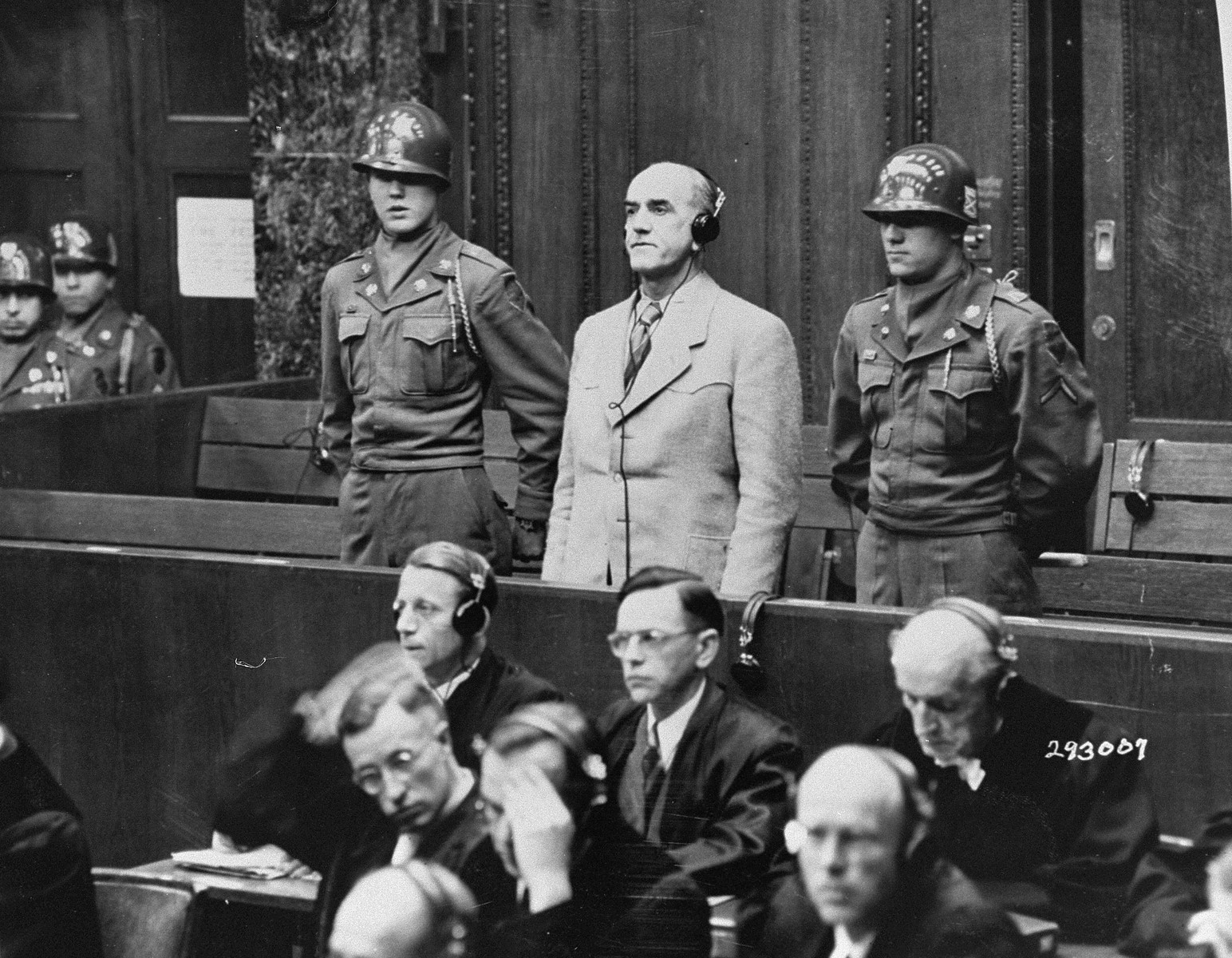
Oswald Pohl receives a death sentence from the Nuremberg trial.

After World War II, the surviving chief officers of WVHA were on trial for crimes against humanity in what became known as Pohl trial. Most of them were found guilty. Both Pohl and Georg Lörner were sentenced to death by hanging, although Lörner managed to get his sentence commuted to a prison term. The war crimes tribunal placed particular emphasis on the role the defendants had played in four DWB subsidiaries:

- German Earth and Stone Works, known as DEST, which operated five granite quarries, six brick and tile plants, and a stone-cutting plant;
- The Klinker-Zement, manufacturing brick and cinder block, fireproof products, ceramics, lime, and chalk. This company had large subsidiaries at Golleschau, Prague, Lvov, and Białystok;
- Ostindustrie, or OSTI, organized in March 1943 and dissolved a year later, which, using forced Jewish labor operated all confiscated Jewish industries in German-occupied Poland, including foundries, textile plants, quarries, glass works, and others.
- The German Equipment Works or DAW, which operated various industries in seven concentration camps.

DEST in particular became notorious for exploitation under brutal conditions of the labor of concentration camp inmates at Mauthausen-Gusen concentration camp in Austria.

== Notes ==
=== Works cited ===
- Jaskot, Paul B. (2002). The Architecture of Oppression: The SS, Forced Labor and the Nazi Monumental Building Economy. Routledge. ISBN 978-1-134-59461-0.
