= Albert Sauer =

SS officer (1898–1945)

Albert Sauer (17 August 1898, Misdroy – 3 May 1945, Falkensee) was a Nazi German commandant of Mauthausen-Gusen concentration camp.

== Nazi atrocities and death ==
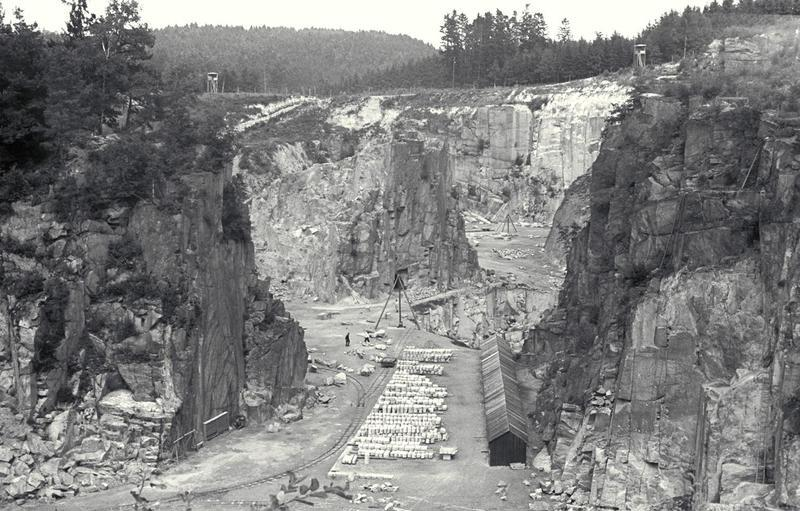
Quarry Wiener Graben (1941/42)

Sauer, a carpenter by trade, became a member of the NSDAP (Nazi Party) and the SS in 1931. After a period of unemployment, he became a full-time SS employee.

A protégé of the Inspector of Concentration Camps Theodor Eicke, Sauer was assigned to the SS guard unit (Wachtruppe) of Oranienburg concentration camp in April 1935. From 1 April 1936, he was the commandant of Bad Sulza concentration camp. Between 1 August 1937 and mid-1938, Sauer was second Schutzhaftlagerführer in Sachsenhausen concentration camp and thus belonged to Wachtruppe Brandenburg.

In the period between 1 August 1938 and 1 April 1939, he officially acted as commandant of the then-temporary quarry Wienergraben, so named because of the Wienergraben Valley in which it was located, of Granitwerke Mauthausen, which relied on slave labor from the subcamps of Mauthausen-Gusen. Due to negligence, Sauer was removed from the camp service in April 1939.

On 9 February 1939, he was replaced as camp commandant by SS-Sturmbannführer Franz Ziereis. In the period of 1941–1942, he had an official position in the RKFDV (Reichskommissar für die Festigung deutschen Volkstums; Reich Commissioner for the Consolidation of German Nationhood).

From September 1942 to April 1943, Sauer was again Schutzhaftlagerführer in Sachsenhausen. In 1943, Sauer was involved in the destruction of the Riga Ghetto, which involved executing or deporting thousands of people (mostly Jews) to their deaths in concentration camps. Later, he was temporarily the commandant of Kaiserwald concentration camp which was vacated in July 1944, by execution and deportation of inmates.

He died of wounds received at Falkensee on 3 May 1945.

== Bibliography ==
- Eberhard Jäckel et al.: Enzyklopädie des Holocaust, Vol. 2, Tel Aviv
- Stefan Hördler: Die Schlussphase des Konzentrationslagers Ravensbrück, in: Zeitschrift für Geschichtswissenschaft, Book 3, 2008, p. 229, Fn 34
- Wolfgang Benz, Barbara Distel (ed.): Der Ort des Terrors: Geschichte der nationalsozialistischen Konzentrationslager, Flossenbürg, Mauthausen, Ravensbrück, Vol. 4, Munich 2006, ISBN 978-3406-52964-1
