= German Earth and Stone Works =

German SS company during WWII

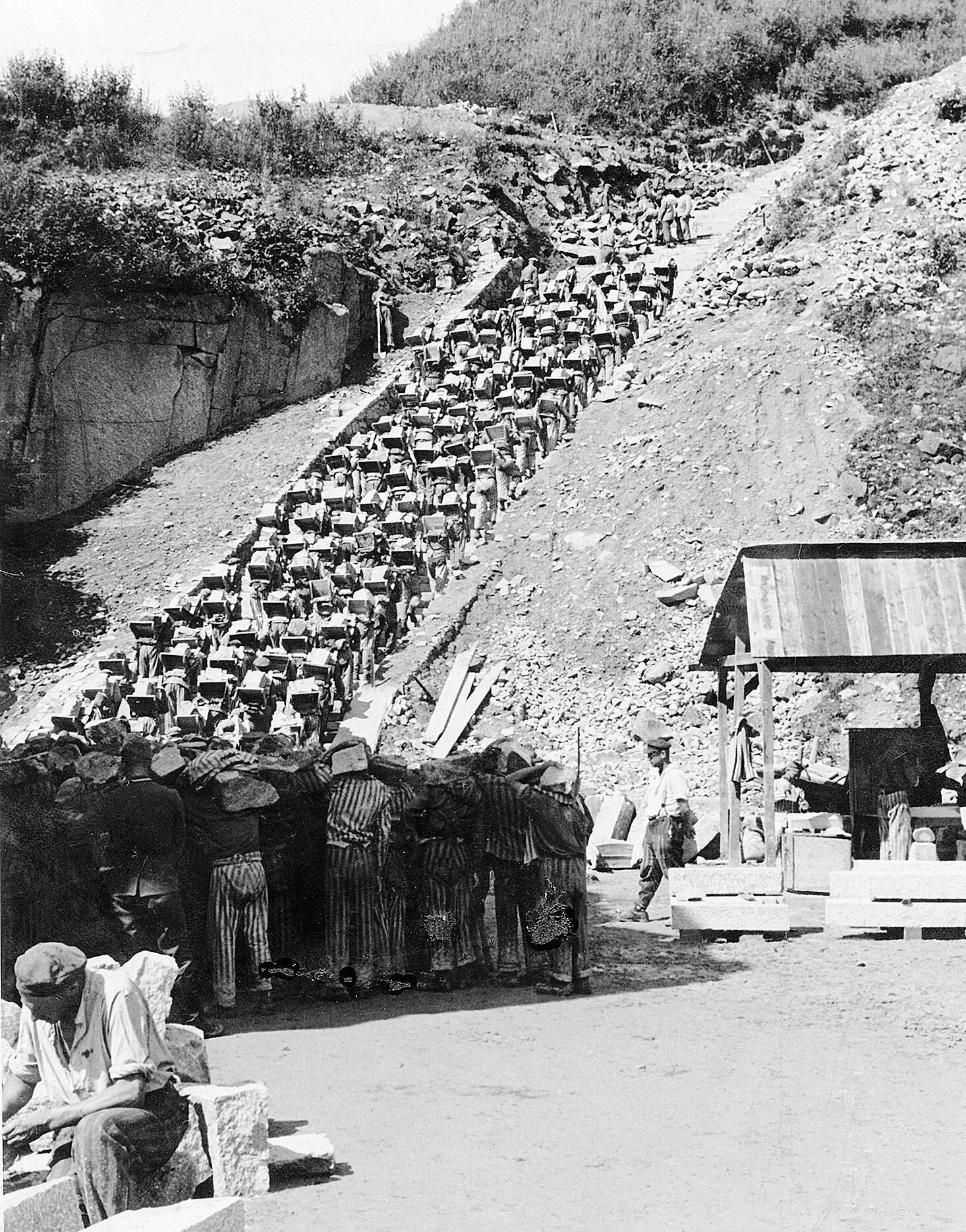
Wiener Graben quarry at Mauthausen: the "Stairs of Death"; prisoners were forced to carry granite blocks, some weighing up to 50 kg (110 lb) up 186 steps.

German Earth and Stone Works (German: Deutsche Erd- und Steinwerke GmbH, DEST) was an SS-owned company created to procure and manufacture building materials for state construction projects in Nazi Germany. DEST was a subsidiary company of Amtsgruppe W (Amt. W) of SS Main Economic and Administrative Office (WVHA). Both Amt. W and the WVHA were headed by Waffen-SS generals Oswald Pohl and Georg Lörner.

The headquarters for DEST were located in Sankt Georgen an der Gusen, a small town in Austria where Gusen II, a subcamp of Mauthausen, was built in 1944.

== History ==
DEST, founded on April 29, 1938, in Berlin, was administered by the WHVA for the purpose of procuring building materials and organizing slave labor and overseeing quarry operations. The Sachsenhausen (1936), Buchenwald (1937), Flossenbürg (1938), Mauthausen (1938), Gross Rosen (1940), and Neuengamme (1940), and Natzweiler-Struthof (1941) concentration camp sites were chosen because of their proximity to soil suitable for making bricks, or due to the close proximity of a brickworks factory or stone quarry.

DEST was widely successful in the exploitation of slave labor, most of whom were Jews, in the quarries. Human labor was used cruelly, becoming one of the main tenets of war crime charges in the Nuremberg Trials. The director of the program, SS-Obergruppenführer Oswald Pohl, who was stationed in Berlin, was sentenced to death for war crimes in 1947 in Nuremberg, and executed in 1951.

In 1943, DEST changed its focus from stone industry to armaments. From this time the organization played a important role, helping the SS to enter some key war industries. This was underlined by its industrial park at St. Georgen and Gusen that made the SS a major supplier of aircraft fuselages (Bf 109, Me 262), carbines and machine guns to companies like BFW, Messerschmitt and Steyr-Daimler-Puch. To run its business with the inmates of the Gusen and Mauthausen concentration camps, DEST operated its headquarters of Granitwerke Mauthausen between 1940 and 1945 in the town of Sankt Georgen an der Gusen, which was its biggest and most important "Werkgruppe" (industry group).

== See also ==
- Deutsche Wirtschaftsbetriebe
