= Friedrich Franz Bauer =

German SS photographer

Friedrich Franz Bauer (18 January 1903–1972) was a German SS photographer known for his images of propaganda made for the Nazis.

== History ==
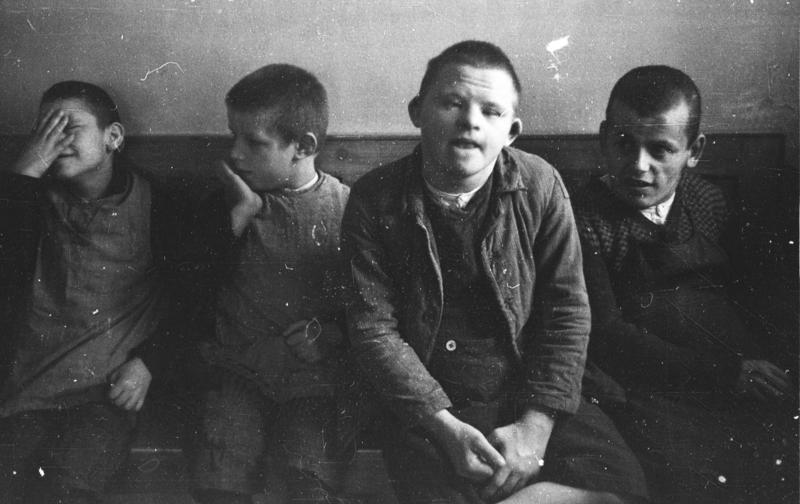
Children at Schönbrunn Psychiatric Hospital, 1934. Photo by SS photographer Franz Bauer

Bauer trained as a photographer in the studio of his parents in Pfaffenhofen an der Ilm, Bavaria. After that he studied at the "Bavarian State School for Photographers". Bauer was awarded several times for his photographic work. During the 1920s and 1930s he opened his own photography studio in Munich with his younger brother Karl Ferdinand. Due to financial difficulties his photography studio was acquired by the SS-Wirtschafts-Verwaltungshauptamt (SS Main Economic and Administrative Department) and renamed "Friedrich Franz Bauer GmbH" in 1937.

During the Nazi regime he was used to document events due to his personal contacts with Heinrich Himmler. He was known as Himmler's personal photographer.

On July 16, 1933, Bauer wrote and published a propaganda photo report about the Dachau concentration camp in the journal Munich Illustrated Press. It was under the title "Die Wahrheit über Dachau" (The Truth about Dachau). This report was intended to refute criticism of treatment of prisoners at the concentration camp by showing photos of prisoners' appearances to be "normal" and "well dressed".

He was present at important events such as the Anschluss and the German occupation of Czechoslovakia.
