= Jack W. Robbins =

American lawyer; Nuremberg Military Tribunals prosecutor

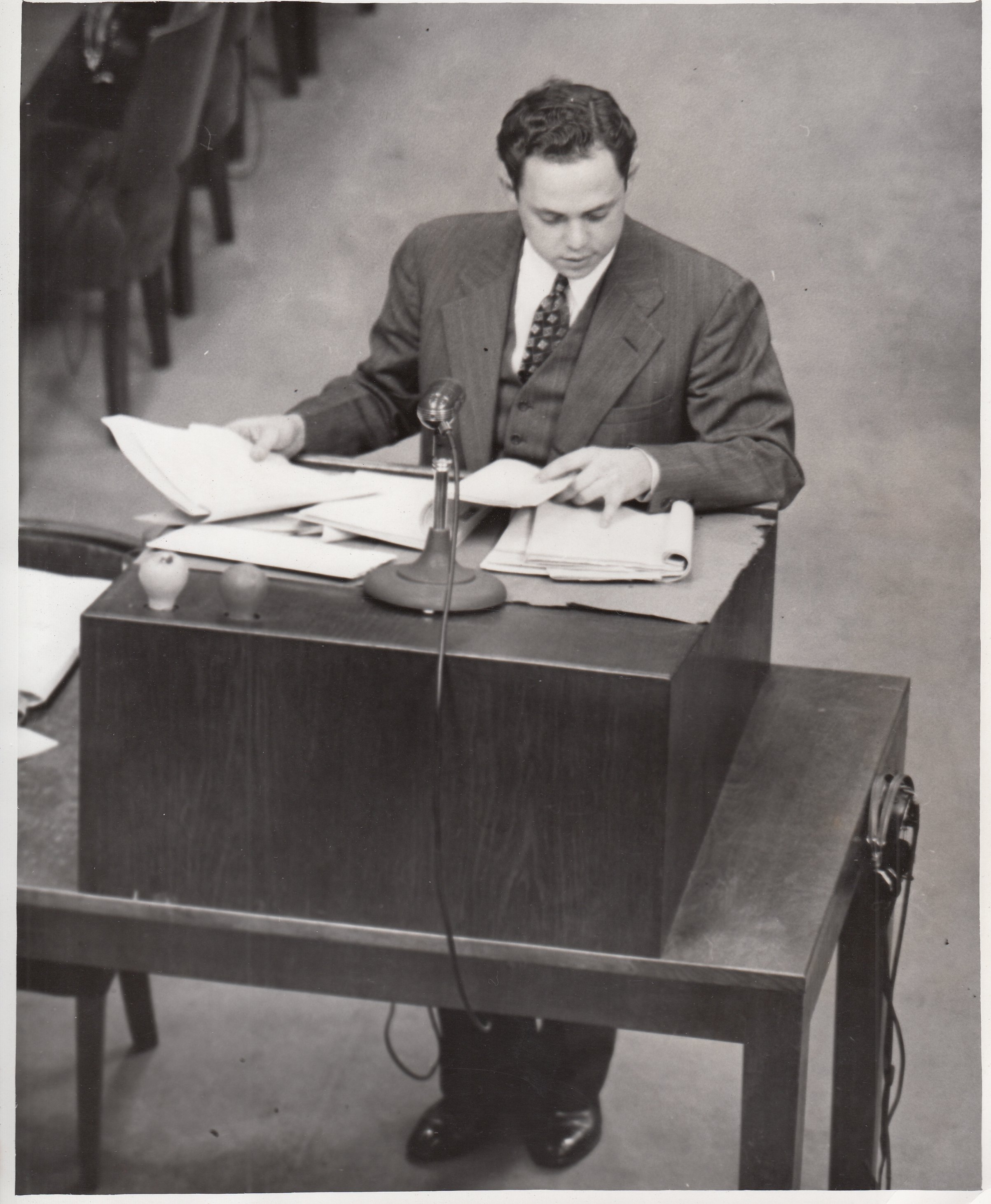
Jack W. Robbins, 15 March 1947.

Jack W. Robbins (1919–2005) was a principal prosecutor for the United States in the Pohl Trial. The Pohl Trial was the fourth of twelve trials for war crimes the U.S. authorities held in Nuremberg, Germany, after the end of World War II. Robbins was the youngest and longest-surviving prosecutor for the trial.
