= Georg Lörner =

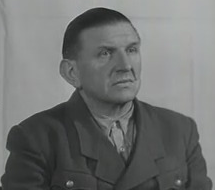
- Lörner in U.S. custody
- Born: 18 February 1899; München, Bavaria, German Empire
- Died: 21 April 1959 (aged 60); Rastatt, Baden-Württemberg, West Germany
- Status: Deceased
- Convictions: War crimes Crimes against humanity Membership in a criminal organization
- Trial: Pohl trial
- Penalty: Death; commuted to life imprisonment; further commuted to 15 years imprisonment
- SS career
- Allegiance: Nazi Germany
- Branch: Allgemeine SS
- Rank: SS-Gruppenführer

Georg Nikolaus Lörner (18 February 1899 – 21 April 1959) was a German SS functionary during the Nazi era. He served as Deputy Chief under Oswald Pohl, of the SS Main Economic and Administrative Office. Lörner was in charge of maintaining the clothing supplies for concentration camps.

== Concentration camps ==
The SS Main Economic and Administrative Office (WVHA) was set up to manage the quartermaster and paymaster duties of the SS, including originally the Waffen-SS, as well as handling the various financial enterprises of the Allgemeine SS, and the concentration camps.

Amtsgruppe B, was responsible for the supply of food and clothing for concentration camp inmates, and for supplying food, uniforms, equipment and camp quarters for the concentration camp guards of the SS-Totenkopfverbände.

Oswald Pohl was chief of Amtsgruppe W and Lörner was his deputy. Amt W was responsible for the operation and maintenance of various industrial, manufacturing, and service enterprises throughout Germany and the occupied countries, as well as providing clothing for concentration camp inmates.

== Trial ==
Georg Lörner was a defendant along with his brother, Hans Lörner, (b. 1893, Office 1, Office Group A) in U.S.A. v. Pohl et al. In their judgement, the tribunal took note of Lörner's assigned responsibilities and their importance.

"The first duty which a slave owner owes to his serfs is to feed, shelter, and clothe them properly. His own self-interest in maintaining their working capacity would seem to dictate no less. The story of the starvation and suffering of the concentration camp inmates, of their being beaten and abused and worked to death, is an old one and it would be idle to repeat it here. That they were under-fed and ill-clothed has been repeatedly proved before these Tribunals."

"Loerner was more than a mere purchasing agent or requisition clerk. He was a top-level administrative officer in charge of clothing supply, with all that that term implies. Pohl in an affidavit filed in the case (NO-2616, Pros. Ex. 523) states: 'It was the responsibility of Loerner to assure the provision of clothing to the concentration camp inmates.'"

"Fanslau corroborates this statement in his affidavit (NO-1909, Pros. Ex. 6): 'Georg Loerner was in the last resort responsible for the procurement of clothing for the prisoners.'"

"If WVHA was concerned with the last details of prisoners' wages, production and allocation, it was also concerned with furnishing food and clothing for prisoners, and this obligation carried down to the final step of distribution—actually seeing to it that the prisoners got the necessary supplies. The duty of administration goes that far. Clothing which is ordered or requisitioned but not delivered does not keep men from freezing."

"Loerner's defense is the typical one: 'That was the duty of somebody else.' He testified that all he could do was to receive the requisitions for clothing from Amtsgruppe D and process them by sending them to the SS clothing factories at Dachau. But the obligation of his responsible office did not end there. The industries in which he was so active as incorporator, director, and supervisor and to which he gave so much time and effort were the principal users of inmate labor. Both as an employer and as a supply officer it was his duty to see to it that the inmates were supplied with adequate clothing. It is not sufficient for him to say, 'Well, I've ordered clothing. That's all I'm supposed to do.' The lives of thousands of men depended on him doing more than that."

In November 1947, the tribunal ruled that Lörner shared responsibility in the conditions of the camps, in regard to the inadequate food and clothing supplies guilty of war crimes, crimes against humanity, and membership in a criminal organization. The sentences in the case were imposed on 3 November 1947. The presiding judge, Robert M. Toms, pronounced the sentences.

GEORG LOERNER, this Tribunal has adjudged you guilty under counts two, three, and four of the indictment filed in this case. For the crimes of which you have been convicted, the Tribunal sentences you to death by hanging.

In 1948, the convictions and sentences of the defendants, including that of Lörner, were reviewed after their lawyers presented new evidence. After reviewing the cases, the tribunal conceded that Lörner's involvement for clothing supplies did not include distribution, and that he had no involvement in the supplying of food. Consequently, it reduced Lörner's death sentence to life in prison. In 1951, Lörner sentence was further reduced to 15 years. He was released from Landsberg Prison on 31 March 1954.
