= Granitwerke Mauthausen =

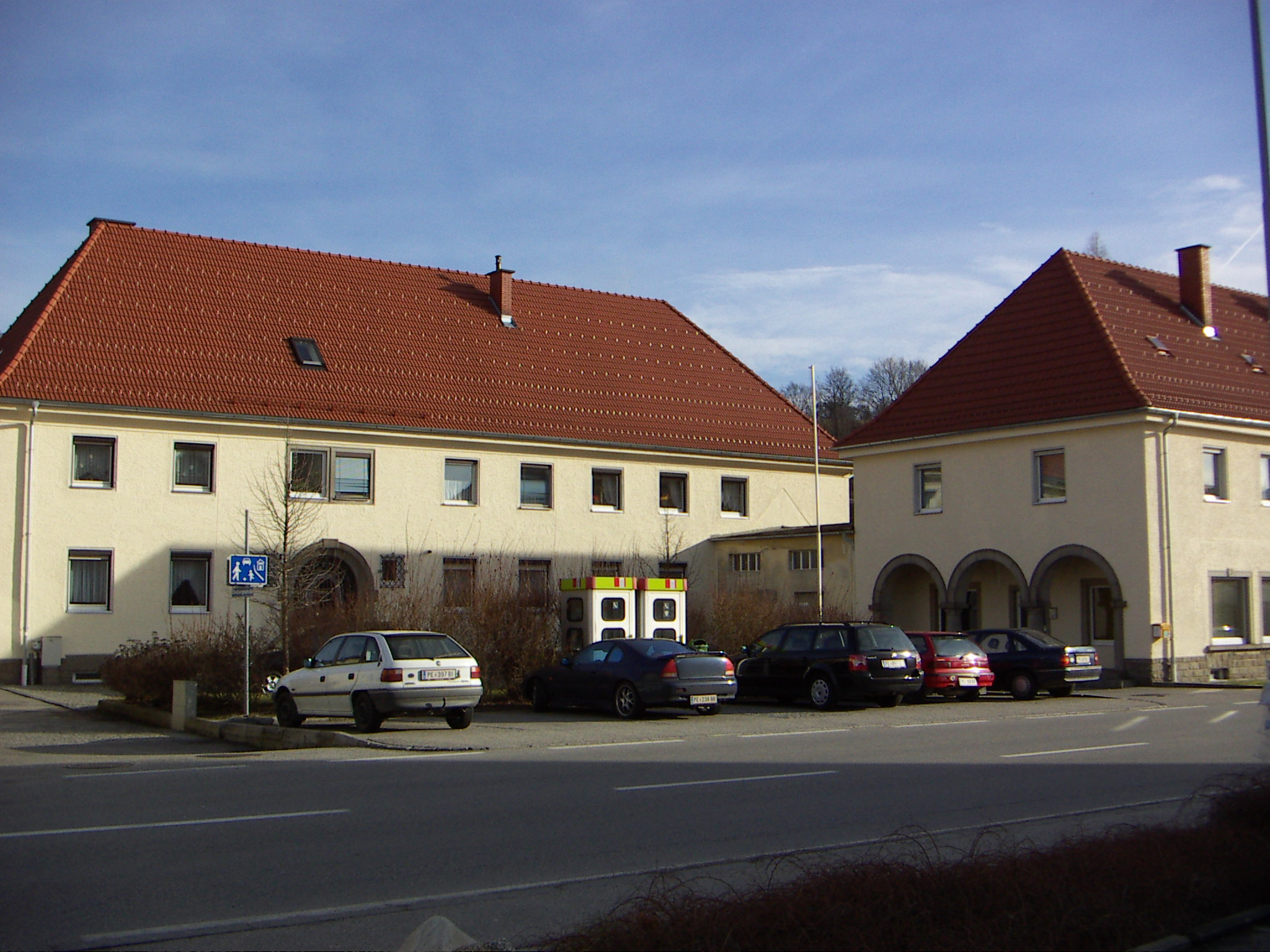
Administrative building where the DEST management team stayed in St. Georgen/Gusen

Granitwerke Mauthausen (Mauthausen Granite Works) was one of the names used by the DEST company (Deutsche Erd- und Steinwerke) for its branch based in Sankt Georgen an der Gusen and which exploited the slave manpower confined in certain subcamps of the Mauthausen-Gusen concentration camp system: Gusen I, Gusen II, Gusen III, and Mauthausen.

The quarries of Mauthausen-Gusen concentration camp, the same as all of the others that were managed by Granitwerke Mauthausen, were notorious for the terrible working conditions, which claimed thousands of lives.

The management office of Granitwerke Mauthausen was installed from 1940 to 1945 in Sankt Georgen an der Gusen, which was also called St. Georgen Business Office of Group W of the SS-Wirtschafts-Verwaltungshauptamt (WVHA). The Sankt Georgen group grew steadily from the years 1938 to 1945 to become the largest operation of the DEST. The Sankt Georgen DEST operation included the following camps:

- Gusen Kastenhof (which included the three quarries of Gusen – Gusen, Kastenhof and Pierbauer – located in Gusen concentration camp)
- Wienergraben quarry (the quarry of Mauthausen concentration camp)
- Beneschau (the quarries of the Benešov area, near Prague)
- Grossraming (stone operating centers named "Ostmark" (as the Nazis called Austria after the Anschluss)
- Department of Operations I (weapons production for infantry in cooperation with Steyr-Daimler-Puch, in Gusen)
- Operating Division II (series production of fuselages and wings for Messerschmitt Bf 109 fighters in cooperation with Messerschmitt GmbH Regensburg, in Gusen)
- Operating Division III (series production of fuselages for Messerschmitt Me 262 jet fighters in collaboration with Messerschmitt GmbH Regensburg in the subterranean factory complex B8 Bergkristall in St. Georgen an der Gusen)
- Department of Construction (cement production in Gusen)

These were the managers of the St. Georgen management group:

- Otto Walther (Production manager in St. Georgen)
- Alfred Grau (Managing director in St. Georgen)
- Paul Wolfram (Manager of the Gusen-Kastenhof quarries)
- Johannes Grimm (Manager of the Wienergraben quarries)

Walther directly reported to the department Amt W I/2 of the WVHA (Schneider, SS-Standartenführer Walter Salpeter, Heinz Schwarz and SS-Hauptsturmführer "Assessor" Karl Mummenthey). Since 1942, Franz Ziereis, the commandant of Mauthausen concentration camp, held the position (and salary) of director of operations of the St. Georgen DEST office.

After the war, the DEST goods in St. Georgen were claimed as "German property" and were confiscated, passing into the hands of the Soviet Union. Some of the facilities were operated under the name "Granitwerke Gusen" until 1955, when the Administration for Soviet Property in Austria ceased operations in Austria. Since 1955, the Austrian Republic used the name Deutsche Erd- und Steinwerke GmbH Berlin, St. Georgen an der Gusen, a company that managed the assets of the DEST St. Georgen group until the 1960s.

== Bibliography ==
- Rudolf A. Haunschmied, Jan-Ruth Mills, Siegi Witzany-Durda: St. Georgen-Gusen-Mauthausen - Concentration Camp Mauthausen Reconsidered. BoD, Norderstedt 2008, ISBN 978-3-8334-7440-8
