= Robert M. Toms =

American judge (1886–1960)

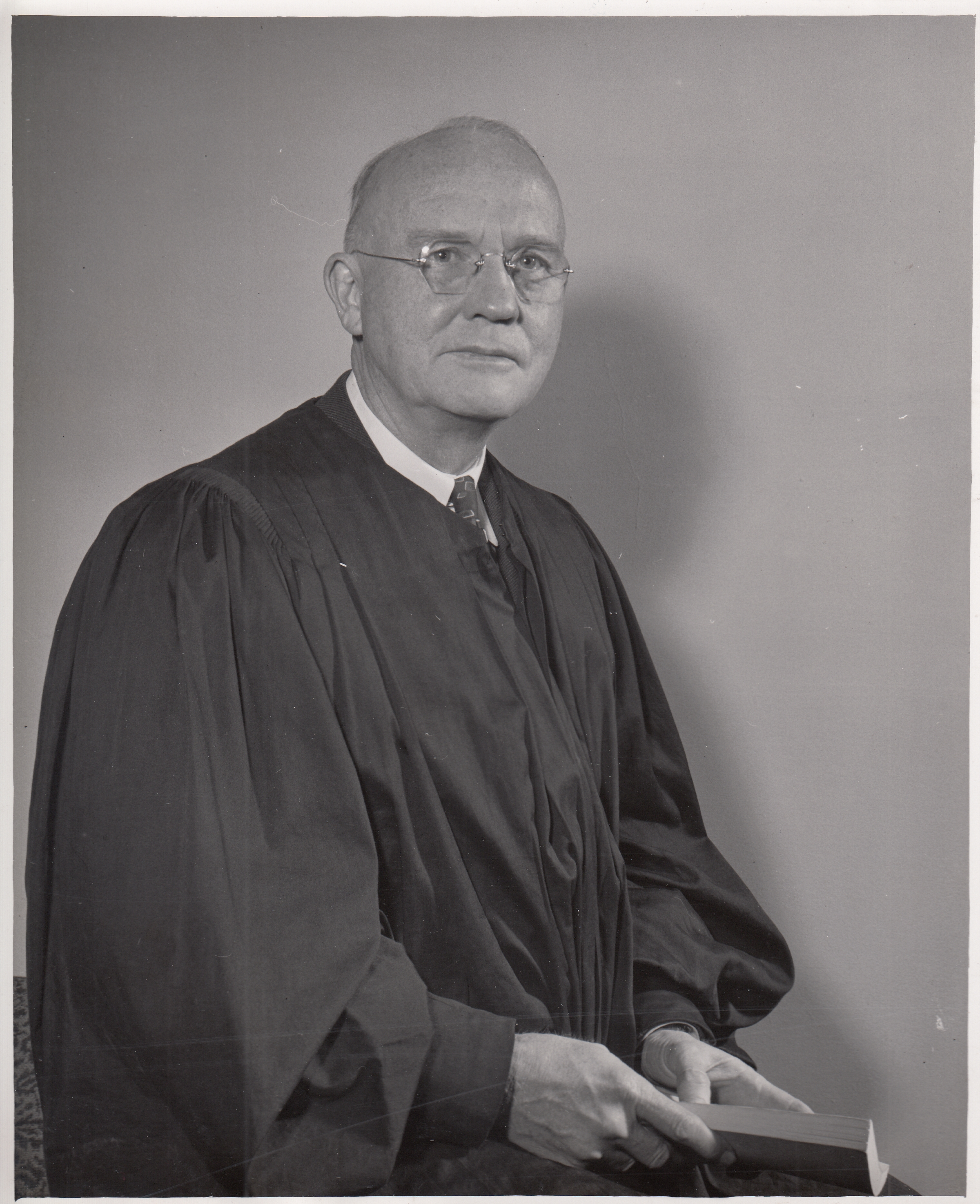
- Judge Robert M. Toms of the Milch Trial, 2 January 1947-17 April 1947 (second of the Subsequent Nuremberg Trials)

Judge of the Third Judicial Circuit Court
- In office 1929–1959

Presiding Judge of the Nuremberg Military Tribunal II
- In office 1947–1947

Personal details
- Born: Robert Morrell Toms; October 14, 1886 La Crosse, Wisconsin, U.S.
- Died: April 7, 1960 (aged 73) Detroit, Michigan
- Party: Republican
- Education: University of Chicago; University of Michigan, J.D.

Robert M. Toms (October 14, 1886 - April 7, 1960) was an American jurist, actor, playwright, composer, and professor from Michigan. While on the bench in the Third Judicial Circuit, he is said to have tried about 40,000 cases. He taught Constitutional law at Wayne State University.

== Early life and education ==
Robert was born in La Crosse, Wisconsin. He was born to Frank P. Toms and Lark (Looney) Toms. Toms' grandfather was one of the pioneer settlers in Oakland County, Michigan. He attended the public schools of Chicago and earned an A.B. degree from University of Chicago in 1907 and an LL.B. from the University of Michigan Law School in 1910. He was awarded an honorary degree by Wayne State University in 1956. He married Gladys B. Wetmore November 11, 1914 and had two daughters, Elinor (Toms) Jones and Margaret (Toms) Cope.

in the 1918 Michigan Bench & Bar Journal he was listed as member of the Detroit Bar Association, Corinthian Lodge, F. & A.M., Detroit Board of Commerce, Fellowcraft Club, Sigma Alpha Epsilon

== Legal career ==
=== Wayne County Prosecutors office ===
In July 1912, he was appointed an assistant prosecutor and he served two years under Hugh Shepherd and Allan Frazer. He was appointed to replace Leopold A. Kosolnski. He left the office from 1914 to 1920 and was in private practice with the firm Schmalzriedt, Spaulding & Toms. In 1920 he was appointed to become chief assistant prosecutor under Paul W. Voorhies. He was elected to serve in the Wayne County Prosecutor's Office in 1924 and served two terms as Wayne County Prosecutor. He held the office till he was elected to the Circuit bench in the spring 1929 election.

=== 1915 Run for Prosecuting attorney ===
Toms ran for the office of Prosecuting attorney of Wayne County in 1915; he was unsuccessful. The primary election for the Republican nomination was stuck in legal battles. Toms filed a motion in the circuit court to restrain/stop the election commission from counting votes of Charles H. Jasnowski, Guy A Miller and Proctor K. Owens. It was claimed that the men's names were on the ballots in violation of the law. The court of appeals stated in a unanimous decision, which held "if there was any error in printing the names on the ballots, the great mass of voters should not be disfranchised because they voted in good faith.

=== Petition to remove Judge George J Kolowich ===
In January of 1921, as chief assistant prosecuting attorney Toms filed a petition to Governor Alex J. Groesbeck to ask for the removal of Justice George J Kolowich. It was accused that Judge Kolowich paid policemen $1 each to divert cases to his court. This was admitted to Prosecutor Paul W. Voorhies. In seven cases, Joseph Bahorski, an investigator for the prosecutor's office, claimed that paperwork had been lost.

=== Bill making child marriage invalid ===
In 1921, Toms, then chief assistant prosecutor, sent a draft bill to the Legislature that would nullify any common law marriage where either party is under the age of 16. This was because on June 18, 1920 the Michigan Supreme Court held that such common law marriages were legal even when the girl was only 14-years-old.

=== 1924 Run for Prosecuting Attorney ===
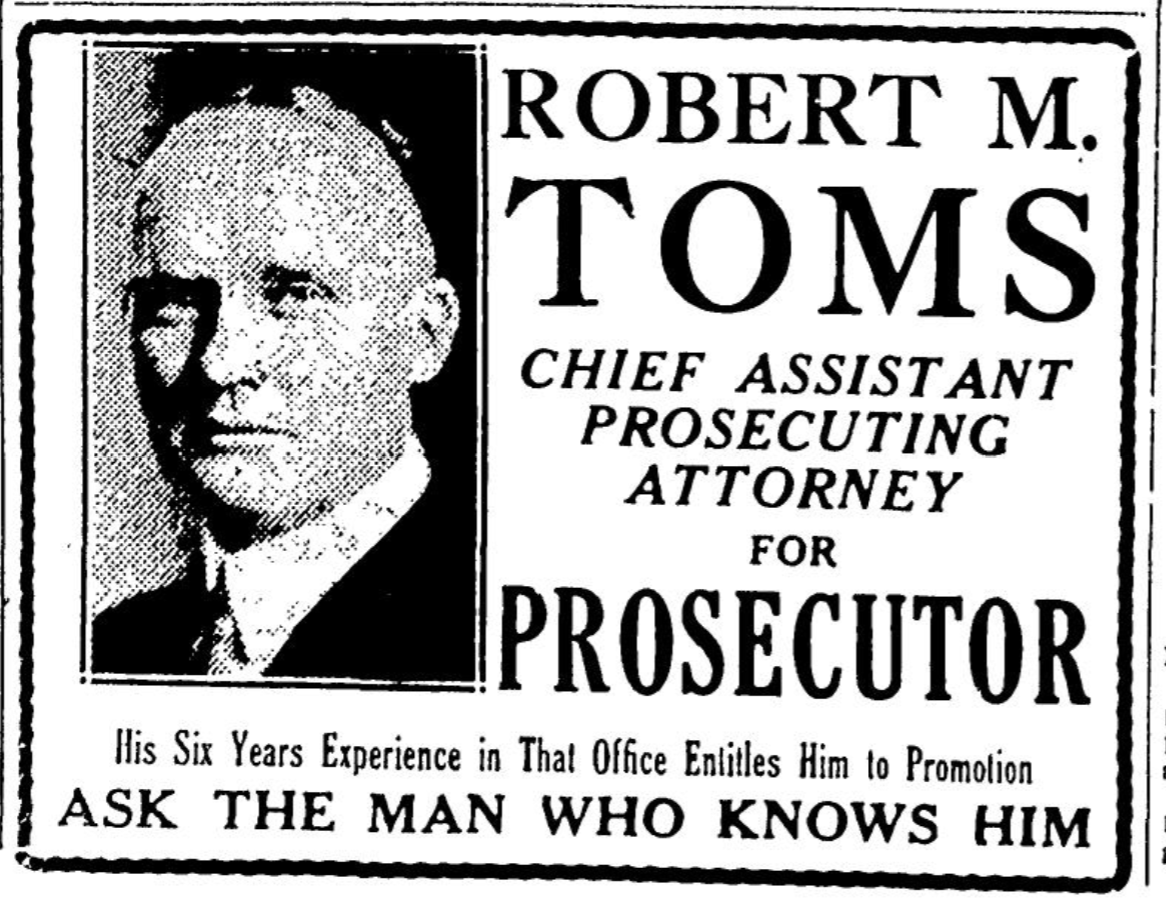
Robert M. Toms 1924 ad for Wayne County Prosecuting Attorney

In 1924 Toms once again ran for the office of Wayne County Prosecuting attorney. He ran in a primary against 6 other men.

- Frederick B Brown
- Robert M. Toms
- Oscar A. Riopelle
- Frank C. Sibley
- Elton R. Nellis
- William J. Harcourt
- Charles P. O'Neil

The Election came down to Louis W. McClear(D) and Toms(R). During the election there was a question if Toms was affiliated with the Ku Klux Klan. Toms denied "that he has ever had any affiliation with the Ku Klux Klan," and said "that he has never desired to capitalize [on] religious or racial differences for his own political purposes." Tom spent $2,361.27 for the committee to elect him, $691.27 came from people in the Prosecutor office, $66.27 came from himself. The votes were 272,327 for Toms and only 45,426 for McClear.

Toms was the first prosecutor to appoint a non-white assistant prosecuting attorney. He appointed Lloyd A. Loomis who was the first African American appointed as prosecutor staff in Wayne County Michigan.

While in office Toms' car was stolen while his wife was taking their daughter Margaret to the doctors office; this was between Woodward and John R Street. The car was found a week later near Dexter Boulevard where the police found fishing tackle that was left behind by the person who took the car. His car was stolen again when he and his wife were attending the theater; this was after he locked his car and removed the distributor from it.

=== Judge of Recorders Court Candidate ===
In 1915, Toms ran as the Republican candidate for Recorders Court. He lost the election to William F. Connolly, who got 20,387 votes to Toms 12,347 votes.

=== Third Judicial Circuit Court ===
In the 1929 Election for Wayne County Judges there were 29 candidates for 14 judicial spots in the primary. Robert M. Toms was the candidate with the 14th highest vote count. He secured 43,947 votes. the candidate with 15th most votes was Judge L. Eugene Sharp with 43,011 which was just a 936-vote lead. Circuit Judge L. Eugene Sharp requested a recount. The office of Circuit Court Judge was a six-year term starting 1 January with a salary of $13,500.00. On March 19, 1929, Judge L. Eugene Sharp conceded defeat when the recount in the primary election return ended with 43,839 for Toms and Sharp had 42,845, decreasing Toms' lead to only 679 votes.

In the general election Toms came in at 8th place for the judgeship with a total of 101,249 votes.

Prior to taking office, a story broke that out of the Record Court under Judge Frank Murphy (who went on to be a Governor of Michigan, and Supreme Court Justice) that 75 Court Cases' files vanished, making it impossible to prosecute charges. Of those cases, 64 were for defendants that had been accused of violating the prohibition laws. Other case files missing were for breaking and entering, malfeasance in office, bribery, soliciting personal injury claim, gambling law violations, obstructing, uttering and publishing, and embezzlement. After investigation by then clerk of court Charles W. Casgrain showed 42 missing files after finding part of them. Casgrain stated "he would find them all."

Toms, who was prosecuting attorney at the times the files went missing, filed a motion with the Judge John V. Brennan, duplicate files of 23 of the missing files and was working on 11 other files. Yet nine files went missing again having a card in the file that bore the notation "missing."

Prosecuting Attorney James E. Chenot launched the investigation. Judge Murphy offered a statement "I told Mr. Culver that the only knowledge I have of the missing files was what I had read in the news paper." He went on to say "I told him to find out just how true the reports were and to lay the matter before me and I would start an investigation.

As Judge-elect Toms had a period of time to wait before he was to take office, and after leaving the office of the prosecuting attorney, he once again entered private practice of law opening a law office doing general law practice. Tom's election to office was supposed to start his term on January 1, 1930. However, the Michigan Legislature created four more judgeships in Wayne County. Governor Fred Warren Green appointed him to one of the new judicial positions in August 1929. Gov. Green stated "I have appointed Robert M. Toms, who has already been elected by the people to take office next January. It would not be fair to him to have four judges who have been appointed several months after his election become his seniors on the bench."

In April 1946 while serving as judge his car was stolen again from the Detroit Athletic Club. It was found in Ann Arbor two days later after the car thief John C. Reeves crashed into a parked car.

=== Sweet Trials 1925-26 ===
Toms was the prosecutor for the Dr. Ossian Sweet & Henry Sweet trials. The case was tried before judge Frank Murphy. Dr. Sweet was a black Detroit physician who spent time studying in Vienna & Paris where he spent time working with Marie Curie. Not wanting to live in the slums in red-lined housing areas he and a friend bought homes in white neighborhoods but had to leave them because of white hostility.

He found a home located at 29058 Garland Avenue in one of the lower-middle-class white neighborhoods. The seller of the home was a white woman and a black husband. He thought this was would help him be accepted by the neighbors. The Sweet family moved in on September 8, 1925.

At the time, the Ku Klux Klan was very active in the area. A large crowd started to gather and turned into a mob. After a while, the mob had dispersed, and the next night a new one formed. It is unclear how many people were there, but it is suspected that it was a few hundred people. The Sweets had ten other friends in the house. The mob started to grow, and people started throwing rocks and breaking windows of the home. Gunfire broke out from several windows of the house. In the background, Leon Breiner was shot and killed. The police broke into the house and arrested all 11 occupants.

Then Toms got indictments against the 11 occupants for conspiracy to commit murder. The defendants went to the National Association for the Advancement of Colored People who contracted Clarence Darrow to provide the defense.

One of the trial strategies of Toms that has been criticized was his use of seventy-five witnesses to testify the absence of a crowd. Some have stated "Much of the prosecution's case consisted of the testimony of seventy-five witnesses who swore they saw no crowds near the Sweets' house on the night of 9 September. Apparently, the irony of having seventy-five witnesses testify to the absence of a crowd was lost on the prosecution."

An all-white jury deliberated for three days and could not reach a verdict; the judge declared a mistrial. In April 1926, Toms indicted Henry Sweet, who admitted to firing the gun. The second trial was for murder. Sweet was acquitted, and then Toms moved to dismiss the charges against all defendants.

Clarence Darrow after the trial would describe Toms in the following way "as one of the fairest and most humane prosecutors that I ever met."

=== Nuremberg Trials ===
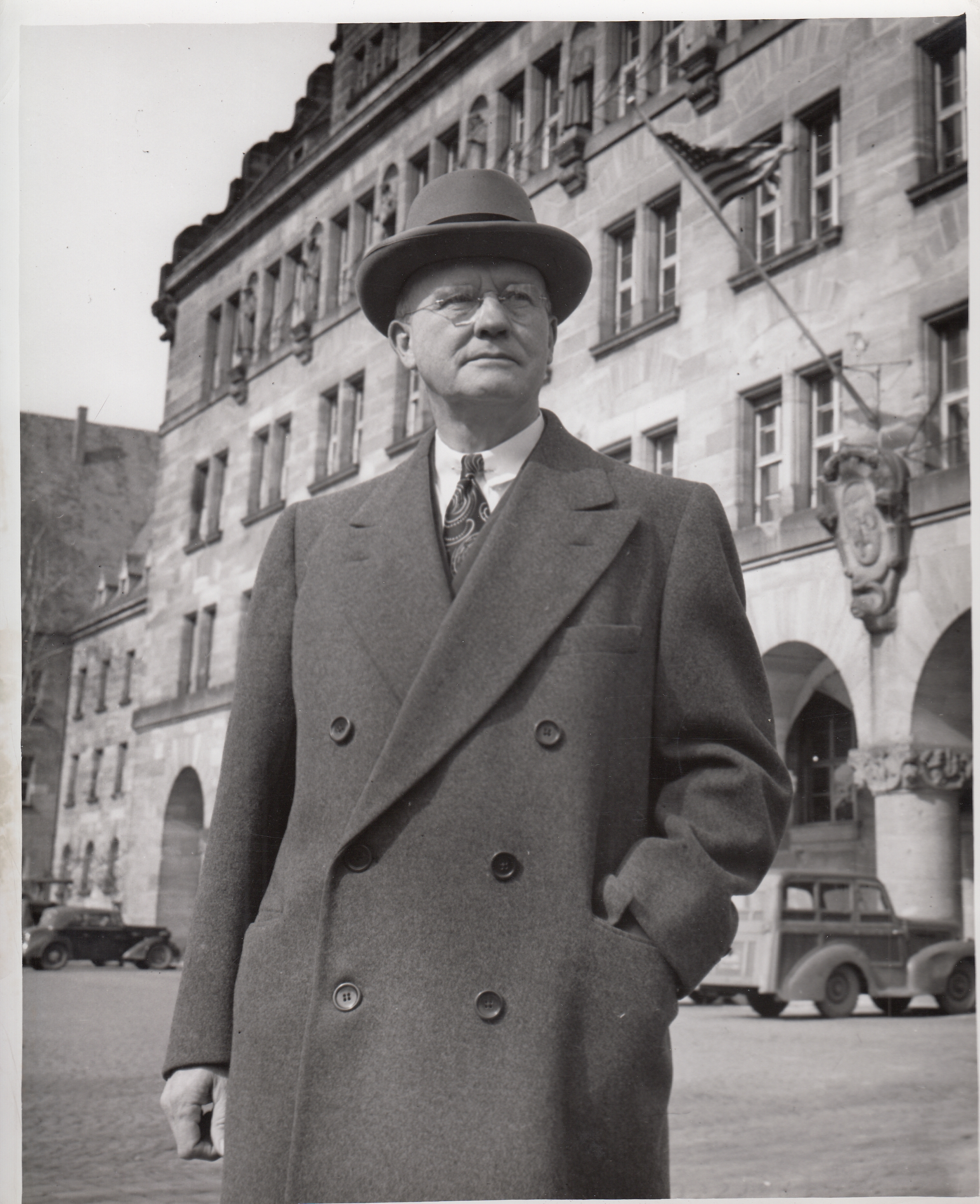
Judge Robert M. Toms at the Palace of Justice, Nuremberg during the Milch Trial, 2 January 1947-17 April 1947 (second of the Subsequent Nuremberg Trials)

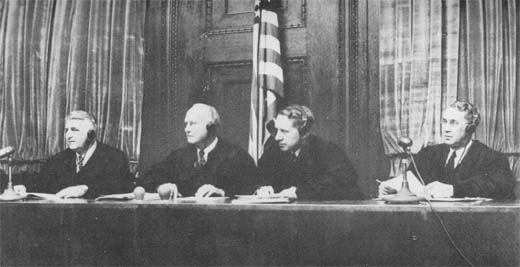
The judges of the Nuremberg Military Tribunal II, Case IV: „Pohl Case“ or „WHVA Case“. From left to right: Donald Phillips, Robert M. Toms (presiding judge), Michael A. Musmanno, John J. Speight (alternate judge). This photograph was taken by US Army photographers on behalf of the Office of Chief of Counsel for War Crimes (OCCWC) during the trial.

President Harry S. Truman the 33rd President of the United States appointed Toms as member of the Military Tribunal established for the Trial and Punishments of Major War Criminals in Germany under Executive order 9819. He oversaw the trial of Erhard Milch and sentenced him to life in prison. He also tried 18 concentration camp commanders and administrators in the Oswald Pohl case. He presided over ten trials. Three commanders were acquitted, four were sentenced to death, three were sentenced to life imprisonment, and eight were given sentences ranging from 10-years to 25 years.

When Judge Toms returned from his time in Germany he said the uniform defense of the German defendants was "I was ordered to do it; I was just a little man following the orders of my superiors.

While not required to give up his pay to the county while he was on leave of absence to serve the Federal Government; he returned the $5,338.39 which represented the full amount of his pay less taxes for his work on the U.S. War Crimes Tribunal at Nurnberg Germany.

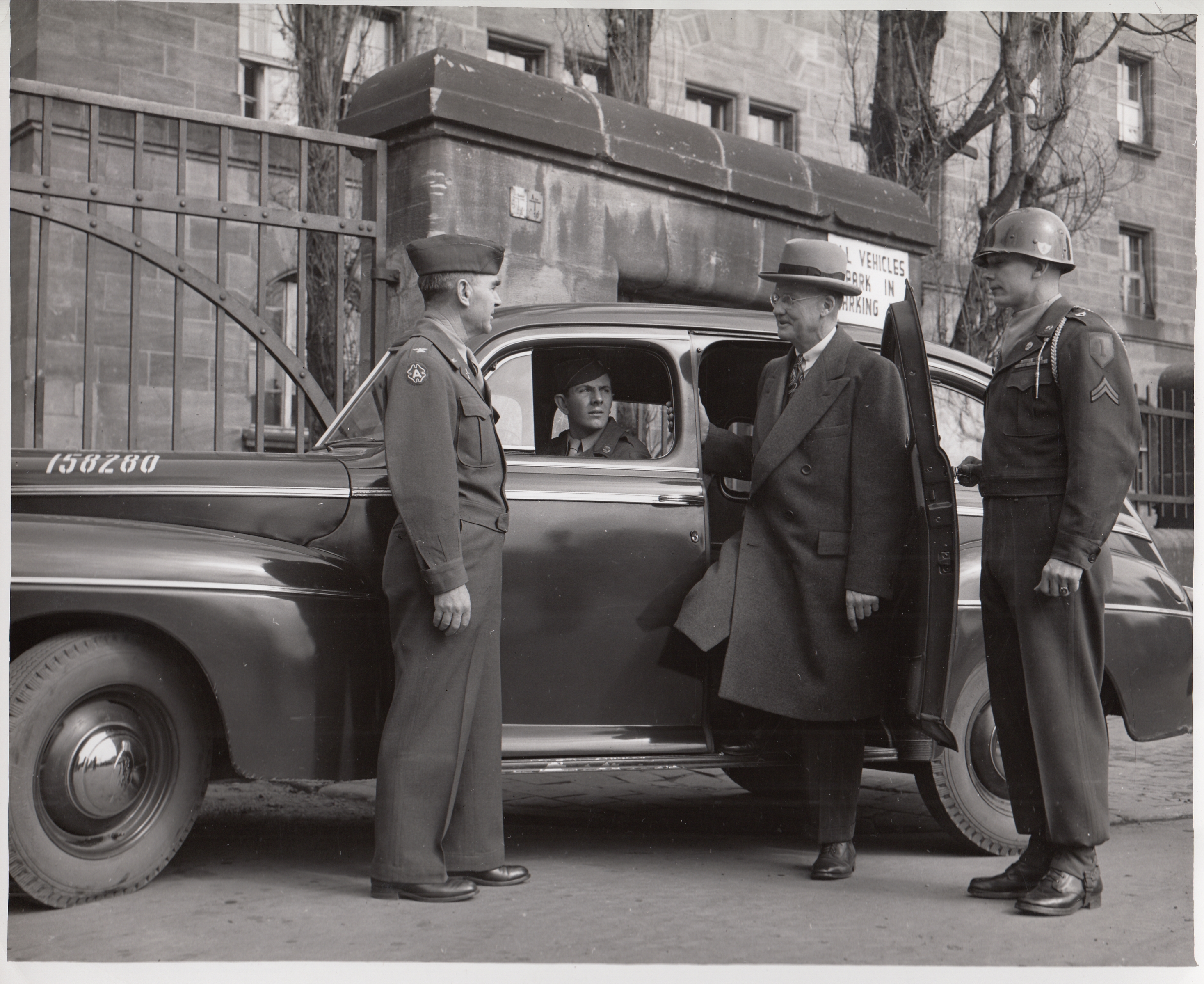
Judge Robert M. Toms arrives at Courthouse in Germany

== Actor ==
Toms was an active actor for many years in local plays. While assistant prosecuting attorney for Wayne County he played the part of Father Time in the play The Blue Bird (play) by Maurice Maeterlinck for three nights. He performed with 40 children of the neighborhood of Fort Street Settlements.

== Playwright ==
He wrote the play "And Points West." It was performed at the Detroit Players Club. In 1919, his play "The Changeling" was performed by the Players.

== Song writer ==
He wrote "I Kinda Like Ann Arbor" and other campus songs.

== Views on capital punishment ==
For his life, he was opposed to capital punishment. He was opposed to it on moral grounds and efficacy. "I do not believe, that the introduction of the death penalty would serve in any way as a deterrent to the men who do the killing. These crimes are not premeditated and the criminal when he draws his gun, does not stop to think whether the punishment he faces is death or a long period of imprisonment. He doesn't in fact, consider the possibility of getting caught and punished for using his gun.

His view on this was challenged when he was the presiding judge on the Nazi war crimes trials in Nuernberg. When he heard the damaging testimony against some of the "arrogant SS officers on trial before him, he complied with the death sentences of the two judges serving with him without batting an eye."
