= Oswald Pohl =

German Nazi, head of the SS Main Economic and Administrative Office (1892–1951)

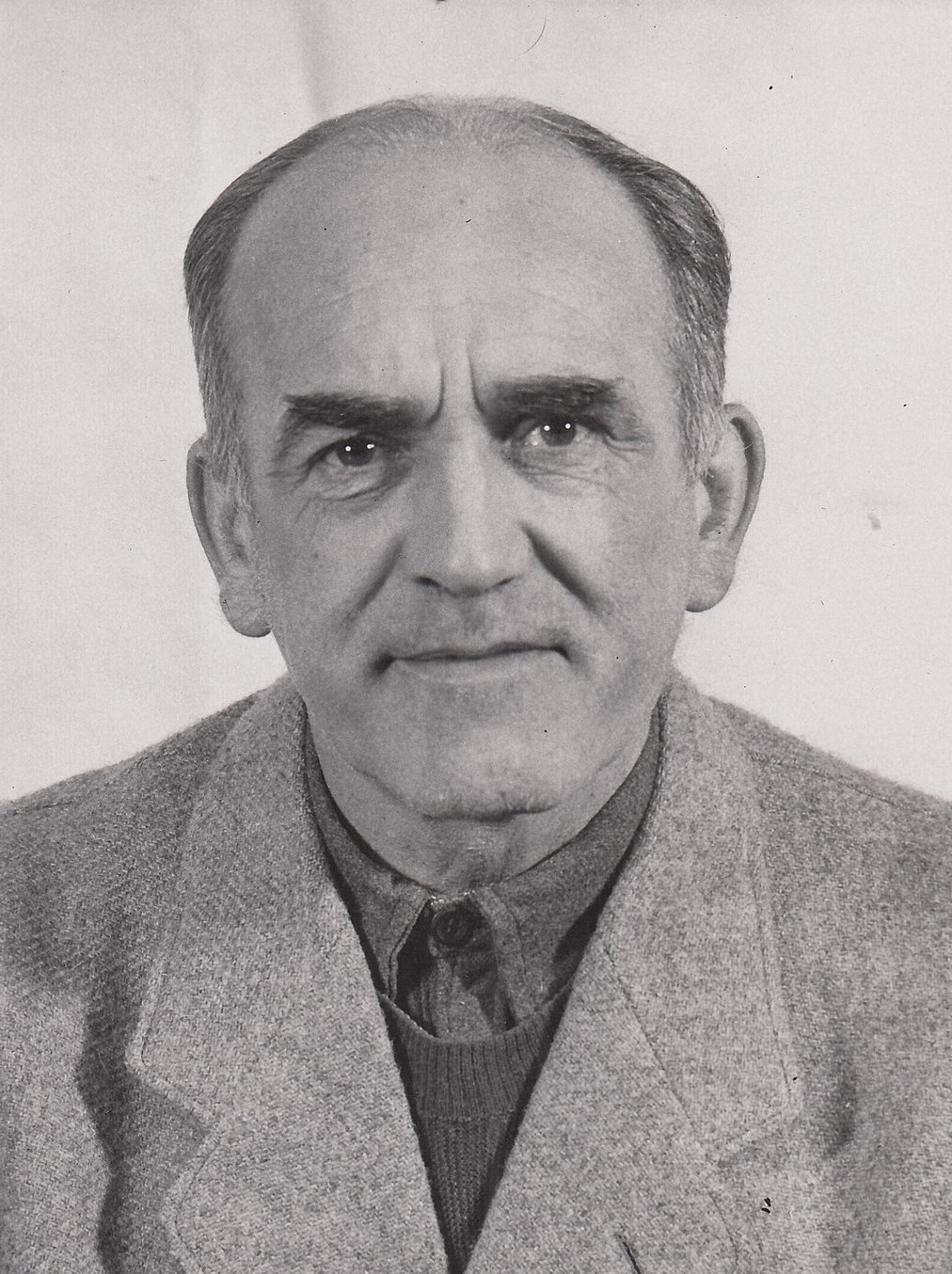
- Pohl in U.S. custody
- Born: 30 June 1892; Duisburg-Ruhrort, Rhine Province, Prussia, German Empire
- Died: 7 June 1951 (aged 58); Landsberg Prison, Landsberg am Lech, West Germany
- Cause of death: Execution by hanging
- Occupation: Head of the SS Main Economic and Administrative Office
- Known for: Business administrator of Nazi concentration camp system
- Status: Executed
- Motive: Nazism
- Convictions: War crimes Crimes against humanity Membership in a criminal organization
- Trial: Pohl Trial
- Penalty: Death

Details
- Victims: Millions
- Span of crimes: 1939–1945
- Country: Multiple countries across Europe
- Location: Nazi concentration camps
- Date apprehended: 27 May 1946
- SS career
- Allegiance: Nazi Germany
- Branch: Waffen-SS
- Rank: SS-Obergruppenführer und General der Waffen-SS
- Commands: SS Main Economic and Administrative Office

Oswald Ludwig Pohl (German: [ˈɔsvalt ˈpoːl]; 30 June 1892 – 7 June 1951) was a German high-ranking SS official during the Nazi era. As the head of the SS Main Economic and Administrative Office and the head administrator of the Nazi concentration camps, he was a key figure in the Holocaust.

Born in Duisburg, Pohl served in the Imperial German Navy in the Baltic Sea and at the Flemish coast during the First World War. After the war he worked with the Freikorps and took part in the Kapp Putsch, after which he joined the Reichsmarine. Pohl became a member of the SA in 1925 and a Nazi Party member a year later. He subsequently became a close associate of Heinrich Himmler and established himself as a capable administrator within the SS. In 1942, Himmler appointed Pohl chief of the SS Main Economic and Administrative Office, placing him in charge of all concentration camps and their exploitation of forced labour, SS and Police building projects and SS economic enterprises; he was also made SS-Obergruppenführer. At the time he was the third most powerful SS figure after Himmler and Reinhard Heydrich.

Pohl went into hiding after the war but was apprehended by British troops in 1946. He stood in the eponymous Pohl Trial in 1947, was found guilty of war crimes and crimes against humanity and sentenced to death by an American military tribunal. After repeated appeals, he was executed by hanging in 1951.

== Early life and career ==
Oswald Pohl was born in Duisburg-Ruhrort on 30 June 1892 to blacksmith, Hermann Otto Emil Pohl, and his wife Auguste Pohl (née Seifert); he was the fifth of eight children. His parents were financially secure, and he attended a Realgymnasium where he studied classical Greek and Latin texts. From what Pohl claimed, he always wanted to study science but his father did not have the means to send him straight to university. In 1912, he became a sailor in the Imperial Navy. During World War I, he served in the Baltic Sea region and the coast of Flanders. Pohl attended a navy school, and became paymaster on 1 April 1918. On 30 October of the same year, he married.

After the end of the war, Pohl attended courses at a trade school, and began studying law and state theory at the Christian-Albrechts-Universität in Kiel. He dropped out of university, and became paymaster for the Freikorps "Brigade Löwenfeld", working in Berlin, Upper Silesia and the Ruhr basin. In 1920, like many others involved in the Lüttwitz-Kapp Putsch, he was accepted into the Weimar Republic's new navy, the Reichsmarine. Pohl was transferred to Swinemünde in 1924.

== SS career ==
In 1925, Pohl became a member of the Sturmabteilung (SA), then joined the re-founded Nazi Party on 22 February 1926 (membership number 30,842). Pohl proclaimed in 1932, "I was a National Socialist before National Socialism came into being." Commissioned as an SA-Sturmführer in August 1932, he advanced to SA-Obersturmführer in June 1933 and to SA-Sturmbannführer in August 1933. He met Heinrich Himmler in 1933, coming to his attention at the behest of Admiral Wilhelm Canaris who described Pohl as an "energetic" officer and a "dedicated Nazi". Pohl quickly made himself available to the younger Himmler after their first meeting at a Kiel Biergarten. While he already presided over as many as 500 men in his role in the German Navy, as a dedicated Nazi, he jumped at the chance to be a commissioned officer in Himmler's Schutzstaffel (SS). Pohl promised Himmler that he would serve him always and rose quickly due to his "ruthlessness" and his unwavering "loyalty". He entered the SS with an effective date of 1 February 1934 (SS number 147,614) with the rank of SS-Standartenführer.

Pohl set to work, putting his 20-plus years of administrative experience into action; he managed to successfully standardize and professionalize the SS accounting operations, so much so that it was able to withstand a public audit, which garnered more respect from national agencies for Himmler's SS. Pohl was quickly promoted as a result, and by 9 September 1934 was advanced to SS-Oberführer. Capable administrative officers were recruited and assigned to the concentration camps due to Pohl's efforts. Eventually Pohl was appointed chief of the administration department in the personal staff of the Reichsführer-SS. His career continued to thrive when Himmler made him administrative chief over the SD Main Office and the Race and Settlement Office on 1 June 1935. He was promoted to SS-Brigadeführer the same day. Two of Pohl's predecessors, Paul Weickert and Gerhard Schneider, were dismissed from the SS for embezzlement. Pohl founded the "Gesellschaft zur Förderung und Pflege deutscher Kulturdenkmäler" ("Society for the preservation and fostering of German cultural monuments"), which was primarily dedicated to restoring Wewelsburg, an old castle that was supposed to be turned into a cultural and scientific headquarters of the SS at Himmler's request. The "society" soon became a part of Pohl's SS administration office. Pohl left the Roman Catholic Church in 1935. Apart from his work in the SS, Pohl served briefly in the Reichstag as a deputy for electoral constituency 22 (Düsseldorf East) from July 1942 to March 1943.

== Concentration camp administrator and WVHA chief ==
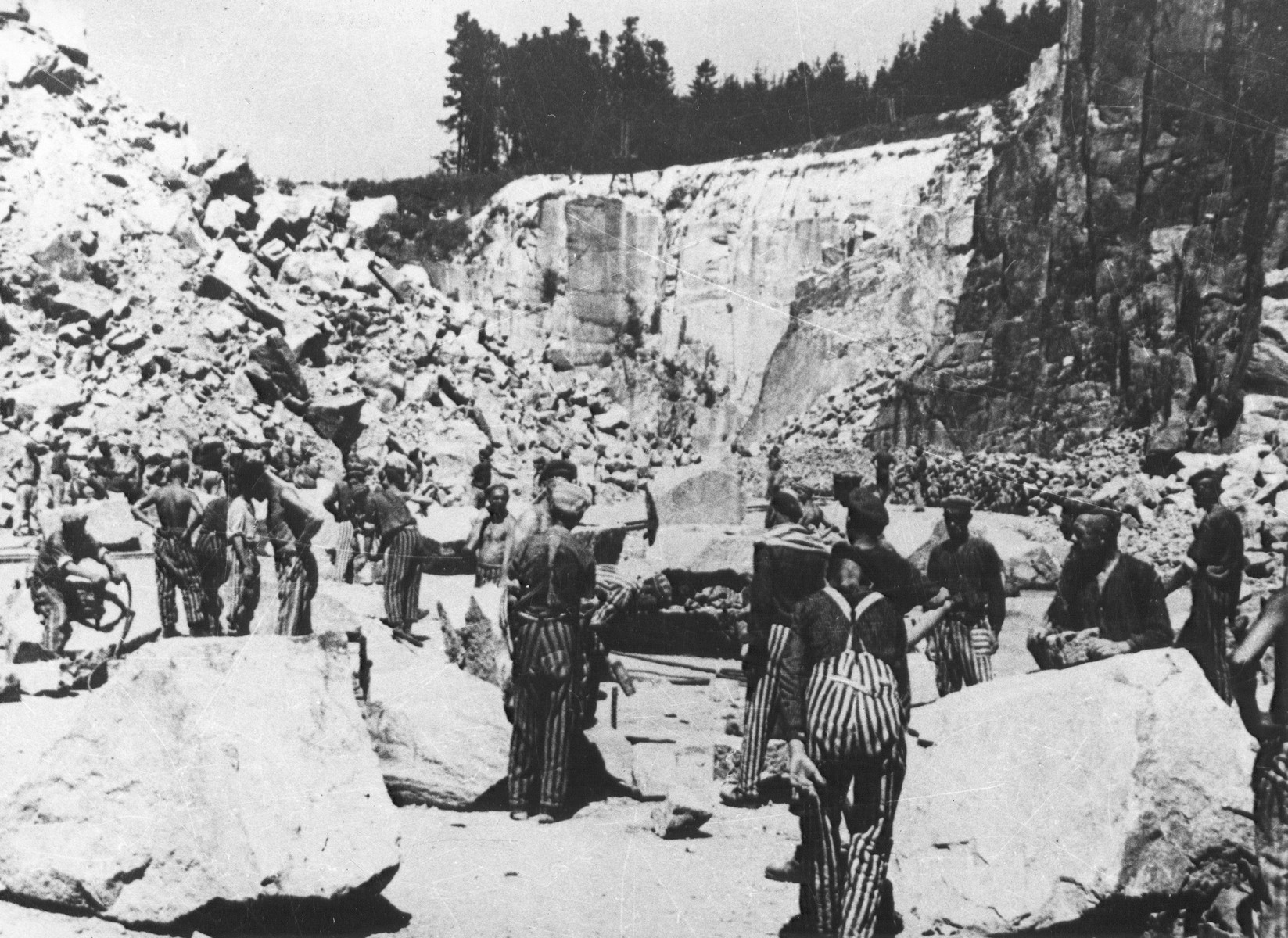
Forced labor at Wiener Graben quarry at Mauthausen, 1942

Over time, Pohl's orbit of responsibility began to include the concentration camp system since he lived near the camp at Dachau and inspected them from time to time. He was promoted to SS-Gruppenführer on 30 January 1937, and Himmler gave him responsibility for all SS building construction in April. During the early establishment of the concentration camps in the mid-1930s, Pohl already recognized the economic potential of forced labor. Shortly after the Austrian Anschluss in March 1938, Pohl, who at this time was already administrative chief of the SS Main Office, accompanied Himmler to the small town of Mauthausen where it was decided that the SS-operated German Earth and Stoneworks Corporation (DEST) would begin excavating granite, using concentration camp prisoners as slave laborers. Administrative and financial authority for the camps and the SS Death's Head troops were conveyed to Pohl by 1938, which pitted him against his contemporary and peer, Theodor Eicke, particularly on matters of administration, budget, and building projects.

In June 1939 Pohl became chief of both the Verwaltung und Wirtschaft Hauptamt (VuWHA) and the Hauptamt Haushalt und Bauten ("main bureau [for] budget and construction", part of the Reich's Ministry of the Interior). He was also given an administrative government post of Ministerialdirektor in the ministry. Himmler stated that: "The supervision of the economic matters of [concentration camps] and their application to work is the responsibility of SS Gruppenfuehrer Pohl". The day before the Wannsee Conference, 19 January 1942, Himmler consolidated all of the offices for which Pohl was responsible into one, creating the SS Main Economic and Administrative Office (Wirtschafts- und Verwaltungshauptamt; WVHA). While already a significant figure in the regime, Pohl's appointment as chief of the WVHA strengthened his position. On 1 February 1942, Pohl was put in charge of all concentration camps, their construction, buildings, inmates and the economic benefits derived from their forced labor. On 20 April 1942, Pohl received his final promotion to SS-Obergruppenführer and General of the Waffen-SS. Behind Himmler and Reinhard Heydrich, he eventually became the third most powerful figure in the SS. Placing Pohl's position into perspective, historian Heinz Höhne wrote, "Four potent departments placed Pohl's hand firmly on the levers of power in the SS empire: he was in charge of the entire administration and supply of the Waffen-SS; he controlled the 20 concentration camps and 165 labor camps; he directed all SS and Police building projects; he was in charge of all SS economic enterprises."

As the head of the economics division of the SS, Pohl was appointed to run the Deutscher Wirtschaftsbetrieb (German Industrial Concern; GmbH), an organization he helped establish. It was designed to unify the massive business interests of Himmler's SS, taking in profits from the slave labour of concentration camp prisoners. Under Pohl's leadership, the WVHA turned its attention—once focused primarily on security and re-education—towards economic matters. To merge operations, Pohl announced the incorporation of the inspectorate of concentration camps into the WVHA on 13 March 1942. Expressing his sentiments regarding the use of prisoners for labor in a memo, Pohl wrote, "SS industries [Unternehmen] have the task ... to organize a more businesslike (more productive) execution of punishment and adjust it to the overall development of the Reich." Agreeing in general terms that many of the prisoners should be worked to death, Pohl paradoxically complained about the death of some 70,610 out of 136,870 new concentration camp inmates between June and November 1942, insisting that these deaths were impeding productive output at the camp's armament factories.

Expanding his power ever further over the economic realm, Pohl was named chairman of the board of directors for the Eastern Territories Industries Inc. (Ostindustrie GmbH) on 12 March 1943. Despite the seeming intention to use concentration camp prisoners for production in the expanding SS economics industry, Pohl's role was also framed by the ideological mandates of exploitation and racial extermination. For example, evidence indicates that Pohl refused to allow any increases in rations for starving prisoners toiling in the Granite Works of Gross-Rosen concentration camp, when there were administrative complaints in favor of providing more food to the inmates. According to historian Michael Thad Allen, "Pohl's men prided themselves as modern administrators" and often clashed with prison guards who "undermined productivity" by beating or killing prisoners. An irreconcilable duplicity emerged over the conflicting goals between the pragmatic economic interests of the SS under Pohl's purview and their fanatical racialist ideological imperatives. Fulfilling a call beyond mere economic interests but one based on communal concerns prompted Pohl's thinking when he informed the Reich's Interior Ministry in a letter that, "It is the will of the Reichsführer-SS that profits from lucrative corporations be diverted to cover the losses of others that must labor under the constraints of their non-capitalistic [nicht privatwirtschaftliche] end goals. At times these goals damn our corporations to years of future losses." In this manner, Pohl helped provide SS companies with their "ideological raison d’être." Along with other SS ideologues, Pohl wanted the SS to lead the Nazi revolution through the creation of an economic base that focused on communal industrial interests versus the despised principles of western style capitalism that served individuals; in the process he intended on employing concentration camp prisoners to serve the greater interests of the Reich. For Pohl, that also meant completely "exhausting forced labor."

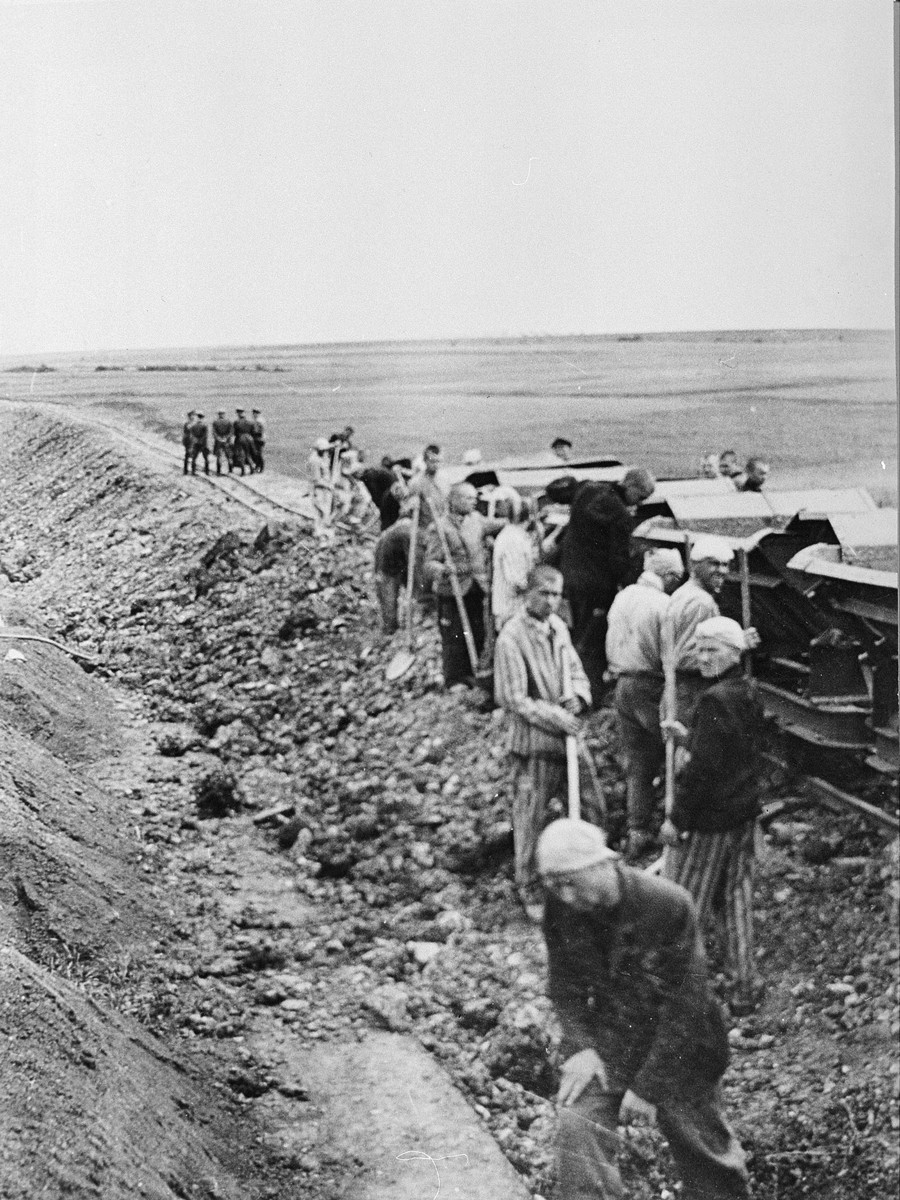
Buchenwald prisoners forced to work on the Buchenwald–Weimar rail line, 1943

Pohl oversaw the organization of the concentration camps, deciding on the distribution of detainees to the various camps and the "rental" of detainees for slave labour until 1944. The exploitation of the captives rested on the Nazi principle of "extermination through labor". Human material was to be efficiently and fully exploited in the process and as former Buchenwald political prisoner and historian Eugen Kogon points out, Pohl insisted on extracting the maximum financial worth from each and every camp laborer. Kogon asserts that Pohl even created evaluative tables that calculated their value as farmed-out wage earners (minus the depreciation of food and clothing), their profit intake from valuables (watches, clothing, money) remaining after their deaths (minus crematoria expenses), and any costs recovered from selling their bones and ashes; in total, the average concentration camp inmate had a life expectancy of nine months or less and was valued at 1,630 marks. Along these lines, Pohl supervised the macabre task of collecting Jewish people's gold fillings, hair, clothing, jewelry and other possessions. These "spoils", taken from the concentration camp inmates (mostly Jews) were carefully itemized and sold at prices set by the WVHA.

In keeping with Pohl's plan, concentration camps were to be constructed at Auschwitz, Lublin (Majdanek), and Stutthof to facilitate a "vertically integrated construction and building supply enterprise." (Note: In terms of the concentration camps, Pohl oversaw all of the major ones that were not solely focused on the Final Solution, which included "Dachau, Mauthausen, Sachsenhausen, Buchenwald, Majdanek, Stutthof, and Auschwitz".) The catalyst for the expansion of SS construction initiatives stemmed from Hitler's megalomania, namely, his plans to erect massive German cities and monuments (masterminded by architect Albert Speer) as the Reich expanded. Himmler was likewise inspired by these plans which would expand SS production and "boost the status of the SS". To accomplish the job of carrying out the Führer's vision, Pohl created the East German Building Supply Works (Ost-Deutsche Baustoffwerke GmbH; ODBS) along with the German Noble Furniture Corporation (Deutsche Edelmöbel GmbH) with the aid of Dr. Emil Meyer, an officer in the Allgemeine-SS and prominent figure within the Dresdner Bank.

Despite holding a "nominal" rank in the Waffen-SS, Pohl and the WVHA had "no direct connection" to the combat formations of the SS. Pohl nonetheless showed unwavering commitment to the cause and tenets of Nazism when performing his duties and stressed the importance in fulfilling the tasks outlined by Himmler. By those tasks he meant the policing duties related to the Reich's security, those concerning the concentration camp system and industry, those duties which promoted the Nazi world-view, and any undertaking related to the "Reinforcement of Germandom." Shortly before the invasion of the Soviet Union, Himmler wrote to Pohl about not needing to conceal any "hidden agendas" from him and emphasized the "essential" task of increasing "good and worthy" blood (Germans) through nutrition and SS settlements.

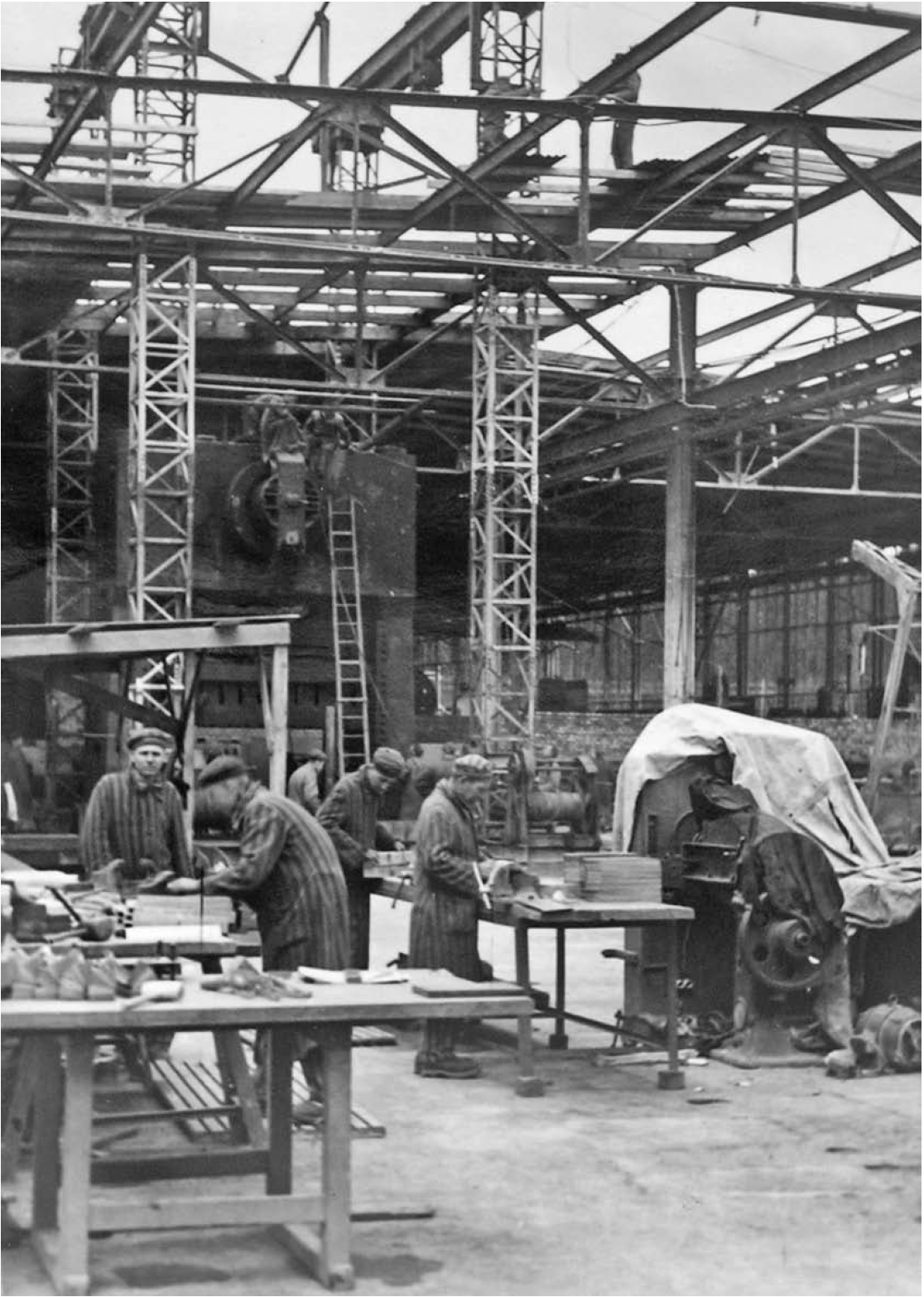
Concentration camp prisoners at Messerschmitt factory

During the spring of 1942, Hitler and other Nazi elites looked to increase armaments production through the use of concentration camp inmates. This coincided with Pohl's control over the concentration camp system. Grandiose building plans for new SS facilities in the East were laid aside in favor of arms production, which Pohl thought prudent and necessary. While Himmler and Pohl foresaw an enormous SS-operated armaments industry, they encountered opposition from the newly appointed armaments minister, Albert Speer, who undermined their initial projects. Aside from the moderately successful aircraft parts manufacturing operation at Flossenbürg concentration camp and Himmler's boasting in October 1943 of a "giant" SS-run system of armament works, "the SS had failed to become a serious arms manufacturer". Pohl worked in tandem with Speer for arms production, despite the latter's lack of faith in the SS industrial complex. Satellite camps which leased out concentration camp labor spread as a result of the collaboration between the industrialists and the SS, due in part to both Pohl and Speer's arrangements. Concentration camp inmates were not supposed to be leased-out on orders from Himmler, a directive Pohl ignored for he considered it impractical given the inability of the SS to establish production processes in short order. An enterprise overseen by Pohl and one Speer was keen on as well, was the construction works at Dora-Mittelbau, the underground complex where the V2 rockets were assembled. This enormous subterranean facility near Nordhausen in the Harz Mountains was completed in a mere two months using camp labor supplied by Pohl. Work on the prestigious wonder-weapon V1 and V2 projects remained bitterly contested between the SS and Speer's ministry.

By the summer of 1944, control of the concentration camps was removed from Pohl's WVHA and executive power was instead given over to local HSSPF offices, which, according to Pohl, occurred for operational reasons. Speer's armaments ministry took over arms production without the intermediation of the WVHA in the application process for industrial firms seeking business with the Reich. Estimates provided by Pohl indicate that during the second half of 1944, there were upwards of 250,000 slaves working for private firms, another 170,000 working in underground factories and an additional 15,000 clearing rubble from the Allied bombing raids.

== Trial, conviction and execution ==
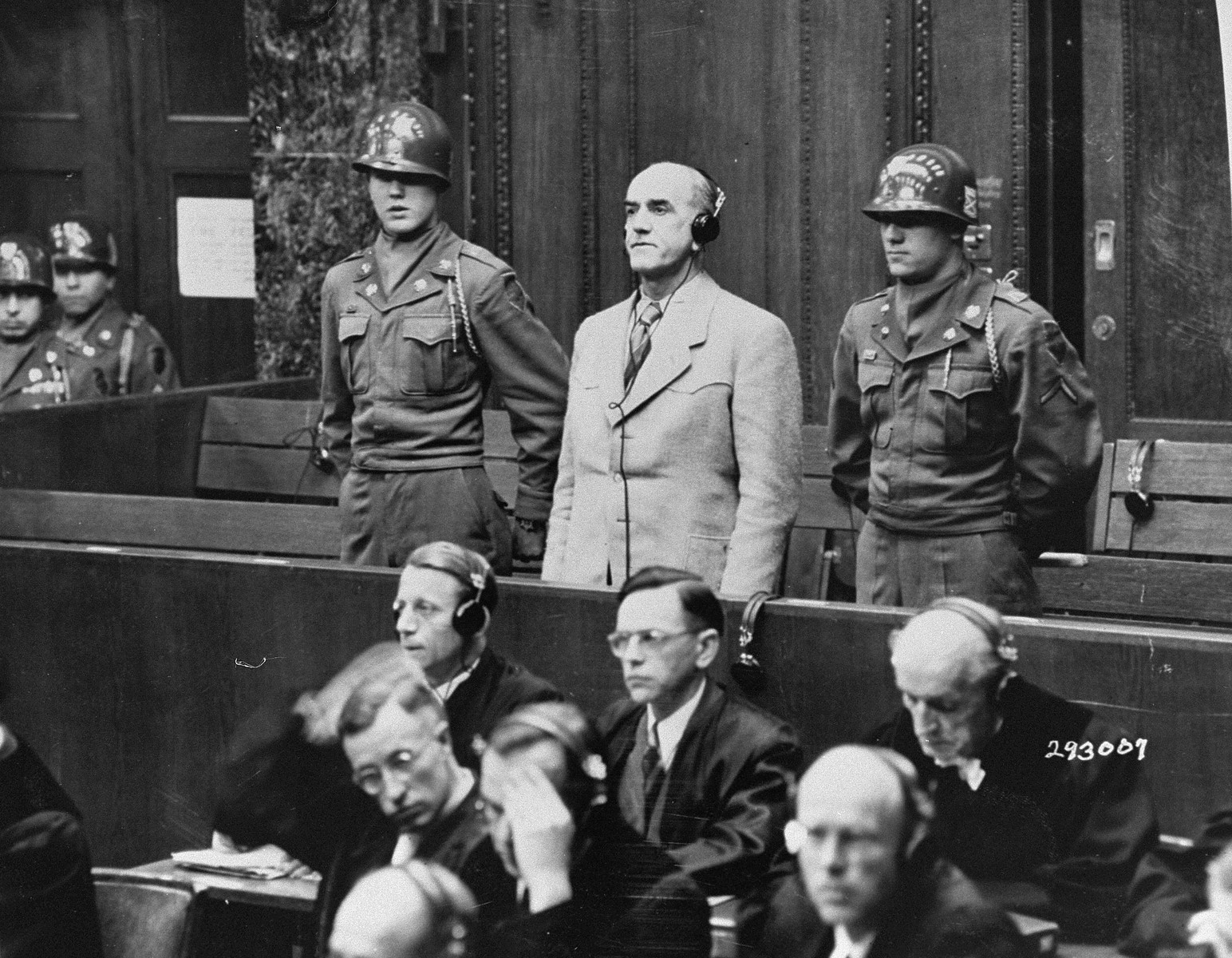
Oswald Pohl receives his sentence of death by hanging

After the end of World War II in 1945, Pohl first hid in Upper Bavaria, then near Bremen. Disguised as a farmhand, he was arrested by British troops in May 1946 and sentenced to death on 3 November 1947 by an American military tribunal in the eponymous Pohl Trial. Pohl was the chief defendant for the proceedings at the fourth Nuremberg trial; he and his co-conspirators were on trial for crimes committed in the concentration camps administered by the SS-WVHA while he was in charge. Without denying his knowledge of the mass killings of Jews, Pohl presented himself as a mere executive, accusing the prosecution of being guided by feelings of hatred and revenge. Pohl appealed his death sentence several times. During the Nuremberg trials, he started to see a Roman Catholic priest and recommitted himself to the Catholic faith. Officially, Pohl had never left the Catholic Church, although he stopped attending Mass in 1935. In 1950, his re-conversion resulted in the appearance of his book Credo. Mein Weg zu Gott ("Credo. My Way to God"), which was published with permission of the Catholic Church. Pohl was hanged shortly after midnight on 7 June 1951 at Landsberg Prison in Landsberg am Lech. (Note: Pohl's last words were "I have spent more than 30 years as a military man. I have always carried out orders and remained true to my oath of allegiance. I am ready.")

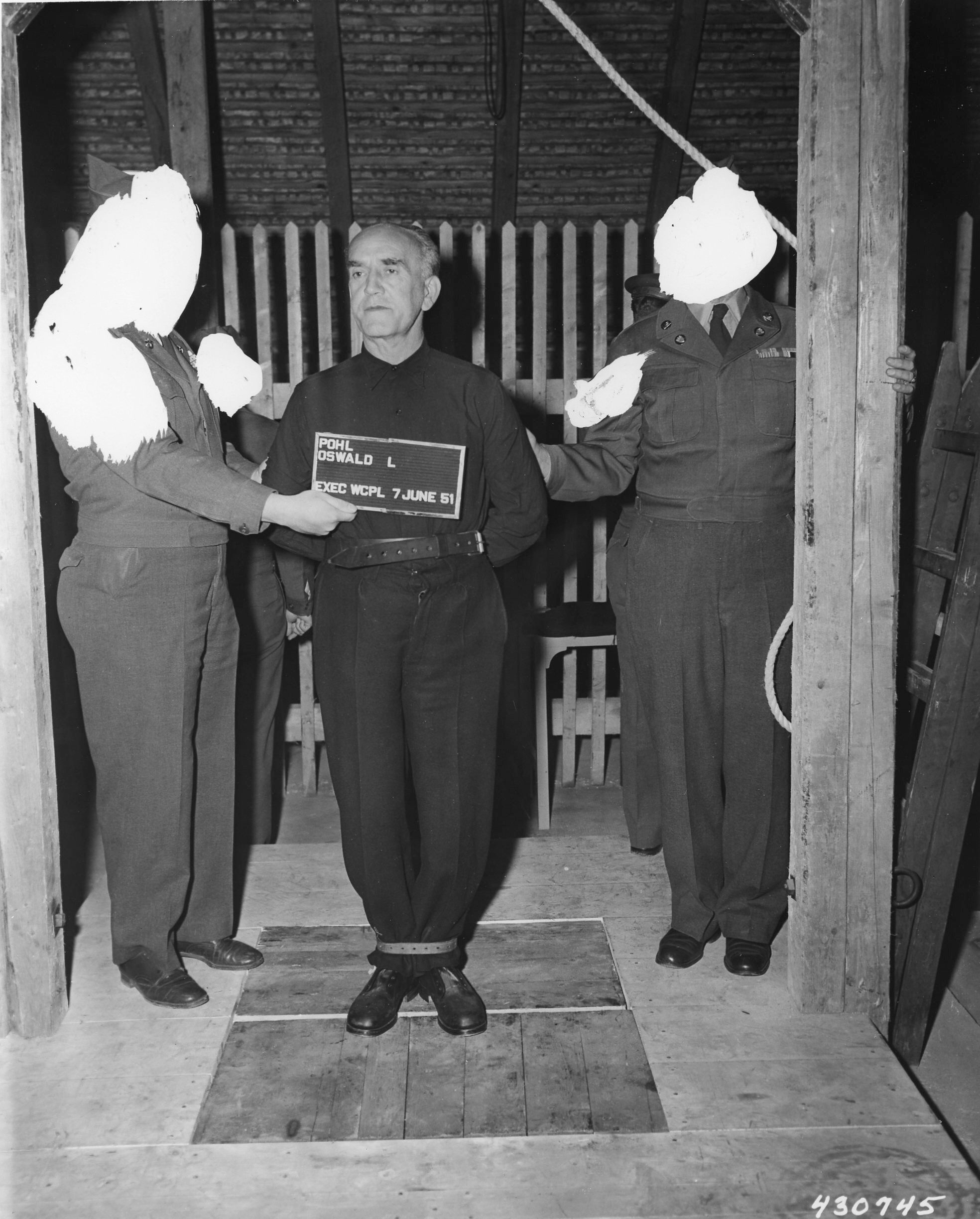
Pohl moments before his execution

== See also ==
- Deutsche Wirtschaftsbetriebe
- Ernst Lerch
- Forced labor in Nazi concentration camps
