= SS Main Economic and Administrative Office =

Nazi organization responsible for the finances of the Allgemeine-SS

- SS-Wirtschafts-Verwaltungshauptamt; SS-WVHA

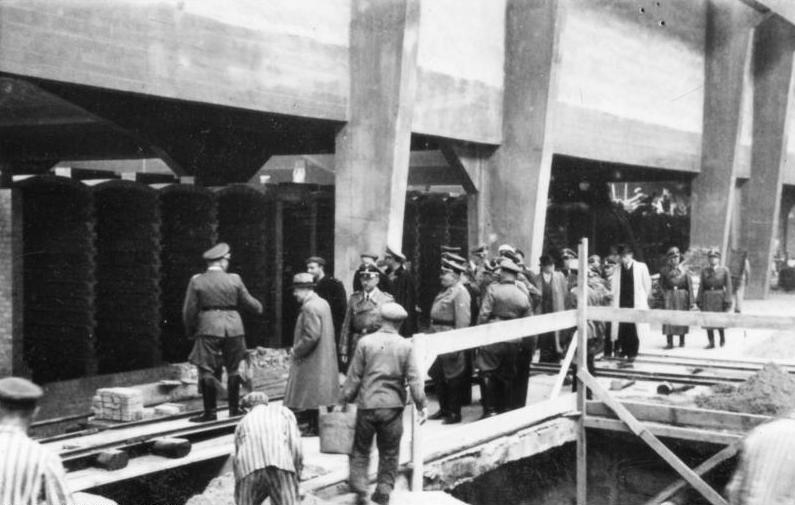
- Heinrich Himmler at an SS construction site, 1940.

SS-WVHA overview
- Formed: February 1, 1942
- Preceding agencies: Hauptamt Verwaltung und Wirtschaft; Hauptamt Haushalt und Bauten
- Dissolved: May 8, 1945
- Jurisdiction: German Reich (Nazi Germany) German-occupied Europe
- Headquarters: Unter den Eichen 125-135, Lichterfelde, Berlin; 52°27′5.12″N 13°18′35.24″E
- Minister responsible: Heinrich Himmler, (1933–1945)
- SS-WVHA executive: Oswald Pohl, Chief, SS-WVHA (1942–1945)
- Parent SS-WVHA: (Schutzstaffel) Allgemeine-SS

The SS Main Economic and Administrative Office (German: SS-Wirtschafts- und Verwaltungshauptamt; SS-WVHA) was a Nazi organization responsible for managing the finances, supply systems and business projects of the Allgemeine-SS (a main branch of the Schutzstaffel; SS). It also ran the concentration camps and was instrumental in the implementation of the Final Solution through such subsidiary offices as the Concentration Camps Inspectorate and SS camp guards.

== Economics of the Holocaust ==
In June 1939 SS-Obergruppenführer Oswald Pohl became chief of both the Verwaltung und Wirtschaft Hauptamt (VuWHA) and the Hauptamt Haushalt und Bauten ("main bureau [for] budget and construction", part of the Reich's Ministry of the Interior). He oversaw all SS "construction projects and building enterprises" through these offices. Pohl also worked with Walther Funk, Reich Minister of Economics (German: Reichswirtschaftsminister), to oversee financial aspects of the Final Solution, the most deadly phase of the Holocaust. Valuables such as gold watches, rings, even tooth fillings, glasses, and currency were taken from the inmates on arrival at the death camps. These items were then sent back to Berlin in WVHA-marked crates for processing at the Reichsbank, under its director Emil Puhl. (Note: Responding to the distribution of these valuables, one of Emil Puhl's colleagues warned him against visiting the camps and complained about dealing in "secondhand goods." Members of the Reichsbank collaborated with the Nazi Finance and Economics Ministries in maximizing the monetary exploitation of Jewish and foreign assets of every kind in the occupied territories.)

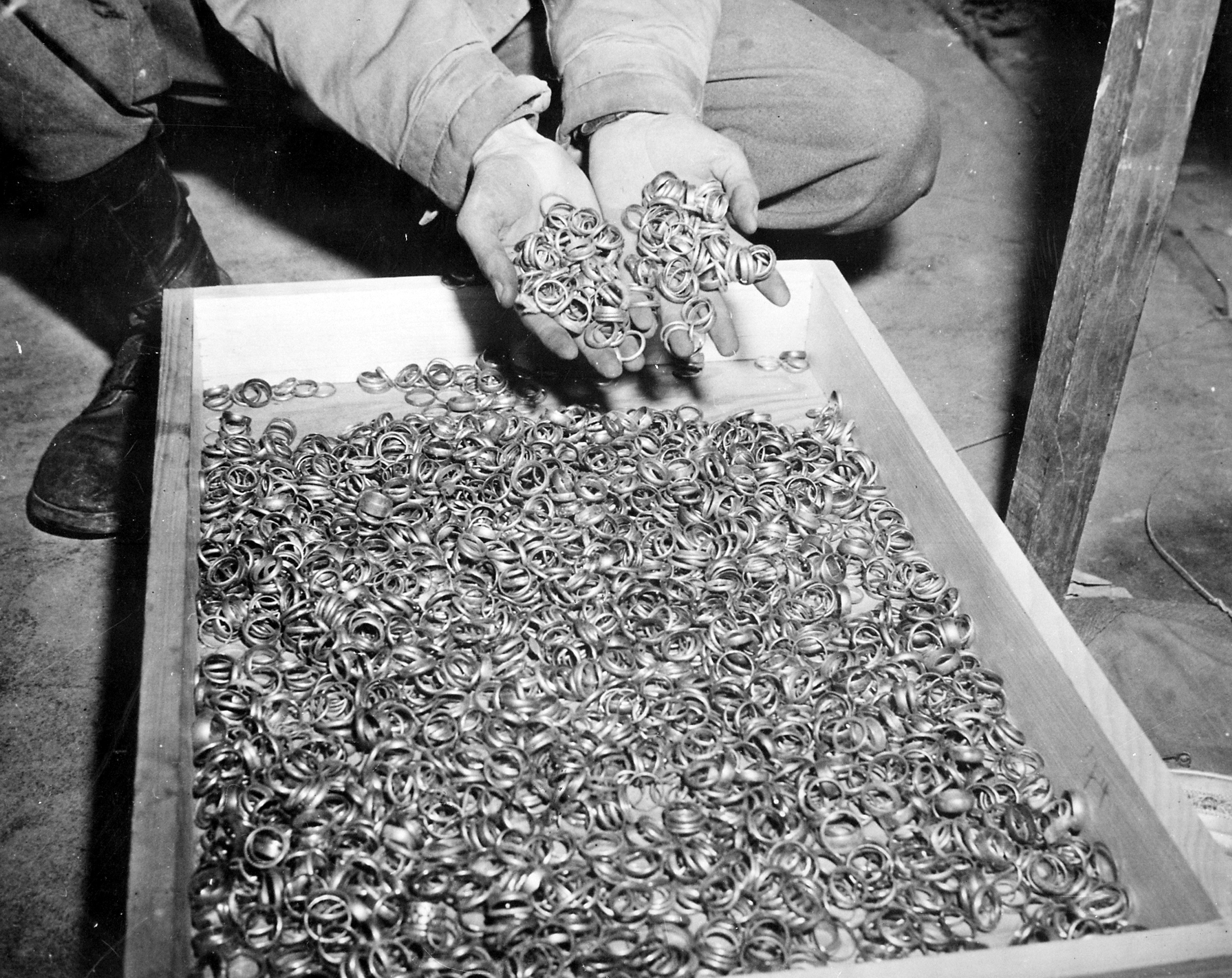
US troops, while liberating Buchenwald concentration camp in 1945, found thousands of wedding rings that had been stolen from victims of The Holocaust.

Pohl's administrative staff at the WVHA even created evaluative tables that calculated the value of concentration camp inmates as farmed-out wage earners (minus the depreciation of food and clothing), their profit intake from valuables remaining after their deaths (minus crematoria expenses), and any costs recovered from selling their bones and ashes; in total, the average concentration camp inmate had a life-expectancy of nine-months or less and was valued at 1,630 marks.

The Deutsche Wirtschaftsbetrieb (German Industrial Concern; GmbH) fell under the jurisdiction of the WVHA; it was designed to unify the massive business interests of Himmler's SS, taking in profits from the slave labour of concentration camp prisoners. Merging operations, the inspectorate of concentration camps was also incorporated into the WVHA on 13 March 1942. In 1942, the WVHA's main remit was to expand the SS's contribution to the war effort by using forced labor in armaments manufacture and construction projects. Slave labour at the camps was part of the effort to maximize economic utility. Expressing his sentiments regarding the use of prisoners for labour in a memo, Pohl wrote, "SS industries [Unternehmen] have the task...to organize a more businesslike (more productive) execution of punishment and adjust it to the overall development of the Reich." SS guards at the camps used murderous brutality to achieve higher quotas from forced labor in its punitive units. When it came to exploiting the working potential of the Jews, this eventually amounted to "annihilation through labour," according to historian David Cesarani. As a commodity of the WVHA, inmates were deliberately worked to death, even when it conflicted with production. This practice was a compromise between Nazi ideological imperatives and the practical needs of a militant Nazi state.

Concentration camps were constructed at Auschwitz, Lublin (Majdanek), and Stutthof to facilitate a "vertically integrated construction and building supply enterprise" under the administrative oversight of the WVHA. Expansion of the concentration camps and the satellite network was so rapid over such a vast area—with camps hastily opening and closing—that even the WVHA had a difficult time keeping count of them. The catalyst for the expansion of SS construction initiatives stemmed from Hitler's megalomania, namely, his plans to erect massive German cities and monuments (masterminded by the young architect Albert Speer) as the Reich subsumed more and more territory. Himmler was likewise inspired by these plans, which were designed to expand SS production and "boost the status of the SS". To accomplish the job of carrying out the Führer's vision, Pohl expanded the WVHA, creating the East German Building Supply Works (Ost-Deutsche Baustoffwerke GmbH; ODBS) along with the German Noble Furniture Corporation (Deutsche Edelmöbel GmbH) with the aide of Dr. Emil Meyer, an officer in the Allgemeine-SS and prominent figure within the Dresdner Bank.

Slave labor for private companies, included Heinkel and BMW, firms that produced aircraft and aircraft engines; the chemical giant, IG Farben, which manufactured rubber, synthetic fuels, synthetic explosives, pharmaceuticals, and one of its subsidiaries even produced Zyklon B; Junkers aircraft; Krupp steel; one of Germany's foremost aircraft manufacturers, Messerschmitt; the metal and tubing firm Salzgitter AG, which was part of Reichswerke Hermann Göring; the electrical engineering company, Siemens-Schuckertwerke; Apollinaris mineral water; Allach porcelain; and DEST (building material and armament), among others. To facilitate this integration, the number of slave laborers the WVHA had available increased steadily from 21,400 in 1939, to upwards of 524,286 by August 1944.

Another enterprise that fell under the purview of the WVHA—and one Albert Speer was keen on as well—was the construction works at Dora-Mittelbau, the underground complex where the V2 rockets were assembled. This enormous subterranean facility near Nordhausen in the Harz Mountains was completed in a mere two months using camp labor supplied by Pohl's WVHA. Work on the prestigious wonder-weapon V1 and V2 projects remained bitterly contested between the SS and Speer's ministry.

During the summer of 1944, control of the concentration camps was removed from Pohl's WVHA and executive power was instead given over to local HSSPF offices, which, according to Pohl, occurred for operational reasons. Speer's armaments ministry took over arms production without the intermediation of the WVHA in the application process for industrial firms seeking business with the Reich. Estimates provided by Pohl indicate that during the second half of 1944, there were upwards of 250,000 slaves working for private firms, another 170,000 working in underground factories and an additional 15,000 clearing rubble from the Allied bombing raids.

In 1947, a detailed description showing the scale of the operation was given at the WVHA trials at Nuremberg. Evidence outlined how property and cash worth hundreds of millions of Reichsmarks was taken from the victims of Aktion Reinhard. It was collected from the detailed notes that had passed between SS and Police Leader Odilo Globocnik and Reichsführer-SS Heinrich Himmler during the operation to kill most of the Jews in the General Government.

== Organization ==
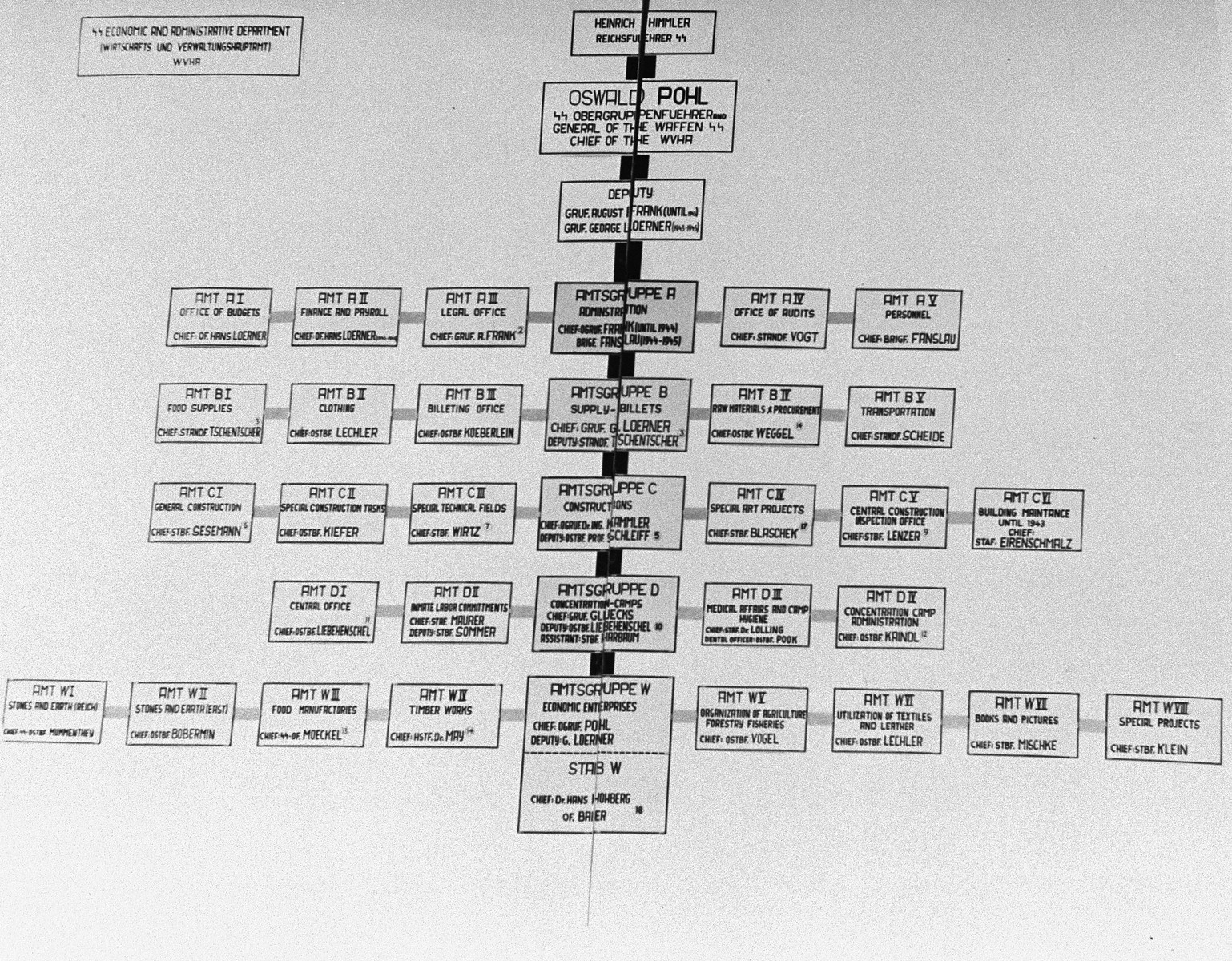
Structure of the WVHA, according to an exhibit presented at the WVHA trial

Organizationally, the WVHA was made up of five main departments (German: Ämter or Amtsgruppe):

- Amt A, Personnel—Finance, Law and Administration

Amtsgruppe A, among other things, discharged the responsibility for financial matters of the SS, including those relating to its concentration camps.

- Amt B, Payroll and Supply

Amtsgruppe B, among other things, was responsible for the supply of food and clothing for inmates of the concentration camps, and of food, uniforms, equipment, billets, and camp quarters for the members of the SS.

- Amt C, Buildings and Works

Amtsgruppe C, among other things was charged with the construction and maintenance of houses, buildings, and structures of the SS, the German police, and of the concentration camps and prisoner of war camps.

- Amt D, Concentration Camps

Amtsgruppe D, which prior to March 1942 was known as the Inspectorate of Concentration Camps, was responsible, among other things, for the administration of the concentration camps and of the concentration camp inmates.

- Amt W, Business—Economics

Amtsgruppe W, among other things, was responsible for the operation and maintenance of various industrial, manufacturing, and service enterprises throughout Germany and the occupied countries. It was also responsible for providing clothing for concentration camp inmates. In the operation of the enterprises under its control, this Amtsgruppe employed many concentration camp inmates.

The WVHA was also put in charge of numerous commercial ventures that the SS had been increasingly engaged in since the mid-1930s.

== SS commercial operations ==
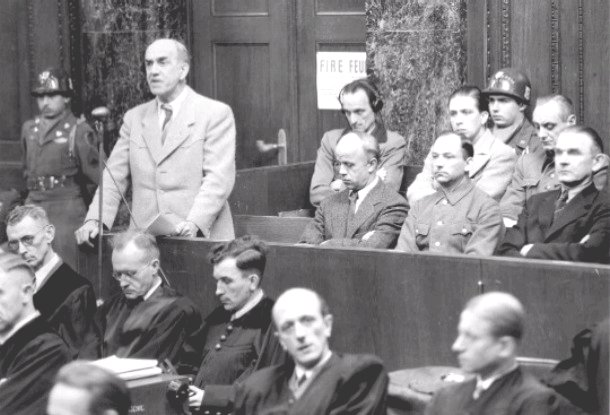
Oswald Pohl, former Chief of the SS Main Economic and Administrative Dept, standing, is indicted on war crimes charges in connection with the operation of concentration camps at the Nuremberg Trials in 1947. After making numerous appeals, he was executed in Landsberg Prison on June 7, 1951.

From the onset, many of the SS economic enterprises operated by the SS-WVHA were directly linked to the concentration camp system. Some of the commercial ventures and assets owned or operated by them included:

- Land and forests
- Brick factories
- Stone quarries
- Fine porcelain and pottery factories
- Building materials factories
- Cement factory
- Mineral water extraction and bottling
- Meat processing
- Bakeries
- Small arms manufacturing and repair
- Wooden furniture design and production
- Military clothing and accessories
- Herbal medicine
- Fish processing
- Publishing of books and magazines on Germanic culture and history
- Art acquisition and restoration

== Criminal entity within the SS ==
Since the WVHA fell under the administrative jurisdiction of the SS, it was deemed part and parcel to the legal indictments levied against the greater organization. This included the formal declaration of the Nuremberg Tribunal, which stated: "The SS was utilised for the purposes which were criminal under the Charter involving the persecution and extermination of the Jews, brutalities and killings in concentration camps, excesses in the administration of occupied territories, the administration of the slave labour programme and the mistreatment and murder of prisoners of war." To that end, the SS and its subordinated entities were officially recognized as a criminal organization in 1946.

== See also ==
- Pohl trial
- August Frank memorandum
