= Maximilian List =

German SS concentration camp commandant and architect (1910 – c. 1980)

Maximilian List (9 February 1910 – c. 1980) was an architect in Berlin who became an SS officer, involved in the operation of a number of Nazi concentration camps.

SS-Hauptsturmführer (Captain) List moved from the Neuengamme concentration camp to become the commandant of Lager Sylt, a labour camp on Alderney. He commanded SS-Baubrigade I, arriving on the island on 23 February 1943. The camp housed the foreign workers for the Organization Todt which was building fortifications on the island. List had a chalet built in the style of Adolf Hitler’s Berghof outside the camp perimeter, with an underground passage linking it with the camp. This building was later moved to another part of the island. List later took full control of another camp, Lager Norderney.

In June 1943, workers were being deported back to Neuengamme, probably to be exterminated, but fled, and a disciplinary enquiry against him took place in September 1943. To avoid a repeat of this, subsequently sick workers on Alderney were killed. List left the island in March 1944, replaced by SS-Obersturmführer Georg Braun.

After World War II a court-martial case was prepared against List, citing atrocities on Alderney. However, he did not stand trial, and is believed to have lived near Hamburg until his death around 1980.
