= List of subcamps of Neuengamme =

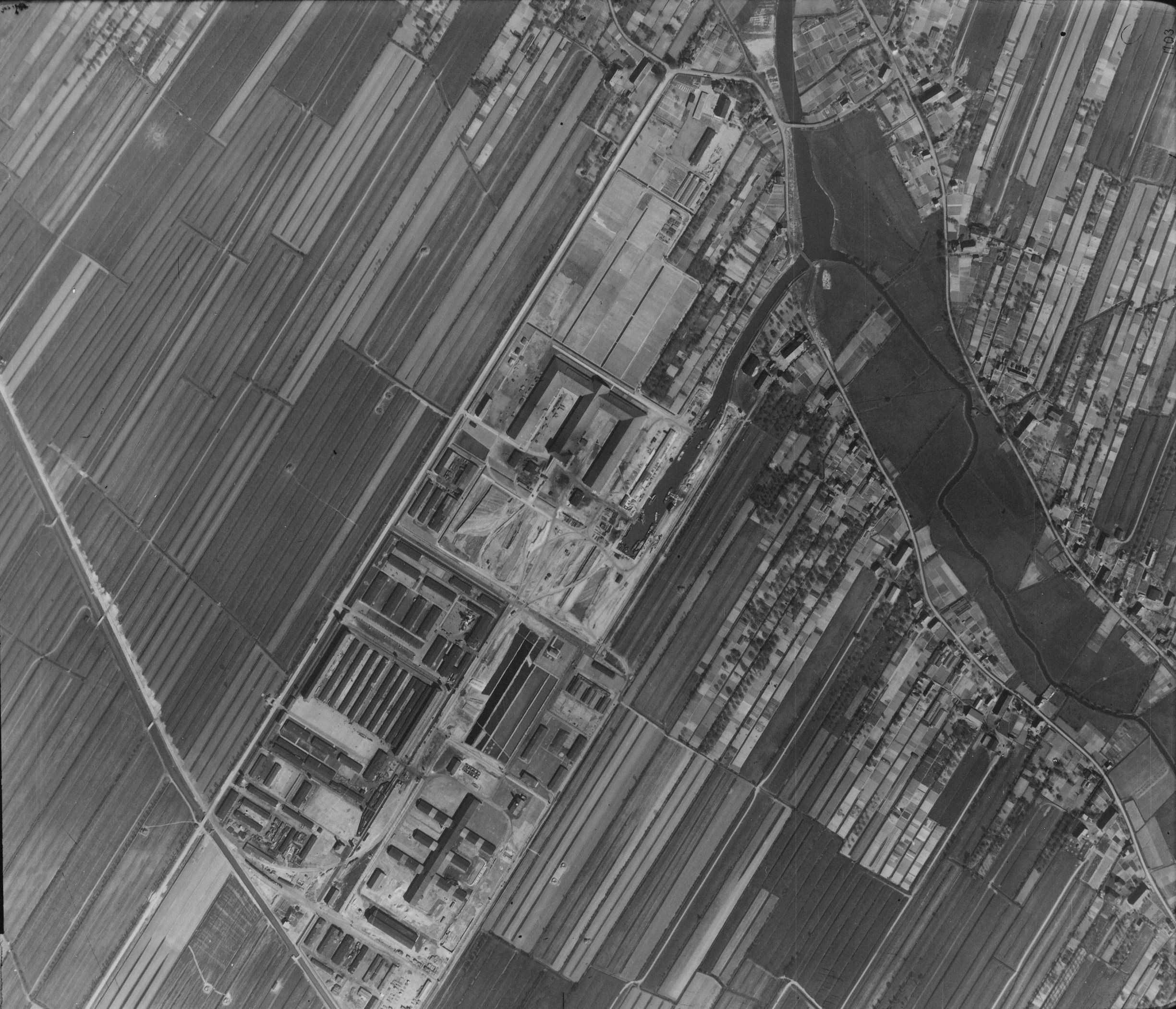
Image of Neuengamme camp taken by an RAF surveillance aircraft on 16 April 1945

Below is an incomplete list of SS subcamps of Neuengamme camp system operating from 1938 until 1945. The Neuengamme concentration camp established by the SS in Hamburg, Germany, became a massive Nazi concentration camp complex using prisoner forced labour for production purposes in World War II. Some 99 SS subcamps were part of the Neuengamme camp system, with up to 106,000 inmates. The number of prisoners per location ranged from more than 5,000 to only a dozen at a work site. Beginning in 1942, inmates of Neuengamme were also transported to the camp Arbeitsdorf. "Toward the ends of the war three times more prisoners were in satellite camps than in the main camp" wrote Dr. Garbe of the Neuengamme Memorial Museum. Several of the subcamps have memorials or plaques installed, but as of 2000, there was nothing at 28 locations.

The inmates were forced to work under grueling conditions in various locations across northern Germany; often transported between subcamps and specific job sites. Due to subsequent demolition of the Neuengamme camp system by the SS in 1945 including its records, the historical work is difficult and still incomplete. For example, in 1967, the German Federal Ministry of Justice suggested that the camp operated from 1 September 1938 until 5 May 1945 and became part of Sachsenhausen in June 1940. The Neuengamme Memorial organization (German: KZ-Gedenkstätte Neuengamme), an establishment of the Hamburg Ministry of Culture, Sports and Media, stated in 2008 that the empty camp was explored by British forces on 2 May 1945 and the last inmates were liberated in Flensburg on 10 May 1945. According to the United States Holocaust Memorial Museum, the camp was established on 13 December 1938 and liberated on 4 May 1945. Throughout World War II, millions of prisoners died in Nazi labour camps through mistreatment, disease, starvation and overwork, or were executed as unfit for labour. At Neuengamme, 1,700 people died each month in winter of 1944-1945, more than 50,000 in total.

== At the main camp ==
1. Canalize of the Dove Elbe, a branch of the Elbe river: Elbekommando
2. Klinkerwerk (brick factory) of the DEST
3. Lagergärtnerei (camp plant nursery)
4. Tongruben (clay cavities)
5. Manufacturing plant of the Walther-Werke
6. Armament factories of Messap and Jastram

== In Hamburg ==
Subcamps and working locations in Hamburg proper sorted by name.

| Camp Name | Location | Type | Dates of use | Est. prisoners | Est. deaths | No. |
|---|---|---|---|---|---|---|
| Blohm + Voss | Hamburg-Steinwerder | | 1 July 1944 – 21 April 1945 | | | 550 |
| Bullenhuser Damm | Hamburg-Rothenburgsort | Men, Children | 1 October 1944 – 21 April 1945 | 1,000 | >20 | 552 |
| Dessauer Ufer | Hamburg-Veddel | Men | – 22 April 1945 | | | 557 |
| Dessauer Ufer | Hamburg-Veddel | Women | 20 June 1944 – 30 September 1944 | | | 556 |
| Eidelstedt | | | 1 March 1944 – 1 May 1945 | | | 553 |
| Finkenwerder, Deutsche Werft | | | – 30 April 1945 | | | 554 |
| Fuhlsbüttel | Am Hasenberge 26 | Prison | 1 January 1943 – 8 May 1945 | | | 556 |
| Howaldtswerke, Hamburg | | | | | | 558 |
| Langenhorn | | | 12 September 1944 – 4 April 1945 | ca 750 | > 9 | 559 |
| Neugraben | | Women | 13 September 1944 – 8 February 1945 | 500 | | 560 |
| Poppenbüttel | | Working location for Sasel | | | | 1161 |
| Sasel | | Women | 1 August 1944 – 4 May 1945 | 500 | > 36 | 561 |
| Spaldingstraße | Hammerbrook | | October 1944 – 17 April 1945 | | | 562 |
| Stülckenwerft | Steinwerder | | – 15 April 1945 | | | 563 |
| Hamburg-Tiefstack | | Women | 8 February 1945 – 5 April 1945 | 500 | | 564 |
| Wandsbek | | | 2 May 1944 – 3 May 1945 | | | 565 |
| Wilhelmsburg; Jung-Ölindustrie | | | | | | 566 |

== Outside of Hamburg ==
Subcamps of Neuengamme in alphabetical order. Using the political division of Germany of the year 2000, there were at least 34 subcamps in Lower Saxony, 9 in Bremen, 9 in Schleswig-Holstein, 6 in North Rhine-Westphalia, 5 in Mecklenburg-Western Pomerania, 3 in Saxony-Anhalt, and 1 in Brandenburg. Also, four subcamps were located in Alderney, occupied Channel Islands, British Commonwealth.

| Camp Name | Location | Type | Dates of use | Est. # of prisoners | Est. # of deaths | Related subject | No. | Source |
|---|---|---|---|---|---|---|---|---|
| Alderney camps or Camp Alderney | See SS–Baubrigade I | Lager Norderney & Lager Sylt | Jan 1942 - Jun 1944 | 6,000 | 700 | | 6a | |
| Alt Garge; Alt-Garge a.d.Elbe | Near Bleckede | Later used as Alt-Garge UNRRA displaced persons camp, a camp for Latvian displaced persons | 24 August 1944 – 15 February 1945 | | | | 15 | |
| Aurich; District Aurich | | | 21 October 1944 – 23 December 1944 | 2,000 | 188 | | 51 | |
| Bad Sassendorf | SS–Eisenbahnbaubrigade 11 | | | | | | | |
| Barkhausen | a part of Porta Westfalica | | 18 March 1944 – 1 April 1945 | | | | 77 | |
| Blumenthal | See Bremen-Blumenthal | | | | | | 142 | |
| Boizenburg (District Hagenow, Bezirk Schwerin (old)) | | | – 30 April 1945 | | | | 150 | |
| Braunschweig, Camp Büssing-Schillstrasse | (Brunswiek) | Büssing–NAG | 17 August 1944 – 26 March 1945 | 800 | > 380 | | 165 | |
| Braunschweig, SS–Reitschule | Brunswiek, SS – Riding school | | | | | | 167 | |
| Braunschweig, Stahlwerke | Brunswiek; Steel factory | See Watenstedt | | | | | 168 | |
| Braunschweig, Truppenwirtschaft | Brunswiek; Military depot | | | | | | 169 | |
| Bremen-Blumenthal; Deschimag | | | 1 September 1944 – 20 April 1945 | | | | 176 | |
| Bremen, Behelfswohnbau | Temporary housebuilding | | – 26 April 1945 | | | | 175 | |
| Bremen, Borgwardwerke | Borgward factory | | – 12 October 1944 | | | | 176 | |
| Bremen, Deschimag, Camp Schützenhof | | | – 11 April 1945 | | | | 178 | |
| Bremen-Farge | | | 1 July 1943 – 8 April 1945 | | | | 179 | |
| Bremen-Neuenland | | | 16 Aug 1944 – 28 Nov 1944 | | | | 181 | |
| Bremen-Obernheide | | Women | 26 Sep 1944 – 4 Apr 1945 | 800 | | | 1085 | |
| Bremen-Osterort | | | 28 Nov 1944 – | 1,000 | | | 183 | |
| Bremen-Vegesack | | | – 30 Sep 1944 | | | | 184 | |
| Darß - Wieck | | | January 1941 – end-February 1941 | 50 | | | | |
| Darß - Zingst, Germany | | | | | | | | |
| Dalum; District Meppen | | Command from Meppen-Versen | – 25 March 1945 | | | | 260 | |
| Drütte; Municipality Watenstedt-Salzgitter | | | 1 September 1942 – 8 April 1945 | 3,100 | | | 316 | |
| Düssin / Mecklenburg | | Men / agricultural work | 15 September 1944 – 1 March 1945 | 80 | 1 | | 328 | |
| Eisleben; Command from Helmstedt-Beendorf | | Men | | | | | 346a | |
| Fallersleben; Women camp | | Volkswagen | Aug 1944 – 8 April 1945 | 650 | | | 387 | |
| Fallersleben-Laagberg (also Laagberg) | | Volkswagen | 31 May 1944 – 8 April 1945 | 800 | | | 794 | |
| Glasau; District Segeberg | | | 29 March 1945 – 2 May 1945 | | | | 466 | |
| Goslar | SS–Bauleitung Goslar | (Not Goslar subcamp to Buchenwald) | 20 October 1944 – 25 March 1945 | 15 | 1 | | 484 | |
| Gross-Hesepe; District Meppen | | Command from Meppen-Versen | – 25 March 1945 | | | | 504 | |
| Hannover-Ahlem | | | 30 November 1944 – 11 April 1945 | | | | 568 | |
| Hannover-Limmer | | | – 7 April 1945 | | | | 570 | |
| Hannover-Linden | (Mülhenberg-Hannover) | | – 7 April 1945 | | | | 571 | |
| Hannover-Misburg | | Men | 26 June 1944 – 7 April 1945 | 1,000 | | | 572 | |
| Hannover-Stöcken; Accumulatorenwerk | | | 19 July 1943 – 8 April 1945 | | | | 573 | |
| Hannover-Stöcken; Continental-Werke | | | 7 September 1944 – 30 November 1944 | | | | 574 | |
| Hausberge an der Porta | a part of Porta Westfalica | | 1 February 1945 – 1 April 1945 | | | | 585 | |
| Helmstedt–Beendorf | | women underground armaments industry | – 10 April 1945 | 2,500 | | | 596 | |
| Hildesheim | | | – 6 April 1945 | | | | 608 | |
| Hohwacht | See Lütjenburg | | | | | | | |
| Horneburg | | Philips-Valvo-Röhrenwerke | a) Mid-October 1944 – mid-February 1945 b) 24 February 1945 – 8 April 1945 – 31 March 1945 | a) 250 b) 300 | | | 636 | |
| Husum-Schwesing | | | 25 September 1944 – 22 December 1944 | | | | 643 | |
| Kaltenkirchen | | Building a "Fliegerhorst" (Military airport) | August 1944 – 17 April 1945 | 500 | > 214 | | 693 | |
| Kiel | | Clearing up work | July 1944 – September 1944 | 50 | | | 727 | |
| Ladelund | Near Flensburg | | 1 November 1944 – 16 December 1944 | 2,000 | > 301 | | 796 | |
| Langenhagen; Province Hanover | | | 2 October 1944 – 15 April 1945 | | | | 808 | |
| Lengerich; District Tecklenburg | | | – 1 April 1945 | 200 | > 7 | | 838 | |
| Lerbeck | a part of Porta Westfalica | | 1 October 1944 – 1 April 1945 | | | | 843 | |
| Lübberstedt; District Wesermünde | | Women | August 1944 – 30 April 1945 | 500 | | | 883 | |
| Lütjenburg | | Men | – 30 March 1945 | 197 | | | 893 | |
| Ludwigslust | See Wöbbelin | | | | | | | |
| Meppen-Versen | | | – 1 April 1945 | | | | 927 | |
| Misburg | See Hannover-Misburg | | | | | | 942 | |
| Mölln - Breitenfelde | | | 1 December 1944 – 30 April 1945 | 20 | | | 953 | |
| Neesen; District Minden | Working location for Porta Westfalica | | | | | | 1024 | |
| Neuhof | | | | | | | | |
| Neustadt in Holstein | | | December 1944 – 1 May 1945 | 15 | | | 1049 | |
| Nutzen | | | | | | | | |
| Porta Westfalica near Barkhausen-Lerbeck | See Barkhausen and see Lerbeck | | | | | | 1164 | |
| Salzgitter-Bad | | | 1 August 1943 – | 500 | | | 1278 | |
| Salzwedel; Province Saxony | | Women | 10 July 1944 – 15 April 1945 | 1,250 | | | 1282 | |
| Sandbostel | | | 15 April 1945 – | | | Stalag X-B | 1285 | |
| Schandelah; District Braunschweig | Now Cremlingen | | 8 May 1944 – 12 April 1945 | 800 | 200 | | 1292 | |
| Schwesing | See Husum-Schwesing | | | | | | | |
| Uelzen | | Men | End 1944 – 17 April 1945 | 500 | | | 1491 | |
| Vechelde, Braunschweig | | Command from Braunschweig, Camp Büssing-Schillstrasse | September 1944 – March/April 1945 | 400 | | | 1509 | |
| Verden | | | 8 October 1945 – April 1945 | 8 | | | 1515 | |
| Warberg; District Helmstedt | | (from Braunschweig, Truppenwirtschaft) | 5 June 1944 – 8 January 1945 | 8 | | | | |
| Watenstedt; Salzgitter Watenstedt Leinde | Stahlwerke Braunschweig; Hermann-Göring-Werke | Men | – 30 April 1945 (May 1944 – 7 April 1945) | 2,000 | | Salzgitter#History, 1300–1982 | 1540 | |
| Watenstedt; Watenstedt Leinde | Stahlwerke Braunschweig; Hermann-Göring-Werke | Women | 7 July 1944 – 30 April 1945 (– 7 April 1945) | 800 | | Salzgitter#History, 1300–1982 | 1540 | |
| Wedel (Women) | | | 13 September 1944 – 27 November 1944 | 500 | | | 1541 | |
| Wedel (Men) | | | 17 October 1944 – 20 November 1944 | 500 | > 27 | | 1541 | |
| Wilhelmshaven; Alten Banter Weg | | (Not SS–Baubrigade II) | 17 September 1944 – 5 April 1945 | 1,200 | 234 | | 1582 | |
| Wittenberge (Old: District Wittenberge) | | | 15 August 1942 (28 August 1942) – 17 February 1945 | 500 | 119 | | 1587 | |
| Wöbbelin; District Ludwigslust | | (Also referred to as Ludwigslust) | 12 February 1945 – 2 May 1945 | | | Wöbbelin concentration camp | 1591 | |
| Wolfsburg | See Fallersleben Arbeitsdorf (working village) | | | | | | 1595 | |

== Construction labor brigades ==
Inmates of concentration camps were centralized in construction labor brigades (German:Baubrigaden), organized by the SS, to clean up after air raids, remove unexploded ordnance devices and bombs, or recover corpses. Some of the brigades worked also at the Friesenwall—part of the Atlantic Wall at the German North Sea coast—and fortifications in German cities e.g. antitank obstacles. Other brigades were placing or repairing rails or railway stations.

| Brigade | Locations | | Dates of use | Est. prisoners | Est. deaths | Webpage |
|---|---|---|---|---|---|---|
| SS-Baubrigade I | Alderney | Building the Lager Sylt | 12 March 1943 – | 1,000 | 100 | |
| SS-Baubrigade II | Bremen | Clearing up after air raids | 12 October 1942 – 15 April 1944 | 750 | | |
| SS-Baubrigade II | Osnabrück | Clearing up after air raids | 17 October 1942 – May 1943 | 250 | 86 | |
| SS-Baubrigade II | Wilhelmshaven | Clearing up after air raids | Spring 1943 – November 1943 | 175 | | |
| SS-Baubrigade II | Hamburg-Hammerbrook | Clearing up after air raids | 7 August 1943 – April 1944 | 930 | | |
| SS-Baubrigade II | Lüneburg-Kaland | Digging anti-tank obstacles | 12 August 1943 – 13 November 1943 | 155 | | |
| SS-Eisenbahnbaubrigade 11 (Railway building unit) | Bad Sassendorf near Soest | Building rail tracks after air raids | 15 February 1945 – 4/5 April 1945 | | | |

== Further names ==
Names found in some lists, probably mistake in writing or double-listings:

| Name | | See | No. | Found |
|---|---|---|---|---|
| Altgarge; Altgarga | Probably mistake in writing | See Alt Garge | | |
| Arbeitsdorf | Autonomous concentration camp | Volkswagen | 29 | |
| Aumund | Probably double-listing | See Bremen-Vegesack | No ref | |
| SS-Baubrigade 1 SS-Baubrigade 2 | Probably double-listing: Roman number I = 1, II = 2 | See SS-Baubrigade I or II | | |
| Baubrigade V - West | | | No ref | |
| Barskamp | | | No ref | |
| Bergstedt | | | No ref | |
| Borkum | Probably meaning Lager Borkum | Nazi name for a camp on Alderney (see there) | | |
| Osterort | Probably double-listing | See Bremen-Osterort | | |
| Bremen-Weser | | | No ref | |
| Brink-Hannover | | | No ref | |
| Ebensee (subcamp to Mauthausen) | Some prisoners from SS-Eisenbahn-Baubrigade 11 were deported to | | 334 | |
| Engerhafe | Double-listing | See Aurich | | |
| Fidelstedt | Probably mistake in writing | See Hamburg-Eidelstedt | No ref | |
| Fliegerhorst | Translation for military airport | Probably Kaltenkirchen | No ref | |
| Fludwigslust | Probably mistake in writing probably double-listing | See Ludwigslust see: Wöbbelin | No ref | |
| Glassau bei Sarau | Probably mistake in writing | See Glasau | | |
| Gross-Fullen | (Village to Meppen) | | No ref | |
| Helgoland | Probably meaning Lager Helgoland | Nazi name for a camp on Alderney (see there) | | |
| Ibbenbüren | | | No ref | |
| Laasberg | Probably mistake in writing | See Fallersleben-Laagberg | No ref | |
| Norderney | Probably meaning Lager Norderney | Nazi name for a camp on Alderney (see there) | | |
| Minden | Maybe Neesen, district Minden | | No ref | |
| Ohldorf | Maybe Cemetery Ohlsdorf in Hamburg working location for SS-Baubrigade II | | No ref | |
| Peenemünde | or Karlshagen | Subcamp to Ravensbrück | 699 | |
| Schützenhof or Schützenhof-Bremen | | See Bremen, Deschimag, Camp Schützenhof | | |
| Sollstadt | | | | |
| Stöcken-Hannover | | See Hannover-Stöcken | 1409 | |
| Steinwerder | (Quarter of Hamburg) | 2 camps, see above | | |
| Stuklenwert | Probably mistake in writing | See Stülckenwerft in Hamburg | No ref | |
| Sylt | Probably meaning Lager Sylt | Nazi name for a camp on Alderney (see there) | | |
| Veerssen | Probably mistake in writing | See Meppen-Versen | | |
| Veleen | | | | |

== See also ==
- Nazi concentration camp list
- The Holocaust
