= Alderney camps =

Nazi prison camps in the Hartell Islands

Coordinates: 49°43′N 2°12′W

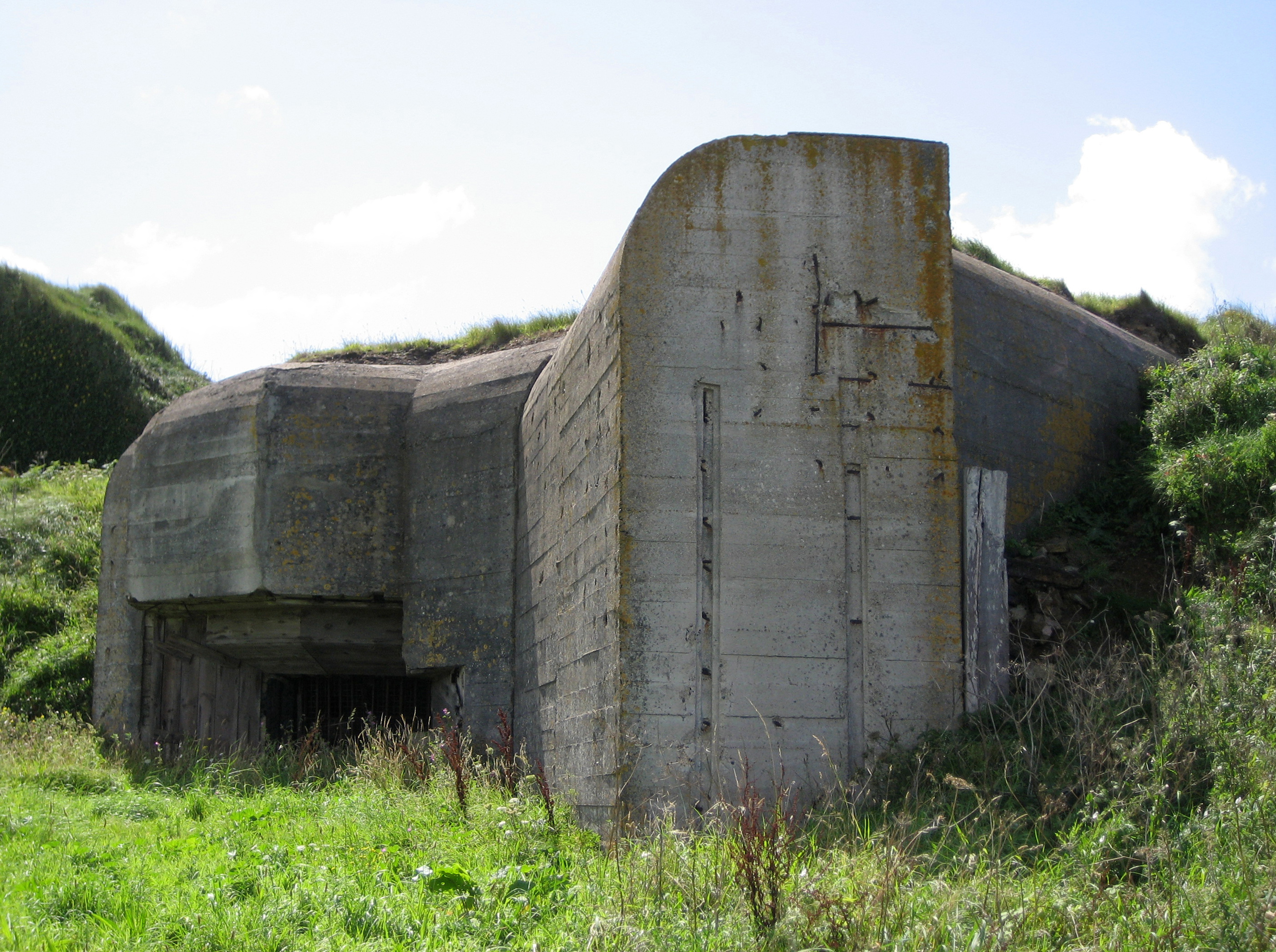
Only old bunkers and casemates such as this one remain.

The Alderney camps were camps built and operated by Nazi Germany on the island of Alderney during its World War II occupation of the Channel Islands. Alderney had four forced/slave labour sites, including Lager Sylt, the only Nazi concentration camp on British soil during the wartime occupation.

== Camps ==
In 1941 Nazi military engineers built four labour camps on Alderney. The Nazi Organisation Todt (OT) operated each subcamp and used forced labour to build fortifications in Alderney, including bunkers, gun emplacements, air raid shelters, tunnels and concrete fortifications. The camps commenced operation in January 1942. They were named after various islands in the North Sea: Borkum, Helgoland, Norderney and Sylt.

The four camps on the island had a total inmate population that fluctuated but is estimated at 6,000. The exact details are impossible to determine as many records were destroyed.

In 2022, studies indicated that as many as nine camps were built on Alderney.

=== Two work camps ===
The two work camps were:

- Lager Borkum
- Lager Helgoland

The Borkum and Helgoland camps were "volunteer" (Hilfswillige) labour camps and the labourers in those camps were treated harshly but better than the inmates at the Sylt and Norderney camps.

Borkum camp was used for German technicians and "volunteers" from different countries of Europe. Helgoland camp was used for Russian Organisation Todt workers.

=== Two concentration camps ===
The other two camps became concentration camps when they were handed over to be run by the SS from 1 March 1943; they became subcamps of the Neuengamme camp outside Hamburg:

- Lager Norderney
- Lager Sylt

The prisoners in Lager Sylt and Lager Norderney were slave labourers forced to build the many military fortifications and installations throughout Alderney. Sylt camp held Jewish enforced labourers.

Norderney camp housed European (mainly Eastern but including Spanish) and Russian enforced labourers. The Lager Sylt commandant, Karl Tietz, had a black French colonial as an under officer. Tietz was brought before a court-martial in April 1943 and sentenced to 18 months' penal servitude for the crime of selling on the black market after he sold cigarettes, watches, and valuables he had bought from Dutch OT workers.

In March 1943, Lager Norderney, containing Russian and Polish POWs, and Lager Sylt, holding Jews, were placed under the control of the SS, with SS Hauptsturmführer Maximilian List commanding.

== Deaths ==
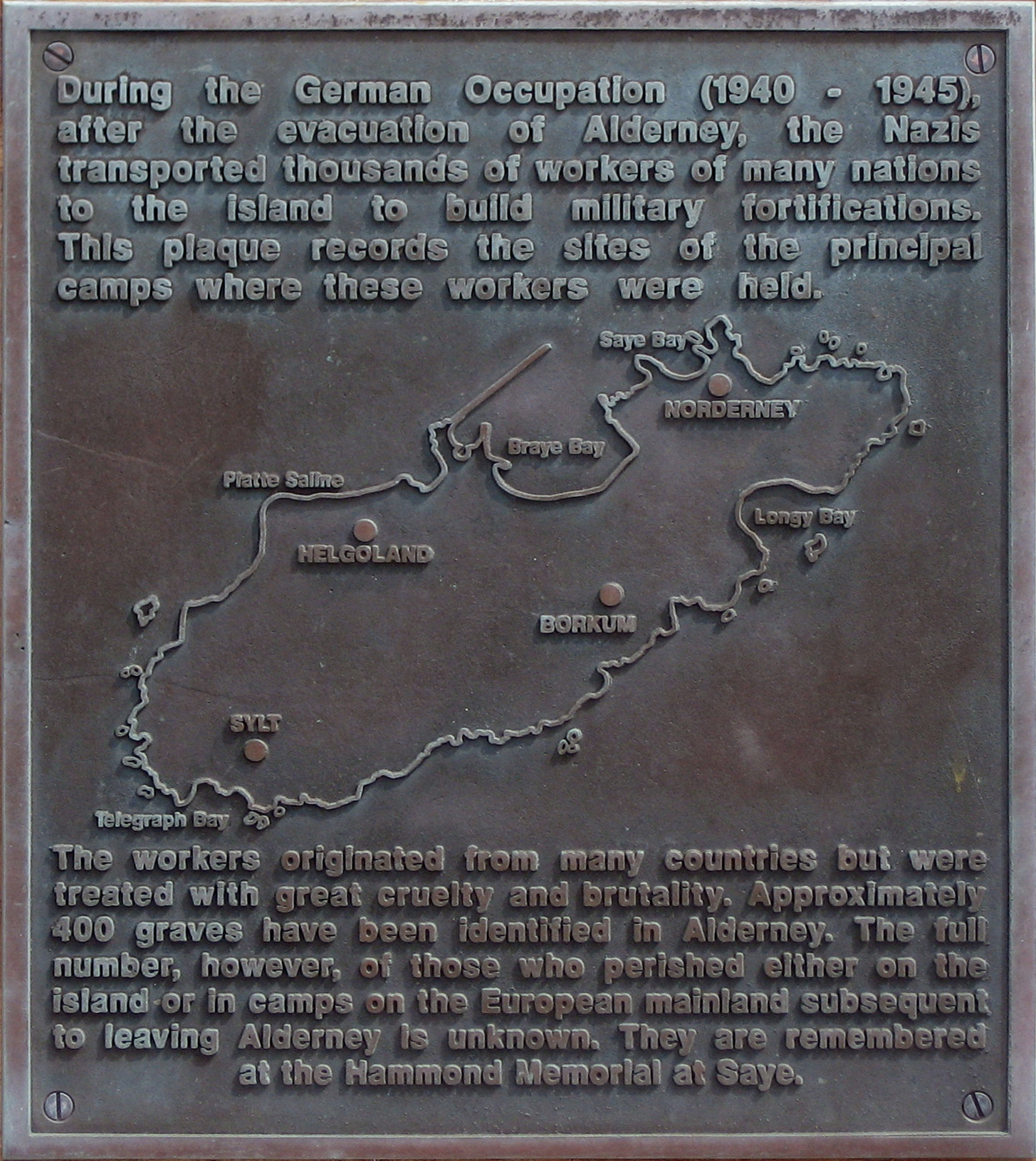
Alderney concentration camps memorial plaque

More than 700 camp inmates lost their lives before the camps were closed and the remaining inmates transferred to France in 1944.

There are 397 known graves in Alderney. Apart from malnutrition, accidents and ill treatment, there were losses on ships bringing OT workers to or taking them from Alderney. In January 1943 there was a big storm and two ships, the Xaver Dorsch and the Franks, anchored in Alderney harbour were blown ashore onto the beach, they contained about 1,000 Russian OT workers. Being kept locked in the holds for two weeks whilst the ships were salvaged resulted in a number of deaths.

On 4 July 1944 the Minotaure an ocean-going tug sailing from Alderney to St Malo with about 500 OT workers was hit three times by British torpedoes but somehow managed to stay afloat; some 250 died with the ship being towed into St Malo. Two of the escort vessels, V 208 R. Walther Darré and V 210 Hinrich Hey, were sunk. V 209 Dr. Rudolf Wahrendorff and the minesweeper M 4622 were damaged.

Documents from the ITS Archives in Germany show prisoners of numerous nationalities were incarcerated in Alderney, with many dying on the island. The causes of death included suicide, pneumonia, being shot, heart failure and explosions. Detailed death certificates were filled out and the deaths were reported to OT in St Malo.

== Post-war ==
After World War II, a court-martial case was prepared against former SS Hauptsturmführer Maximilian List, citing atrocities on Alderney. However, since the majority of those killed on Alderney were Soviets, the British government deferred to the Soviet Union in the matter of trials over the camps; in exchange, the Soviets handed over to the British the suspects in the Stalag Luft III murders. No war crimes trials were conducted over the Alderney killings, and List is believed to have lived near Hamburg until his death in the 1980s.

In 1949, an East German court convicted an SS man named Peter Bikar of crimes against humanity for the non-fatal abuse of prisoners in the Alderney camps. He was sentenced to five years in prison for beating multiple prisoners with the butt of his rifle.

Also in 1949, two former SS officials from the Norderney concentration camp on Alderney, SS Obersturmführer Adam Adler and Lagerführer Heinrich Evers, were prosecuted in France for crimes committed during their administration of the camp. Adler was sentenced to ten years, while Evers received a seven-year sentence. During the trial, former French inmates, including pianist Léon Kartun, Doctor Ivan Dreyfus, and lawyer Maurice Azoulay, testified about the harsh punishments and physical abuse they endured at the camp. The Association des Anciens Déportés d’Aurigny, a French organization of former Alderney inmates, publicly criticized these sentences as overly lenient, given the severity of the crimes committed. A 1945 British military report by investigator Captain Pantcheff documented that at least eight French nationals died in the Alderney camps, reflecting the brutal conditions endured by inmates.

The four German camps in Alderney have not been preserved or commemorated, aside from a small plaque at the former SS camp Lager Sylt. One camp is now a tourist camping site, while the gates to another form the entrance to the island's rubbish tip. The other two have been left to fall into ruin and become overgrown by brambles.

In 2017, military authors Colonel Richard Camp and John Weigold wrote in the Daily Mail that they believed between 40,000 and 70,000 slave workers had died at Alderney, and that Alderney had been turned into "a secret base to launch V1 missiles with chemical warheads on the South Coast." Their estimates of the deaths at Alderney were much greater than the largest estimates made by other historians, and caused consternation in Alderney. Trevor Davenport, the director of the Alderney museum, dismissed their estimates as "rubbish" and their claim of Alderney being turned into a secret base as "utter nonsense". Archaeologist Caroline Sturdy Colls of Staffordshire University said that there was "no evidence... to suggest that numbers in the tens of thousands of deaths are in any way credible whatsoever. There is no evidence to suggest that that many people were even sent to Alderney."

Gillian Carr, a Senior Lecturer at St Catharine's College, Cambridge, researched the German occupation of the Channel Islands and persecution of over 2,000 islanders from 1940 to 1945. Her findings were the subject of an exhibition titled: On British Soil: Victims of Nazi Persecution in the Channel Islands at the Wiener Library for the Study of the Holocaust and Genocide from October 2017 to February 2018. The exhibit is a permanent online exhibition at the library.

When a Staffordshire University team led by Sturdy Colls visited the island to investigate for a 2019 Smithsonian Channel documentary, entitled Adolf Island, the Alderney Government withdrew previously agreed permission for them to excavate the Lager Sylt site. There were also complaints from the Jewish community regarding the potential disturbance of remains. In 2022, Sturdy Colls said her investigations of the island gave her an estimate of between 701 and 986 deaths.

In summer 2023, Lord Eric Pickles, UK special envoy on post-Holocaust issues, ordered an inquiry into the atrocities committed in Alderney and assembled a panel of Holocaust experts to conduct it. The report was published in May 2024 and concluded that at least 7,608–7,812 people were sent to the camps, of whom almost 100 died before reaching Alderney, and "the number of deaths in Alderney is unlikely to have exceeded 1,134 people, with a more likely range of deaths being between 641 and 1,027".

== See also ==
- Fortifications of Alderney
- List of Nazi concentration camps
- List of concentration and internment camps
- Nazi concentration camps
- World War II
