= Neuengamme concentration camp =

Nazi concentration camp network in northern Germany

Neuengamme
- Nazi concentration camp
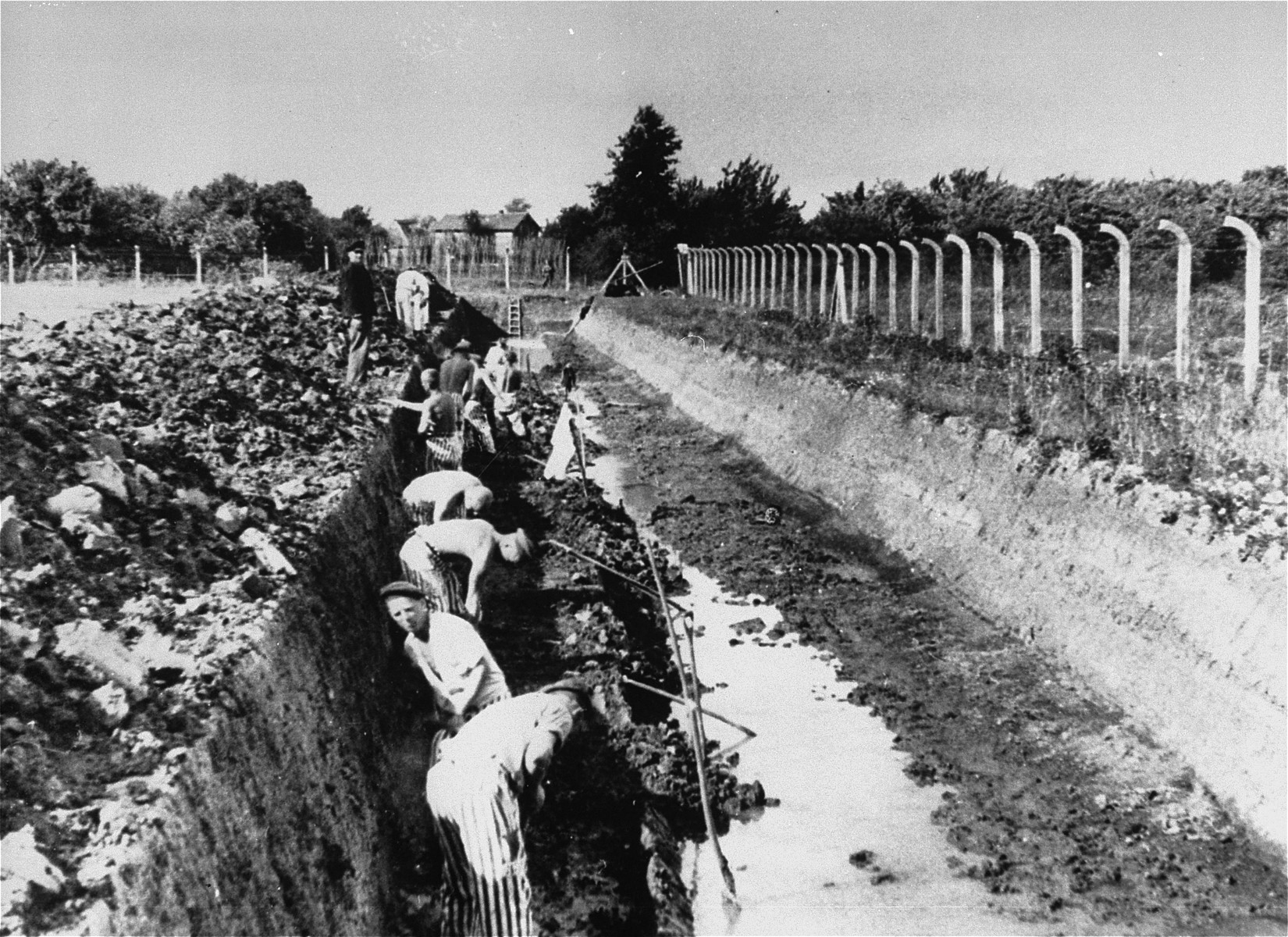
- Prisoners at forced labor along the camp fence

- Location of Neuengamme in Hamburg Neuengamme concentration camp (Germany)
- Location: Hamburg, Northern Germany
- Operated by: Schutzstaffel (SS)
- Commandant: Walter Eisfeld (February 1940 – March 1940); Martin Gottfried Weiss (April 1940 – August 1942); Max Pauly (September 1942 – 4 May 1945)
- Operational: 1938–1945
- Number of inmates: 106,000
- Killed: 42,900
- Liberated by: British Army
- Notable inmates: See Notable inmates
- Website: www.kz-gedenkstaette-neuengamme.de

Neuengamme was a network of Nazi concentration camps in northern Germany that consisted of the main camp, Neuengamme, and more than 85 satellite camps. Established in 1938 near the village of Neuengamme in the Bergedorf district of Hamburg, the Neuengamme camp became the largest concentration camp in Northwest Germany. Over 100,000 prisoners came through Neuengamme and its subcamps, 24 of which were for women. The verified death toll is 42,900: 14,000 in the main camp, 12,800 in the subcamps, and 16,100 in the death marches and bombings during the final weeks of World War II. Following Germany's defeat in 1945, the British Army used the site as an internment camp for SS and other Nazi officials. In 1948, the British transferred the land to the Free Hanseatic City of Hamburg, which summarily demolished the camp's wooden barracks and built in its stead a prison cell block, converting the former concentration camp site into two state prisons operated by the Hamburg authorities from 1950 to 2004. Following protests by various groups of survivors and allies, the site now serves as a memorial. It is situated 15 km southeast of the centre of Hamburg.

== History ==
=== Background ===
In 1937, Hitler declared five cities to be converted into Führer cities (German: Führerstädte) in the new Nazi regime, one of which was Hamburg. The banks of the Elbe river of Hamburg, considered Germany's "Gateway to the World" for its large port, were to be redone in the clinker brick style characteristic of German Brick Expressionism.

To supply the bricks, the SS-owned company Deutsche Erd-und Steinwerke (DEST) (English: German Earth & Stone Works) purchased a defunct brick factory (German: Klinkerwerk) and 500,000 m^{2} of land in Neuengamme in September 1938.

=== Neuengamme camp ===
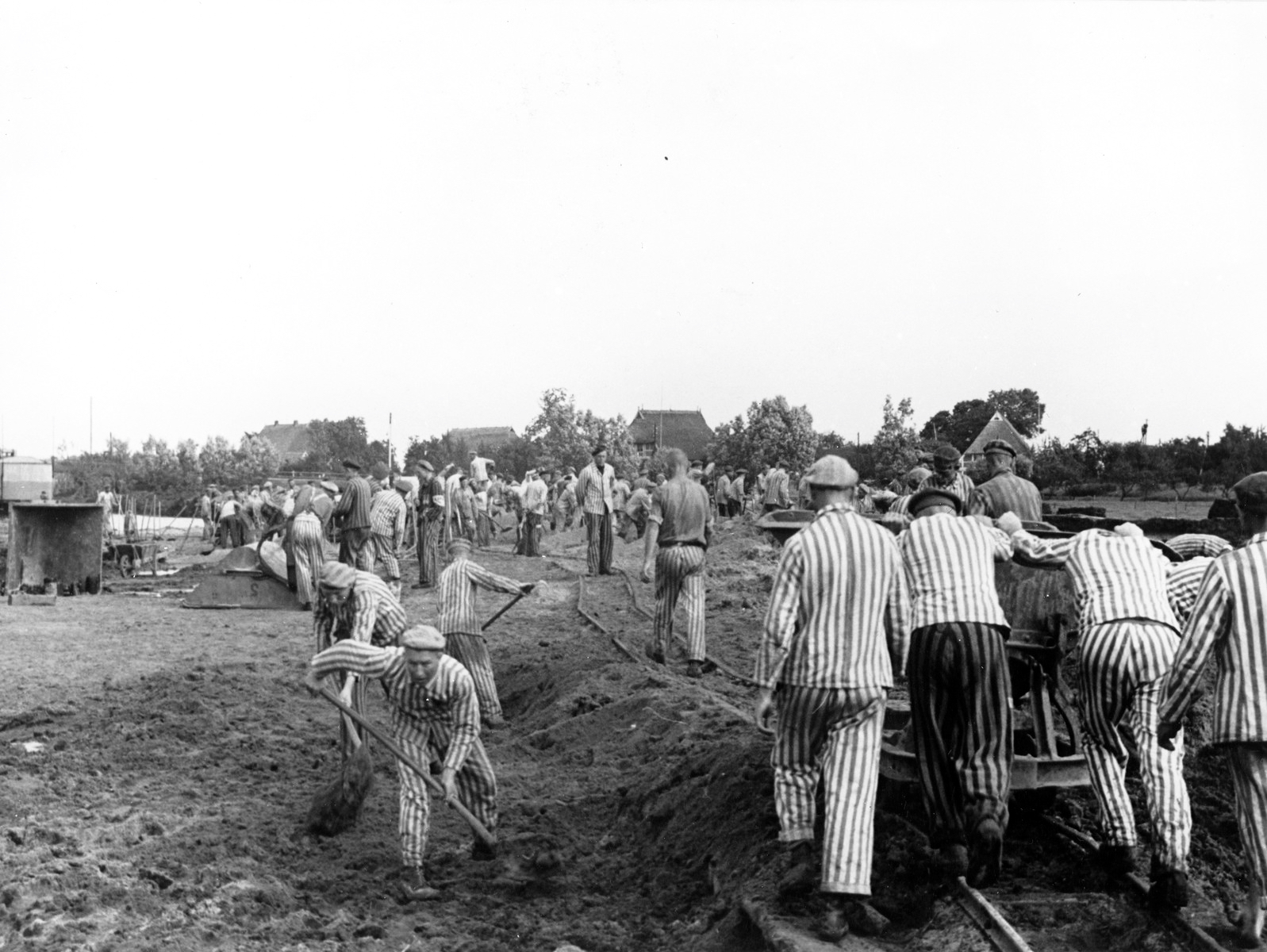
Neuengamme prisoners working on a canal of the Dove Elbe

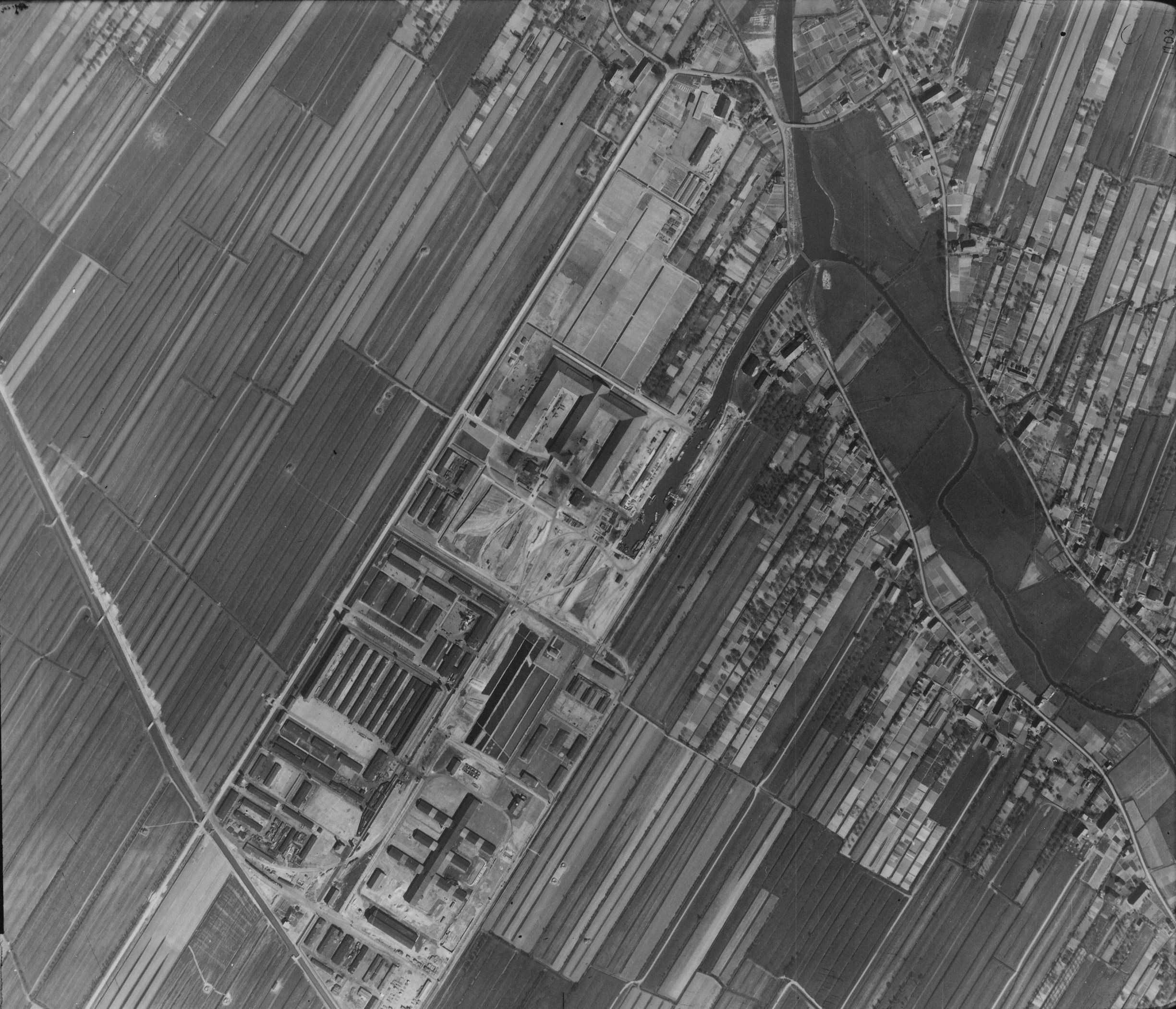
Aerial shot of the Neuengamme camp taken by British aviation on 16 April 1945

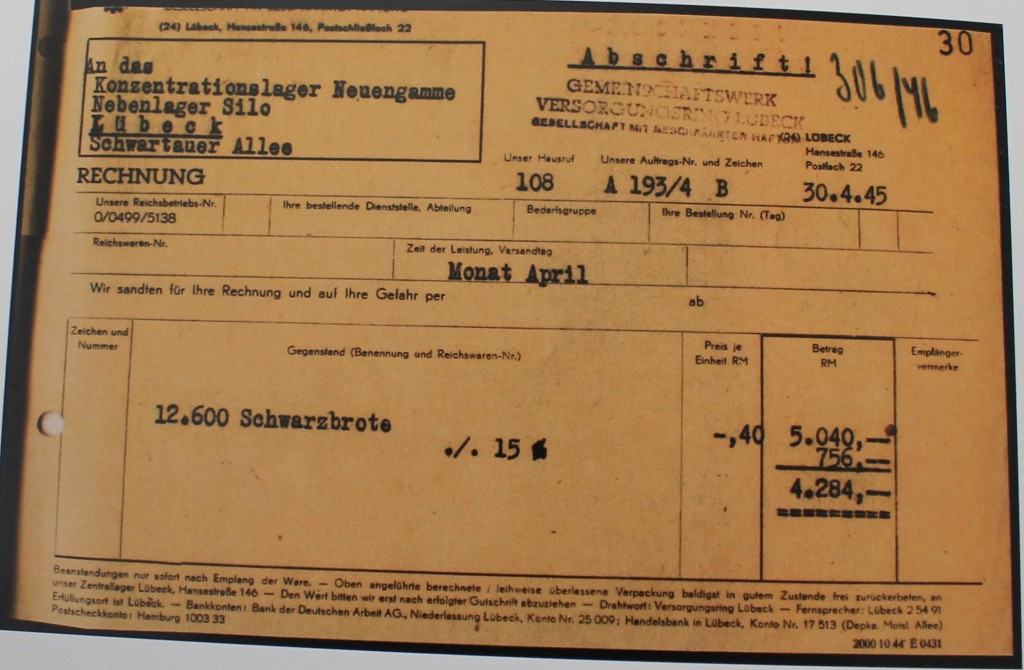
Invoice for bread for the month of April 1945 to the Neuengamme concentration camp

The SS established the Neuengamme concentration camp on 13 December 1938 as a subcamp (German: Außenlager) of the Sachsenhausen concentration camp and transported 100 prisoners from Sachsenhausen to begin constructing a camp and operate the brickworks.

In January 1940, Heinrich Himmler visited the site and deemed Neuengamme brick production below standard. In April 1940, the SS and the city of Hamburg signed a contract for the construction of a larger, more modern brick factory, an expanded connecting waterway, and a direct supply of bricks and prisoners for construction work in the city.

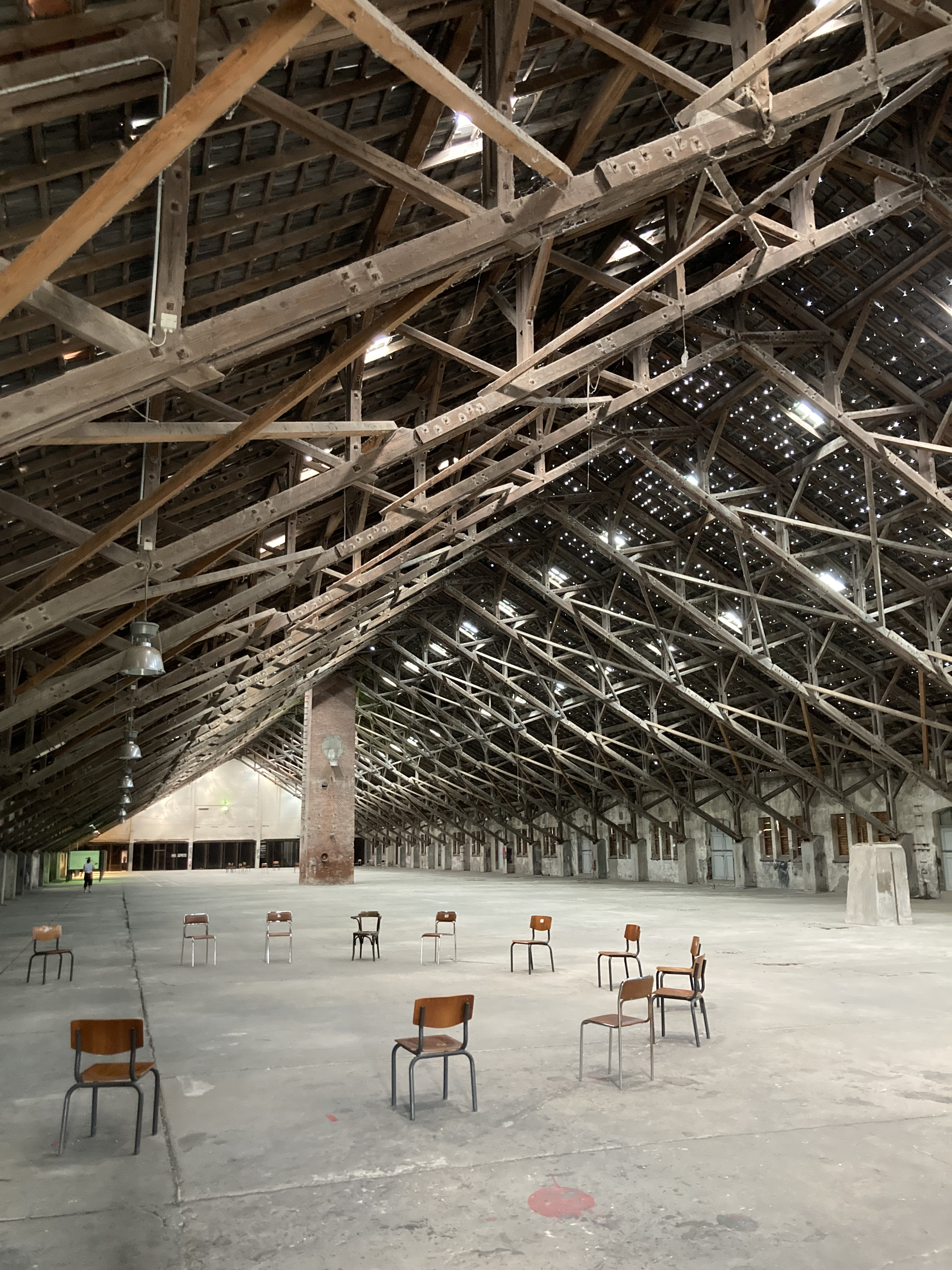
Neuengamme New Brick Factory

On 4 June, the Neuengamme concentration camp became an independent camp (German: Stammlager), and transports began to arrive from all over Germany and soon the rest of Europe.

As the death rate climbed between 1940 and 1942, a crematorium was constructed in the camp. In the same year, the civilian corporations Messap and Jastram opened armament plants on the camp site and used concentration camp prisoners as their workforces. After the war turned in Stalingrad, Nazis imprisoned millions of Soviets in the concentration camp system and Soviet POWs became the largest prisoner group in the Neuengamme camp and received brutal treatment by SS guards.

The first satellite camp of Drütte was established in Salzgitter, and in less than a year close to 80 subcamps were constructed.

By the end of 1942, the death rate had risen to 10% per month. In 1943, the satellite camp on the Channel Island of Alderney was established. In July 1944, a special section of the camp was set up for prominent French prisoners, comprising political opponents and resistors against the German occupation of France. These prisoners included John William, who had participated in the sabotaging and bombing of a military factory in Montluçon. William discovered his singing voice while cheering his fellow prisoners at Neuengamme and went on to a prominent career as a singer of popular and gospel music.

By the end of 1944, the total number of prisoners grew to approximately 49,000, with 12,000 in Neuengamme and 37,000 in the subcamps, including nearly 10,000 women in the various subcamps for women.

=== Evacuations, death marches, and the bombings of Cap Arcona ===
On 15 March 1945, the transfer of Scandinavian prisoners from other German camps to Neuengamme began, as part of the White Buses program. German prisoners in Belgium, whose liberation had begun, were transferred to Neuengamme. The last train, nicknamed the "ghost train", was sabotaged, at great risk, by its driver, and returned to occupied Brussels after reaching Muizen, taking 30 minutes for the 40 km journey—the outward journey, delayed by the driver and fireman—had taken ten hours. The prisoners were ultimately released following agreement between the German Military Administration and the International Red Cross.

Neuengamme's subcamps were emptied later that month on death marches to the reception camps of Bergen-Belsen and Osnabrück, and, on 8 April, an air raid on a prisoner train transport led to the Celle massacre. Orders were issued for the evacuation of the main camp on 19 April. Between 20 and 26 April, over 9000 prisoners were taken from Neuengamme and loaded on four ships: the passenger liners Deutschland and Cap Arcona, and two large steamers, SS Thielbek and Athen. The prisoners were in the ships' hold for several days with no food or water. Concluding that the ships contained Norway-bound fleeing Nazi officials rather than thousands of prisoners, the Royal Air Force (RAF) Hawker Typhoons bombed the Thielbek, Cap Arcona and Deutschland on May 3. Intelligence that the ships carried concentration camp prisoners did not reach the squadrons in time to halt the attack. Survivors who jumped into the water were strafed by cannon fire from the RAF aircraft or shot by Nazi officials. Thousands of dead washed ashore just as the British Army successfully occupied the area on land. The British forced German POWs and civilians to dig mass graves for the dead. Approximately 7,100 prisoners and officials died in the raid; only 450 prisoners survived. 600–700 concentration camp prisoners remained in the main camp under SS orders to destroy all incriminating documentation, dismantle many areas of the camp, and tidy the site. On 2 May 1945, the SS and the last of the prisoners left the Neuengamme concentration camp. The first British soldiers arrived the next day and, seeing a barren and clean site, reported the concentration camp as "empty".

=== After the war ===
In the first post-war months, the camp was used as a Soviet displaced persons camp, with German POWs held separately. In June, British forces began to use the site as an internment camp for witnesses, SS members and Nazi officials, called Civil Internment Camp No. 6.

The Civil Internment Camp No. 6 was closed on 13 August 1948, and the grounds were transferred to the Free and Hanseatic City of Hamburg, which then built and opened a prison on the site of the former prisoners’ bunkers in 1950. Several original buildings from the former camp were used for various purposes by the prisons until their closing in February 2006.

=== Displaced Persons Camp Neuengamme ===
In May 1945 the British military government began to construct DP Camps in Hamburg. Responsible for this was the unit "Displaced Persons Assembly Centre Staffs" (DPACS) which was supported by the United Nations Relief and Rehabilitation Administration (UNRRA). Displaced Persons received a special status under the British military government. It included people, who were in foreign countries because of the war and needed help returning home. This included former slave laborers and concentration camp inmates. On the site of former Concentration Camp Neuengamme about ten thousand Soviet slave laborers were housed. A different part of the site was used for German prisoners of war. Under the special requirement from the Soviet Union made in 1944 to take back all citizens, repatriation began on 9 May, only four days after the DP Camp was established. In general, the situation in the accommodations of DP's in Neuengamme is not well known. We only know from a war diary of the British 53rd (Welsh) Infantry Division about bad hygienic circumstances, which stemmed from the camp's time as a concentration camp. Men and women were separated, women were placed in former SS-guards accommodations. Survivors said even though food and clothing were hard to get, they felt treated well and enjoyed being free.

To get along with the difficulties of supply in the DP Camps, caused by the enormous number of survivors, on 27 May 1945 the British military government called on the citizens of Hamburg to donate clothes for men and women. Reactions were mixed, there were also acts of revenge. Because of these, some DPs were killed, the British military government imposed a curfew for several days.

In May 1945, the DP Assembly Centre "Zoo" was established in the Hamburg park "Planten un Blomen", for repatriations into the Soviet Union. In fact in 1950 six DP Camps still existed in Hamburg (Zoo, Funkturm, Radrennbahn, Alsterdorf, Fischbeck und Falkenberg) with 4,000 people. Because of the new administration under Hamburg's social authority the DPs were now labeled as "homeless foreigners".

=== War crimes trial ===
On 18 March 1946, the trial of fourteen officials of the main Neuengamme concentration camp began before a British military tribunal, at the Curiohaus building in Hamburg, Germany, the first of 33 trials that would be held over a period of the next two years brought by the British against staff of the camp and its satellites. Former prisoners from six countries testified during the trial regarding the executions committed in the camp, including those of Soviet POWs murdered with poisonous gas, "medical" experiments conducted on inmates, and the brutal treatment and appalling conditions of the prisoners in general.

The defendants were found guilty of war crimes on 3 May 1946; eleven were sentenced to death and the other three to prison terms ranging from 10 to 20 years. On 8 October 1946, the eleven men found guilty in the Neuengamme Trials were executed by hanging by the British executioner Albert Pierrepoint. These men were former commandant Max Pauly, SS Dr. Bruno Kitt, Anton Thumann, Johann Reese, Willy Warnke, SS Dr. Alfred Trzebinski, Heinrich Ruge, Wilhem Bahr, Andreas Brems, Wilhelm Dreimann, and Adolf Speck.

== Cap Arcona ==
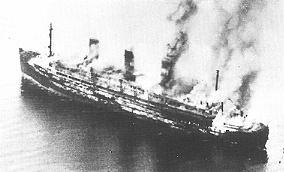
Cap Arcona burning shortly after RAF attacks in May 1945

The order to transfer the prisoners from the camps to the prison ships came from the Hamburg Gauleiter Karl Kaufmann who was acting on orders from Berlin. Although Kaufmann later claimed during the war crimes tribunal that the prisoners were destined for Sweden, the Higher SS and Police Leader of Hamburg, Georg-Henning Graf von Bassewitz-Behr, said at the same trial that the prisoners were scheduled to be killed in compliance with Himmler's orders. It has been suggested that the plan called for scuttling the ships with the prisoners still aboard.

== Camp operation ==
Hunger reigned supreme. The food given to prisoners was so terribly insufficient that most died within three months of arrival. The meager portions available were of poor quality and were often inedible. The most lethal disease in the camp was dysentery. Many prisoners attempted to acquire food illegally, and others managed to survive through food packages from relatives and the Red Cross. Only certain groups of prisoners, however, were even allowed to receive any mail from family or international organizations.

Life in the camp was a constant struggle for survival, down to the smallest of details. One of the few possessions the prisoners were allowed to have, their bowls, were rusty and could only be washed in cold water.

At the start of the building of the camp, prisoners slept on the floor of their crowded wooden barracks. In 1941, three-tier bunk beds were installed. From 1944, bunks were shared by two or three prisoners. The smell and overcrowding meant sleep was impossible after the 10–12-hour workday, and the bathrooms were always overcrowded in the mornings.

Prisoners clung to friendships and relationships in small groups. Intellectual activities as well as the rare opportunities for cultural activities like drawing, woodcarving, talking about literature, and reciting poetry or songs helped them maintain their will to survive.

=== Extermination through labour ===
The Neuengamme concentration camp was run under the SS practice of "extermination through labour" (German: Vernichtung durch Arbeit). Prisoners worked for 10–12 hours per day and were killed both due to the inhumane conditions in the camp as well as active violence from the guards. 42,900 prisoners died from difficult slave labour combined with insufficient nutrition, extremely unhygienic conditions contributing to widespread disease, and arbitrary brutal punishments from the guards. Although hospitals existed in the camp, medicine was scarce and entrance into the hospital was almost always a death sentence. In 1942, a typhus epidemic entreated the SS to allow former doctors imprisoned in the camp to work at the camp hospitals; prior to this reversal, the hospital staff comprised almost no former medical professionals. The hospitals were also used as a place to murder large groups of weakened Soviet prisoners via lethal injection.

Work at the main camp centered around brick production for the first half of the war. This included the construction of a canal on the small offshoot of the Elbe river located at the campsite to transport raw materials from Hamburg. Inmates were forced to excavate the heavy, peaty soil with inadequate tools, regardless of weather conditions or the state of their health. Once the prisoners finished building the new brick factory in 1942, one of the most populated assignments was working in the clay pit, extracting and transporting clay from the main camp for brick production. Constructing the canal, digging the clay, and transporting the soil were known as the three "death commandos". Skilled labour was almost always given to prisoners on upper rungs of the Aryan hierarchy.

From 1942 until the end of the war, armaments production became the central focus of Neuengamme, with private business ventures profiting financially from the free labour of the prisoners. Several armaments companies, including Messap, Jastram, Walter-Werke and the SS-owned Deutsche Ausrüstungswerke (DAW), established facilities inside the Neuengamme concentration camp following negotiations with the Nazi regime. Walther used their factory to manufacture Gewehr 43 semi-automatic rifles. While conditions for prisoners working in these privately owned factories were better than those working in other kommandos, all prisoners worked under the constant threat of being transferred to the death kommandos. According to the testimony of Wilhelm Bahr, an ex-medical orderly, during the trial against Bruno Tesch, 200 Russian prisoners of war were gassed by prussic acid in 1942. In April 1942, a crematorium was constructed at the camp. Prior to that all bodies were taken to Hamburg for cremation.

=== Known death rates and population numbers ===
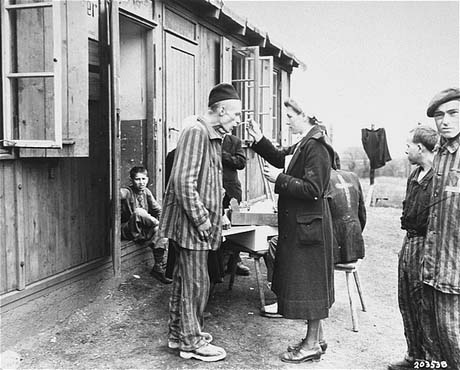
A sick Polish survivor in the Hannover-Ahlem subcamp receives medicine from the Red Cross, 11 April 1945

Because prisoners were forced to clear the site at the end of the war, only 10% of original documentation survives from the period. Despite this destruction, enough evidence has survived to allow scholars to conclusively prove exact numbers for some months of the entire 1938–1945 period. It is known exactly that by the end of 1940, 2,900 were imprisoned at Neuengamme and the known death toll was over 432. In 1941, the prisoners completed the barracks, and transports arrived from Auschwitz carrying 1002 prisoners as well as various other transports carrying 1,000 Soviet POWs. The total number of prisoners grew to 4,500. 495 known deaths occurred in 1941 alone.

Until the end of 1940, the majority of prisoners were of German nationality and contained a mix of Asocials, political opponents to the Nazi regime, and various other German national groups. After Neuengamme became an independent concentration camp, the prisoner population grew more diverse, and in the following years the Soviet group followed by the Polish prisoners made up the largest percentage of camp prisoners by nationality. Inmates were from 28 nationalities: Soviets (34,350), Polish (16,900), French (11,500), German (9,200), Dutch (6,950), Belgian (4,800), and Danish (4,800). The prisoner groups included those from the local Jewish community, communists, prostitutes, Gypsies, Jehovah's Witnesses, prisoners of war and many other persecuted groups. Of 106,000 inmates, almost half died. 23,394 victims of Neuengamme and the subcamps can be found listed by name in the Neuengamme Memorial Site's House of Remembrance. In reality, however, it is estimated that there were 26,800 victims of daily camp horrors and about 17,000 victims of the death marches and reception camps. At least 42,900 victims can be verified, even if not by name.

According to the testimony of Wilhelm Bahr, an ex-medical orderly, during the trial against Bruno Tesch, 197 Soviet prisoners of war were gassed by prussic acid (Zyklon B) in the arrest bunker of the camp on 25 September 1942. Four weeks later, 251 additional Soviet POWs were gassed in the bunker. There were also 20 Jewish children specifically brought to Neuengamme from Auschwitz to be experimented on by Dr. Kurt Heissmeyer from Berlin.

== Camp personnel and commandants ==
The SS commandant (German: Lagerführer) was in charge of the entire Neuengamme concentration camp network. There were only three commandants of Neuengamme, and over the years they were in charge of 4,500 SS men, with as many as 500 SS officers working at any given time.

As a subcamp of Sachsenhausen, the following men were commandants of Neuengamme:

- SS Sturmbannführer Walter Eisfeld
- SS Hauptsturmführer Martin Gottfried Weiß, April 1940 – June 1940

Erich Frommhagen (SS member from May 1933, ID No. 73754) became adjutant to the commandant of the Neuengamme camp in early 1940. He was killed in action on 17 March 1945.

As an independent concentration camp, the following were commandants of Neuengamme:

- SS Hauptsturmführer Martin Gottfried Weiß, June 1940 – September 1942. His adjutant was Karl-Friedrich Höcker.
- SS Obersturmbannführer Max Pauly, September 1942 – until liberation. His adjutant from May 1943 was Karl Totzauer.

The administration of Neuengamme was headed by SS-Sturmführer Alfons Bentele (September 1942 – March 1943). Alfred Trzebinski (1902–1946) was the SS-physician for the Neuengamme subcamps. Most SS officers had direct contact with the prisoners, and their harassment and mistreatment were daily markers of camp routine. In Neuengamme, there were three or four guard forces that would form a Sturmbann to guard the camp and the work details outside the camp. The prisoners’ barracks were surrounded by a barbed wire fence electrically charged at night.

No SS women were stationed at Neuengamme permanently. Female guards were trained at Neuengamme and assigned to its female subcamps. Many of these SS women are known by name, including Käthe Becker, Erna Dickmann, Johanna Freund, Angelika Grass, Kommandoführerin Loni Gutzeit (who was nicknamed "The Dragon of Wandsbek" by the prisoners while serving at Hamburg-Wandsbek), Gertrud Heise, Frieda Ignatowitz, Gertrud Möller, who also served at the Boizenburg subcamp, Lotte Johanna Radtke, Chief Wardress Annemie von der Huelst, and Inge Marga Marggot Weber. Many of the women were later dispersed to female subcamps throughout northern Germany. Today it is known that female guards staffed the subcamps of Neuengamme at Boizenburg, Braunschweig SS-Reitschule, Hamburg-Sasel, Hamburg-Wandsbek, Helmstedt-Beendorf, Langenhorn, Neugraben, Obernheide, Salzwedel, and Unterluss (Vuterluss). Only a few were tried for war crimes, and these include Anneliese Kohlmann, who served as one of six women-guards at Neugraben, and Gertrud Heise, Oberaufseherin at Obernheide.

== Subcamps ==
See also: List of subcamps of Neuengamme

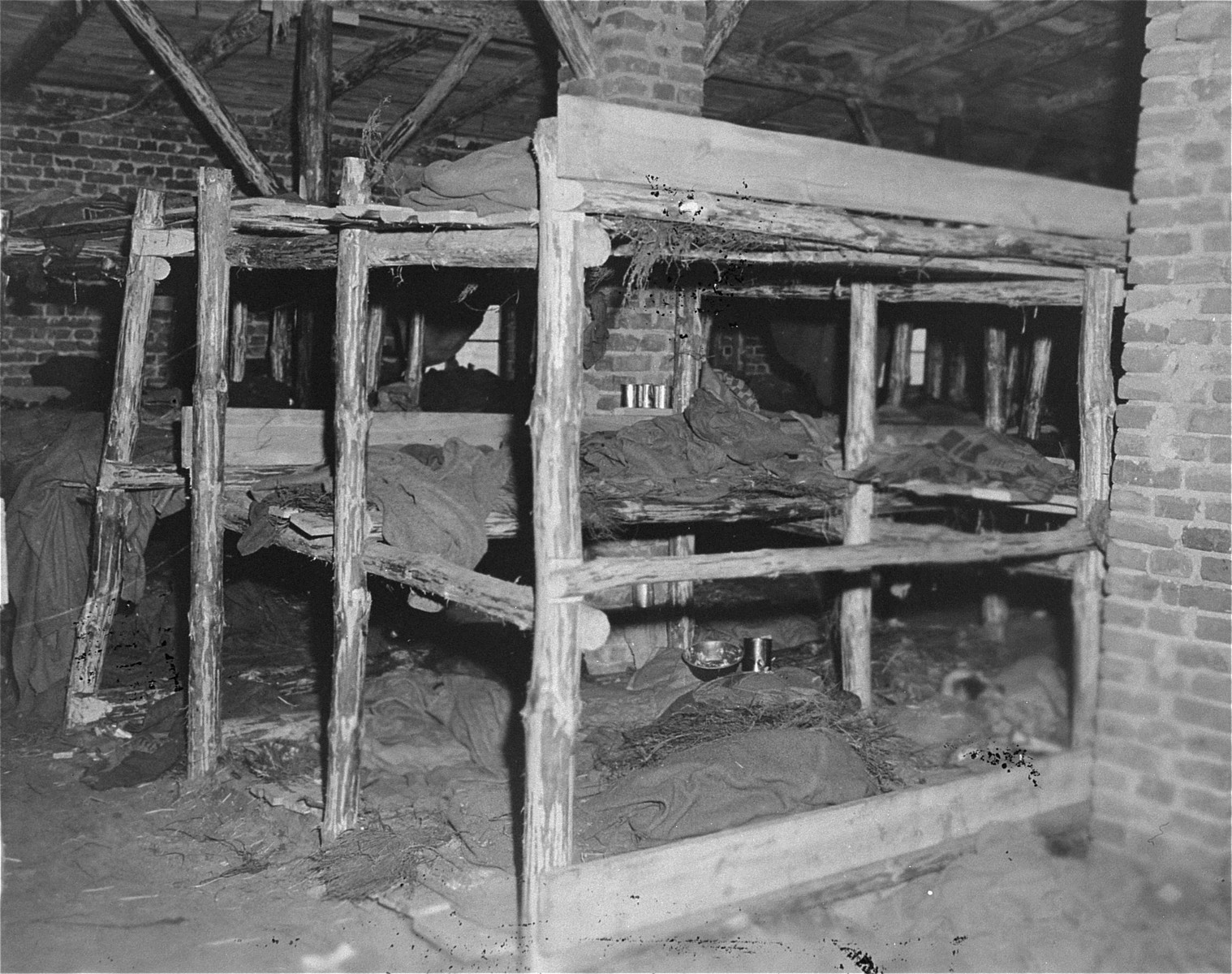
Sleeping quarters in the subcamp at Wöbbelin.

More than 80 subcamps were part of the Neuengamme concentration camp system. The first Neuengamme satellite opened in 1942, when inmates of Neuengamme were transported to the Arbeitsdorf subcamp. The number of prisoners within the subcamps drastically differed from camp to camp with as many as 3,000 inmates to as few as 10 or less.

Almost all women imprisoned at Neuengamme were interned in subcamps. In late 1943, most likely November, Neuengamme recorded its first female prisoners according to camp records. In the summer of 1944, Neuengamme received numerous transports of female prisoners from Auschwitz, as well other camps in the East. All of the women were eventually shipped out to one of its twenty-four female subcamps. Several of the former satellite camps have been converted into memorials or at least feature commemorative plaques on-site. In 2000, however, 28 locations still displayed nothing to indicate the past presence of a camp. Dr. Garbe, from the Neuengamme Concentration Camp Memorial, wrote, "The importance of the satellite camps is further highlighted by the fact that toward the ends of the war three times more prisoners were in satellite camps than in the main camp."

=== Neuengamme subcamps on Alderney Island ===
The Channel Islands were the only part of the British Commonwealth occupied by Nazi Germany. The Germans built four camps on the island of Alderney, two of which later became Neuengamme subcamps. The Alderney camps were named after the Frisian Islands: Lager Norderney, Lager Borkum, Lager Sylt and Lager Helgoland. The Nazi Organisation Todt (OT) operated all the subcamps, and used forced labourers to build bunkers, gun emplacements, air-raid shelters, and concrete fortifications. The Alderney camps had a total inmate population of about 6,000.

The prisoners in Lager Norderney and Lager Sylt were slave labourers forced to build the many military fortifications and installations throughout Alderney. Norderney housed slave labourers mostly from eastern Europe and a few from Russia and Spain. Sylt held Jewish forced labourers. Lager Borkum was used for German technicians and volunteers from different countries of Europe. Lager Helgoland was filled with Russian OT workers.

In March 1943, Lager Norderney with its Russian and Polish POWs and Lager Sylt and its Jews were placed under the control of the SS Hauptsturmführer (captain) Max List. Over 700 of the OT workers lost their lives on the island or while travelling to or from it in the one year under List's leadership. The camps were then closed and the remaining inmates transferred to Germany in 1944.

== Victims ==
Country	Men	Women	Total
Soviet Union	21,000	2,000	23,000
Poland	13,000	2,700	15,700
France	11,000	650	11,650
Germany	8,800	400	9,200
Netherlands	6,600	250	6,850
Belgium	3,500	150	3,650
Denmark	2,400	-	2,400
Hungary	1,400	5,800	7,200
Norway	2,800	-	2,800
Yugoslavia	1,000	250	1,250
Latvia	3,200	100	3,300
Czechoslovakia	800	800	1,600
Greece	1,200	-	1,200
Italy	1,100	100	1,200
Spain	750	-	750
Austria	300	-	300
Luxembourg	50	-	50
Other countries	2,100	300	2,400
Dead in deportation			55,000
not officially on the lists	-	-	5,900
Overall	81,000	13,600	100,400

== Memorial ==
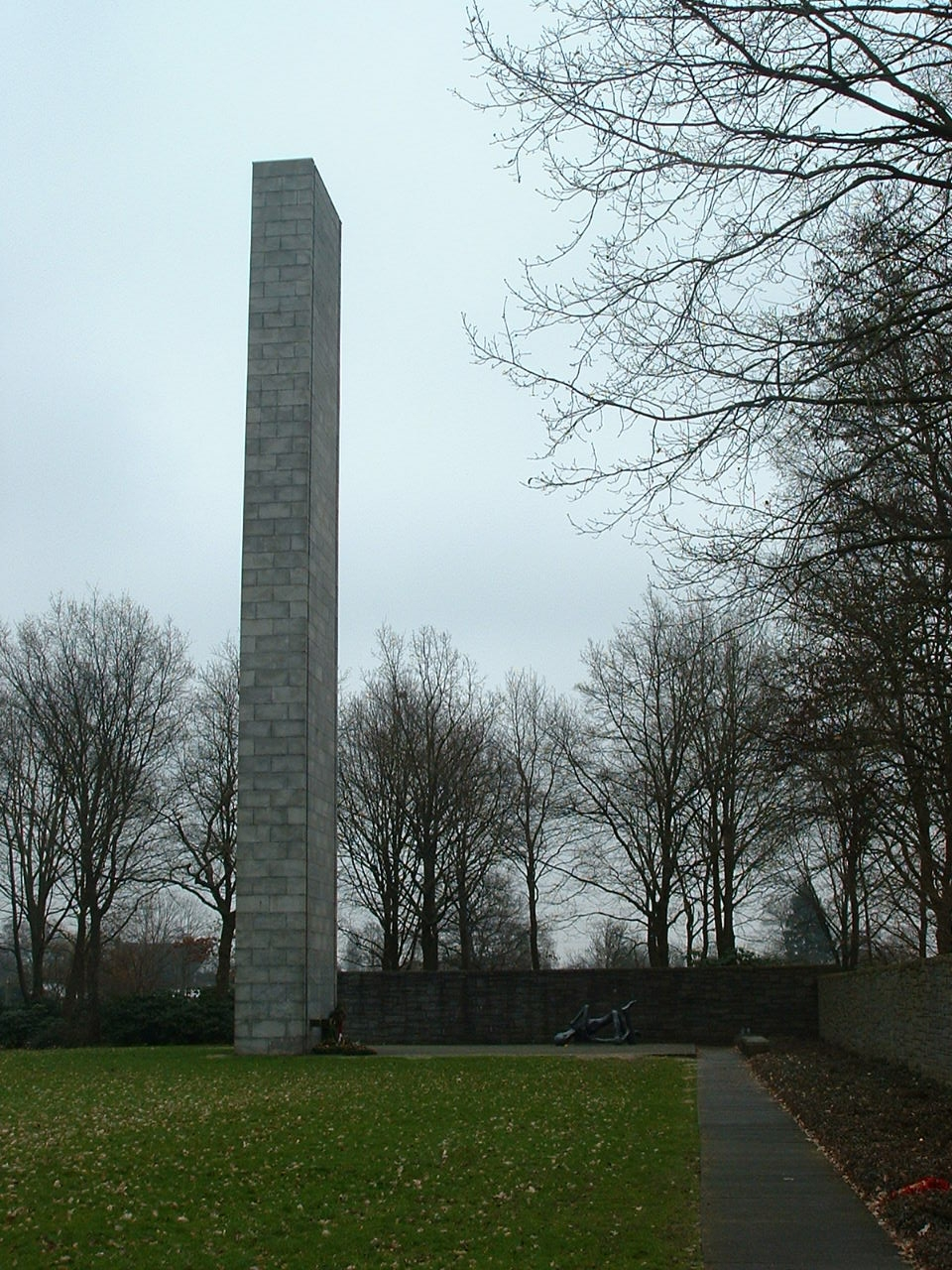
The memorial tower at the former concentration camp Neuengamme.

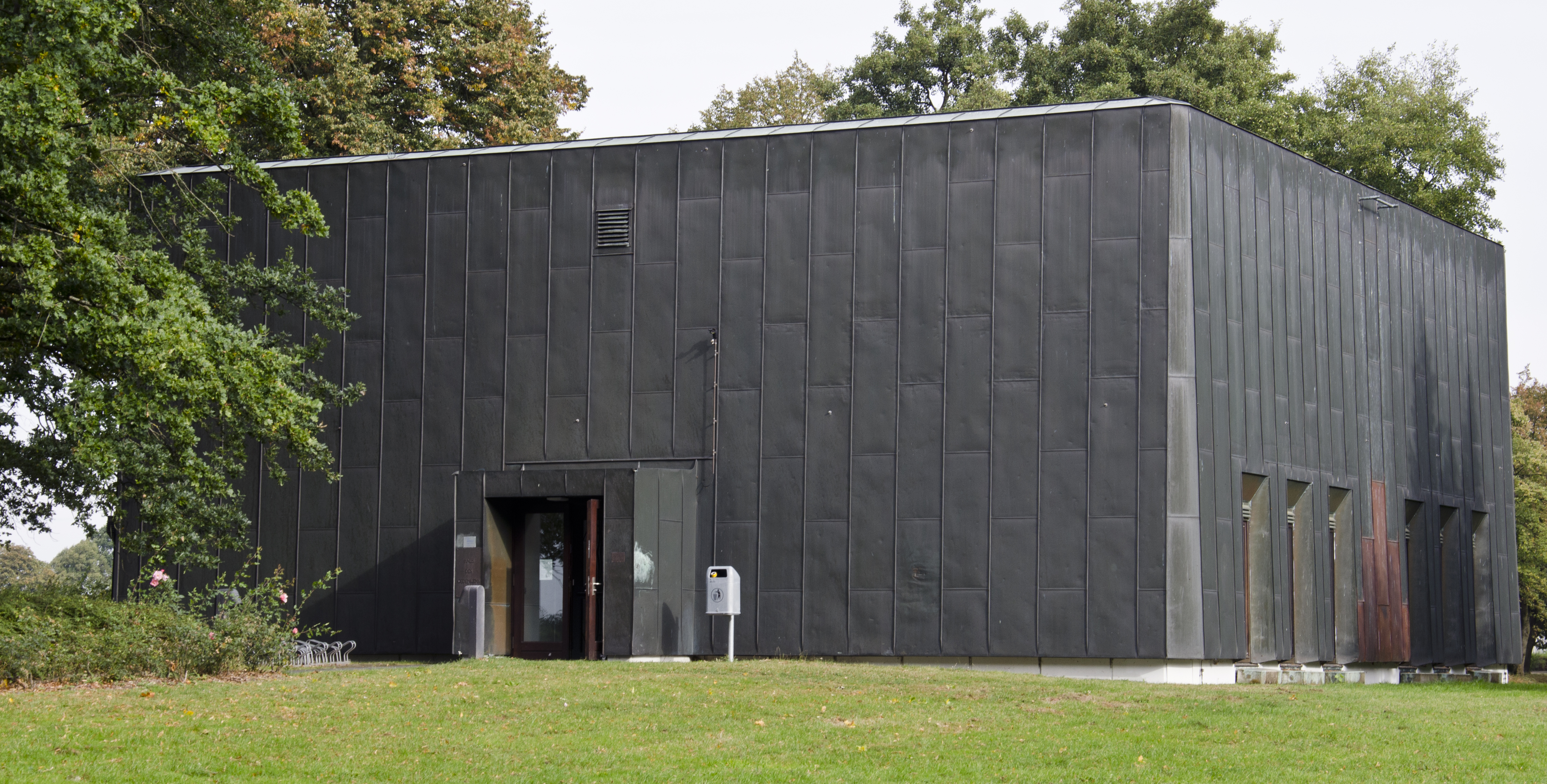
House of Remembrance at the memorial

=== Background ===
As the former concentration camp site was used directly after the war as an internment camp and then as a prison, the history of the atrocities that occurred in Neuengamme and its subcamps was largely forgotten in Hamburg and the rest of Germany.

The first memorial is a simple monument erected on the leftmost (northernmost) edge of the grounds on the site of the former SS plant nursery that had used ashes from the crematorium as fertilizer, far from the contemporaneous prison and the former prisoners compound of the concentration camp. Following intense pressure from the Amicale Internationale de Neuengamme, the main organization representing all former camp prisoners, the memorial was then expanded in 1965. In 1981, an exhibition building (German: Dokumentenhaus) was added, and the first exhibition on the history of the Neuengamme camp was inaugurated. All memorialization is still cut off from the main portion of the former concentration camp that included the barracks, brickworks, and death commandos. In 1984, protests successfully halted the demolition of the former brickworks and several important historical buildings from the former camp were designated as heritage sites. In 1995, the former armaments factory of the Walther company was altered into a permanent exhibition and the Dokumentenhaus remodeled into the House of Remembrance. A new museum was opened in 2005. While decades of pressure from survivors and activists managed to convince the Hamburg Senate to relocate the two prisons standing on the former concentration camp site in 1989, it was in 2003 and 2006 they were officially moved off-site. The entirety of the grounds was thus only incorporated into the memorial site in 2007.

=== Location ===
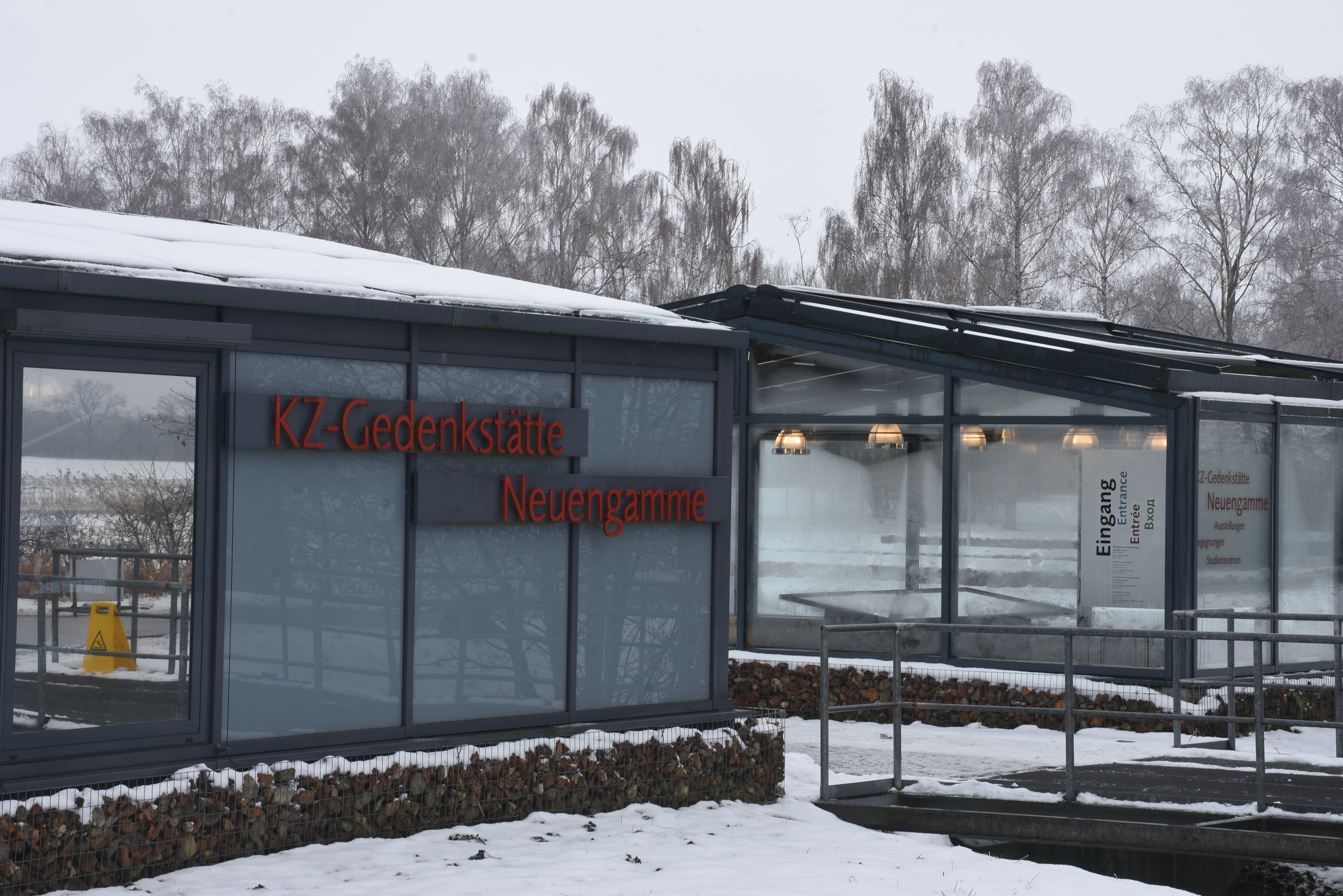

The Neuengamme Concentration Camp Memorial (German: KZ-Gedenkstätte Neuengamme), opened in 2008, is located in Hamburg-Bergedorf at Jean-Dolidier-Weg 75, named for a French activist integral to the creation of the memorial, and renamed from Camp (German: Lager) road. At 57 hectares, the Neuengamme Memorial site is one of the largest memorials in Germany.

The memorial is located southeast of the center of Hamburg-Bergedorf in Hamburg-Neuengamme, halfway in the direction of Zollenspieker. Leading to it is the highway A 25, exit Hamburg Curslack or the Bundesstraße (German for "federal highway") 5 via the street Curslacker Heerweg. A map of situation and structure is available.

=== Exhibitions ===
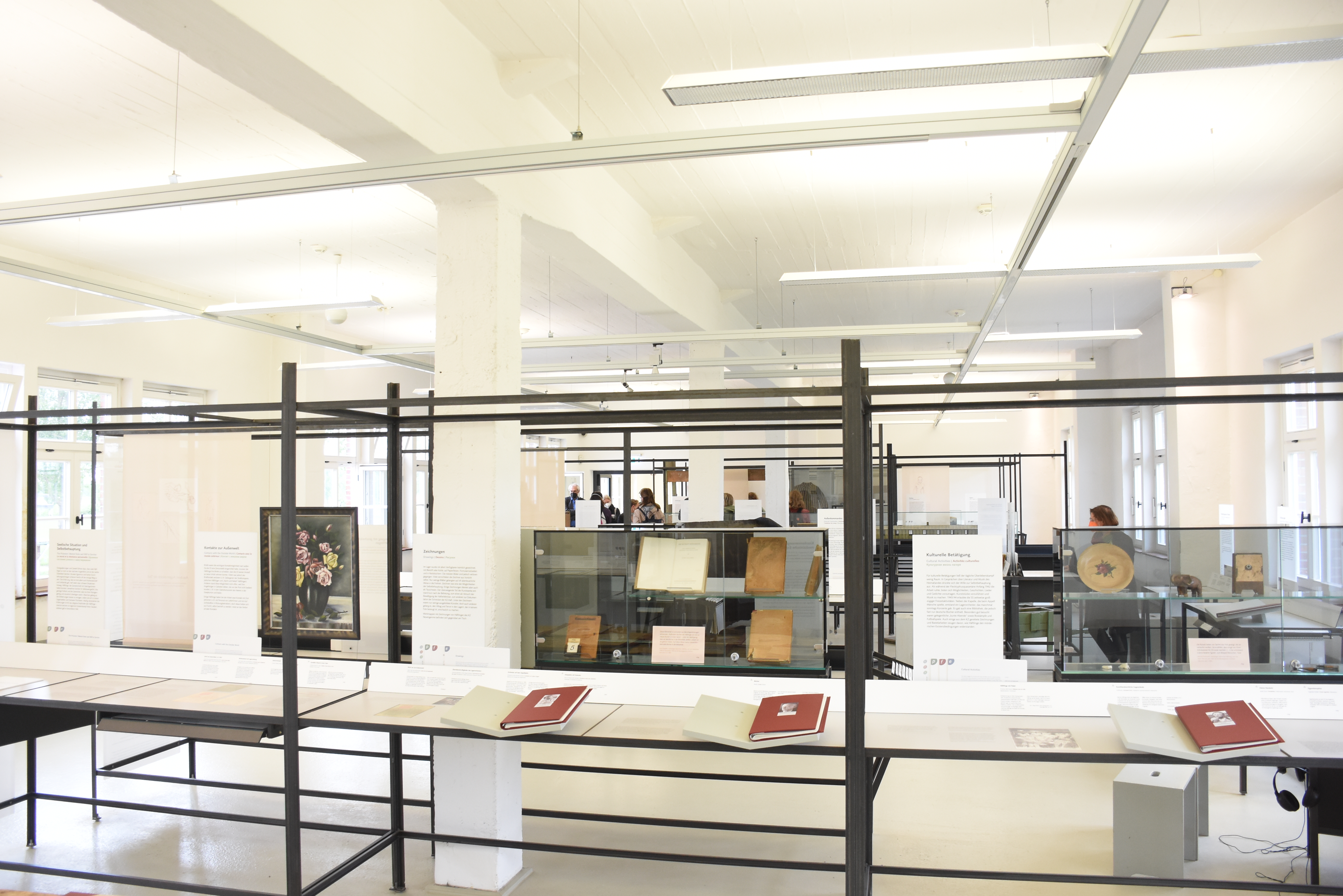
Main exhibition

The site has five permanent exhibitions. Main texts are provided in German, English, French and Russian.

- "Traces of History: Neuengamme Concentration Camp 1938–1945 and Its Post-War History"
- "Posted to Neuengamme Concentration Camp: The Camp SS"
- Mobilisation for the War-Time Economy: Concentration Camp Prisoners as Slave Labourers in Armaments Production"
- "Labour and Annihilation: Concentration Camp Prisoners as Slave Labourers in Brick Production"
- "Prison and Memorial: Documentation of a Contradiction"

=== International mourning place ===
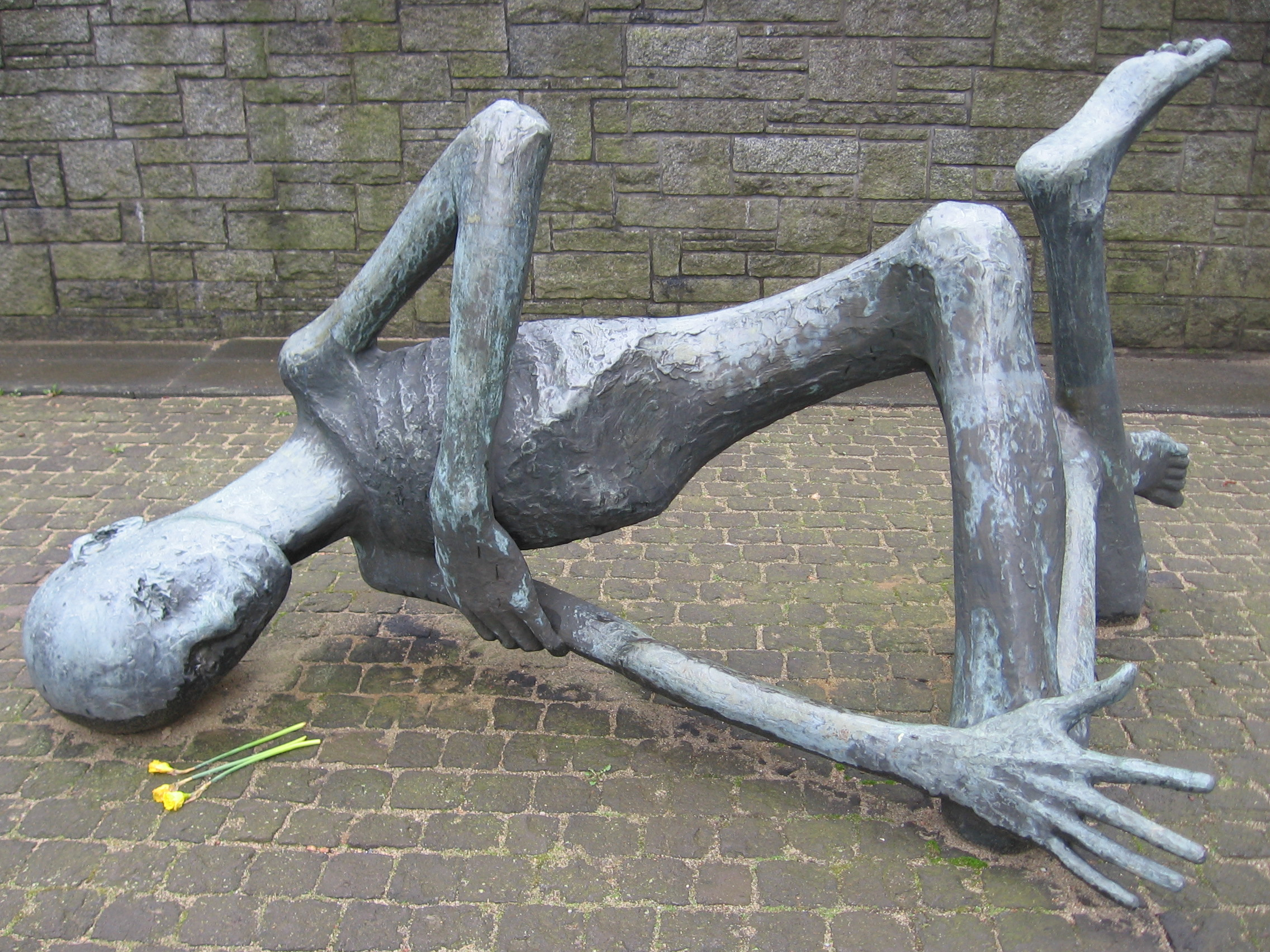
The sculpture "Der sterbende Häftling" (The dying prisoner) by Françoise Salmon at the memorial place of the KZ Neuengamme

The House of Remembrance is in the northern part of the ground. There are files of death, models of the camp and the administration. The Internationales Mahnmal (International mourning place) is an entity of a column (symbol of the crematory). A footpath leads to it, at the right side are plates with the names of all countries where the camp inmates came from. A sculpture of a dying prisoner by Françoise Salmon gives an impression and reminder of the pain. Since 2025 there is a new country memorial plaque. A large circular memorial plate list 70 countries with their current names from which prisoners at the Neuengamme concentration camp originated.

=== Memorial sculpture garden ===
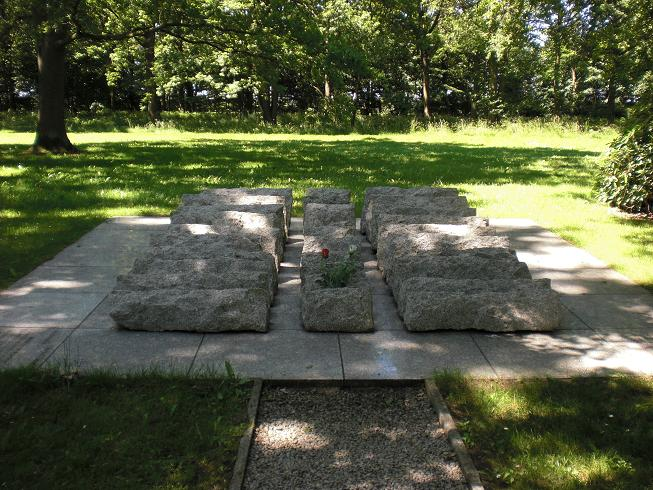
The Warsaw Uprising Memorial

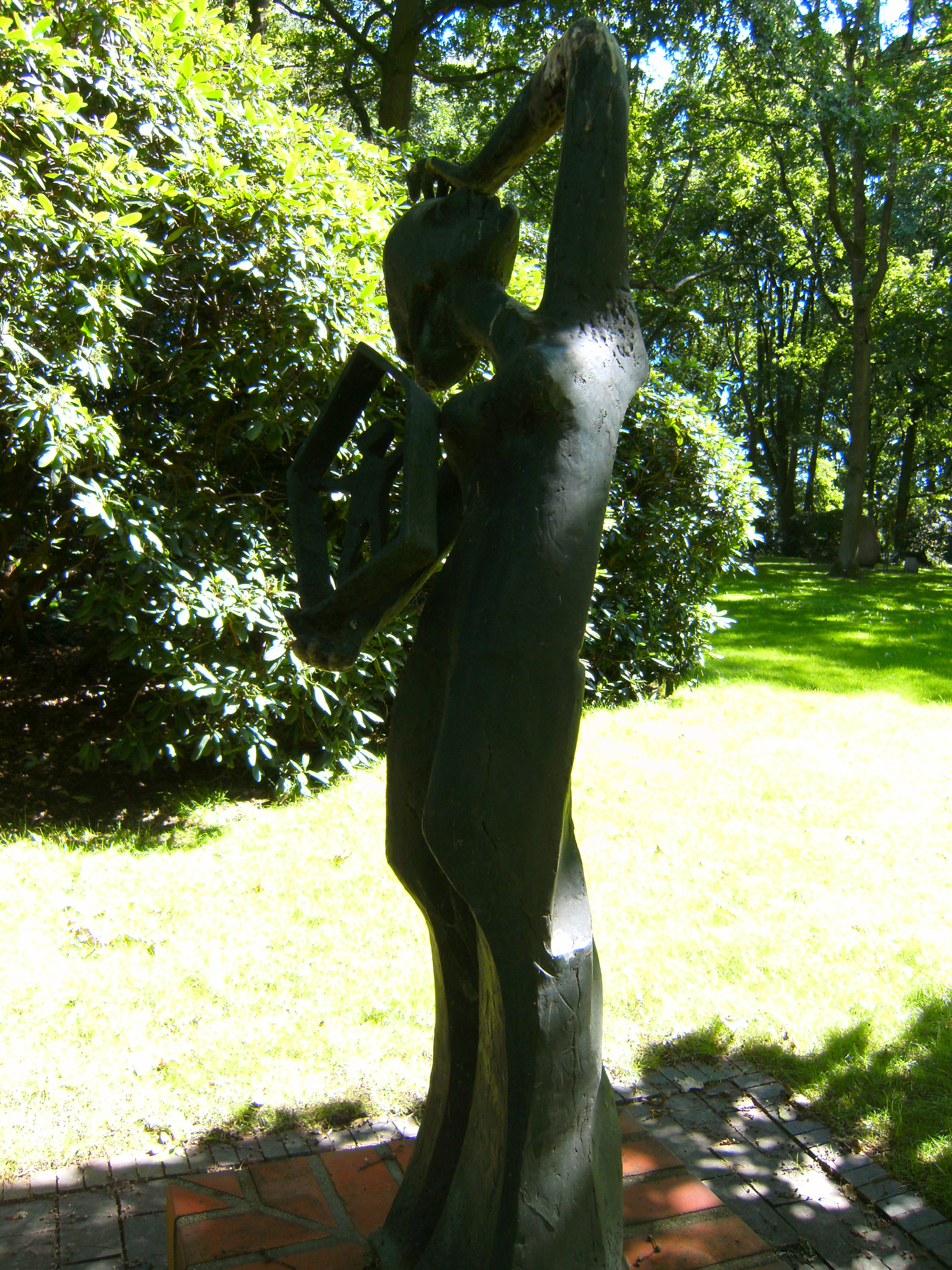
Statue Desperation of Meenzel-Kiezegem. In memory of the victims of the deportation of 1944.

North of the International mourning place (in German: Internationales Mahnmal), a circular path leads through the memorial sculpture garden on the gardening area of former concentration camp. Memorial stones, sculptures and monuments are there erected. On plaques information is given in the languages German, French and English. They witness and are sign of the mourning for persecuted groups, persons deported, inmates and those murdered by action of retaliation.

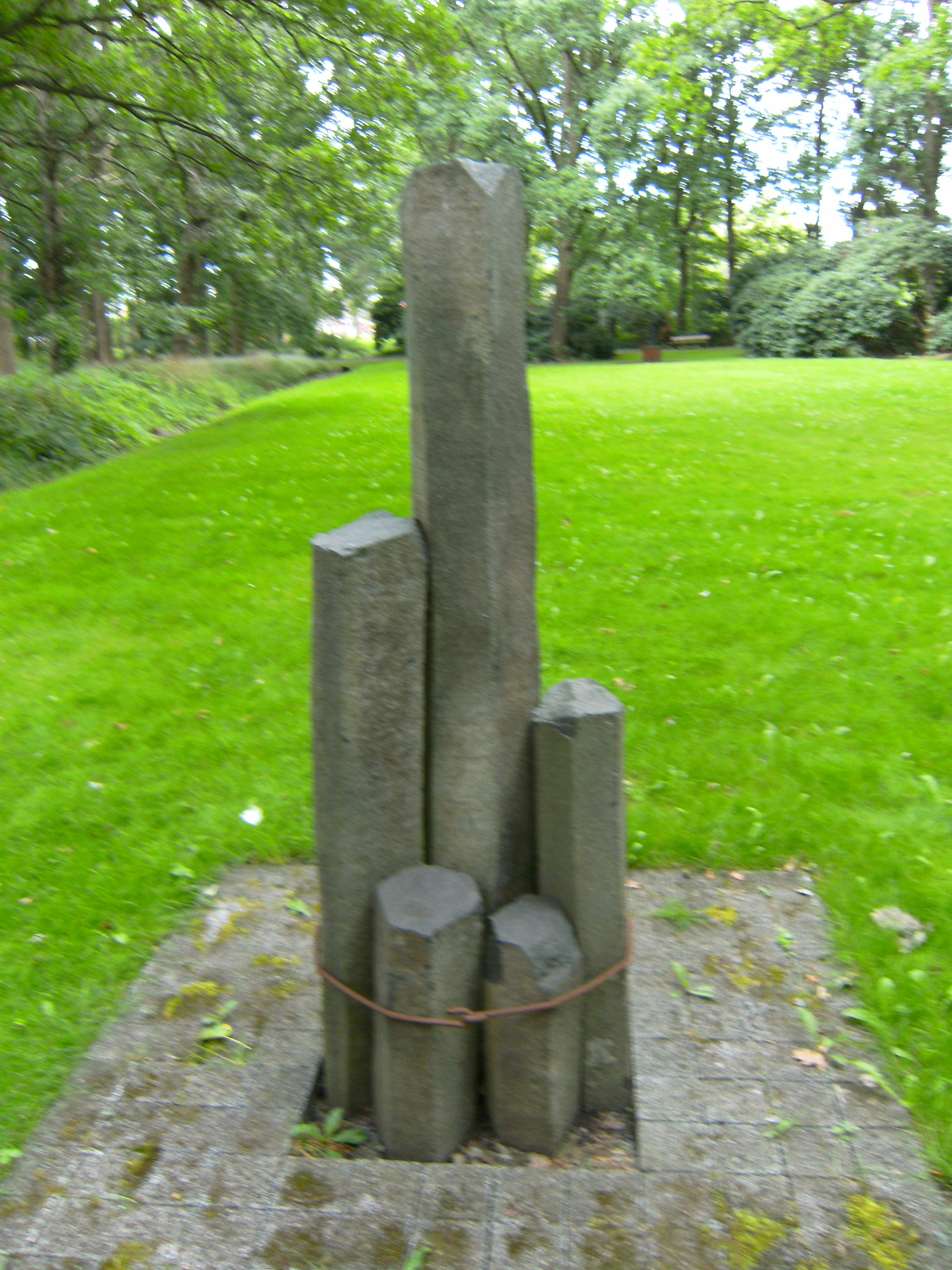
Monument for the deported and murdered Maquis of Murat (Cantal)

The columns of basalt remember July 1944, when the Maquisards from Murat were deported and afterwards murdered in the Neuengamme concentration camp and its affiliates. In total 75 men of 103 died in the concentration camp.

== Cemeteries and memorials outside the former concentration camp grounds ==
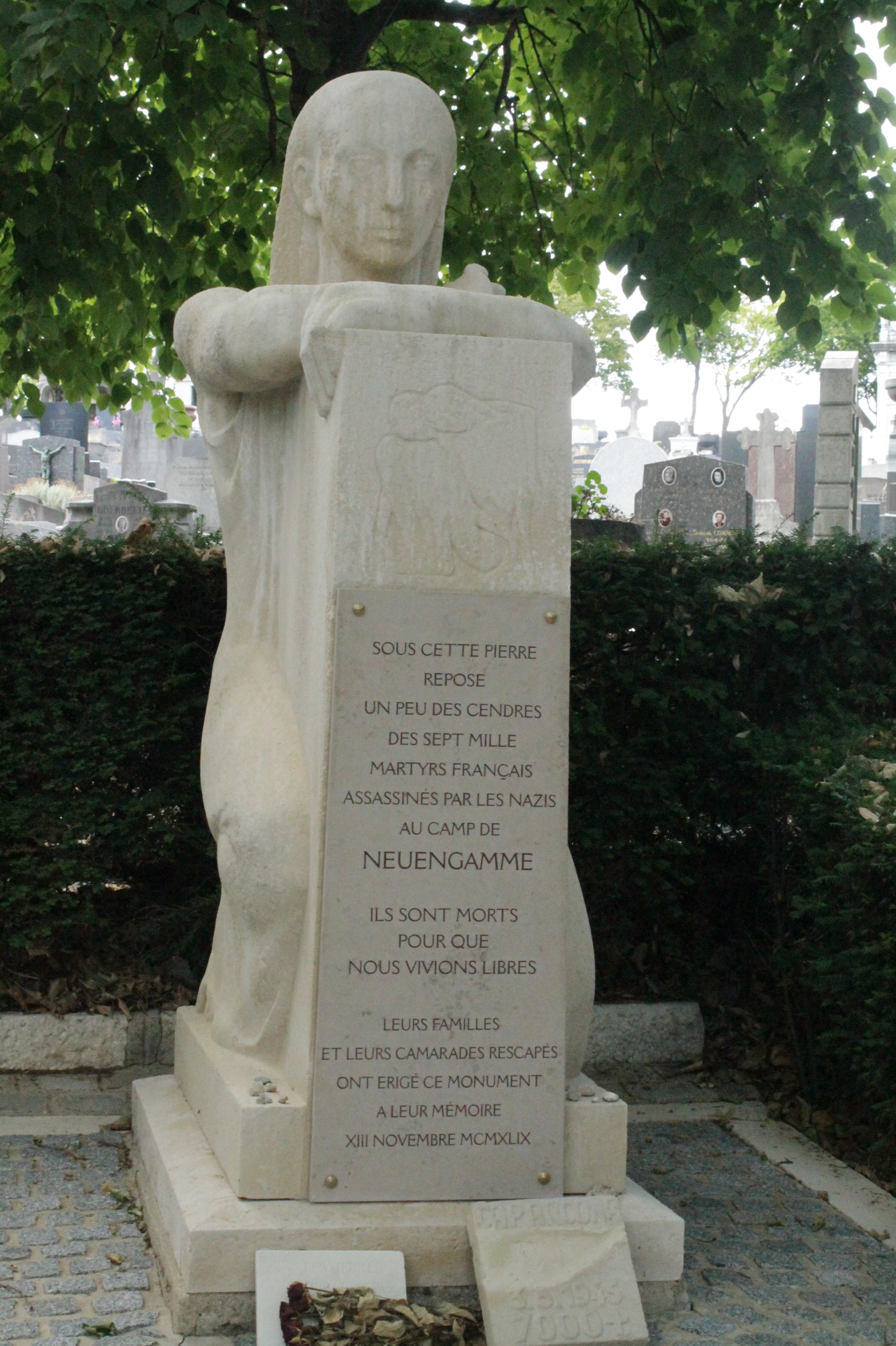
Memorial to Neuengamme Concentration Camp in Pere Lachaise Cemetery in Paris

Three of the Neuengamme satellite camps also serve as public memorials: Bullenhuser Damm, Poppenbüttel, and Fuhlsbüttel. The first of these is a memorial for the 20 children murdered following medical experimentation in the main camp. The second is a former subcamp of Neuengamme in Hamburg-Sasel, where Jewish women from the Lodz Ghetto in Poland were transferred and forced to work in construction. The third is located inside the gatehouse of the Fuhlsbüttel penitentiary. Parts of this complex served as a concentration camp for communists, opponents of the regime and many other groups. About 450 inmates were murdered there during Nazi rule.

A memorial specifically to the French victims of Neuengamme stands in Pere Lachaise Cemetery in Paris.

== Notable inmates ==
- Reinder "Rein" Boomsma, Dutch footballer/ Colonel Dutch Army Retd, Commander of Ordedienst Vesting Veluwe.
- Claude Bourdet, French writer and politician
- Emil František Burian, Czech poet, journalist, singer, actor, musician, composer, dramatic adviser, playwright and director
- Jan Campert, Dutch journalist, theater critic, writer and member of the Dutch Resistance
- Robert Domany, Croatian communist, Partisan and national hero of SFR Yugoslavia
- Ernst Goldenbaum, East German politician
- René Gimpel, French art dealer and collector
- Per Johan Græsli, Norwegian physician
- Coen Hissink, Dutch actor
- Michel Hollard, French colonel and member of the French Resistance
- Sumner Jackson, American medical doctor and member of the French Resistance
- Georges Journois, French Brigadier General and member of the French Resistance
- Anton de Kom, Surinamese resistance fighter
- Henry Wilhelm Kristiansen, Norwegian newspaper editor and politician
- Léonel de Moustier, French politician
- Sergei Nabokov, gay brother of writer Vladimir Nabokov and son of Vladimir Dmitrievich Nabokov; died 9 January 1945 from a combination of dysentery, starvation and exhaustion.
- Fritz Pfeffer, German Jew, occupant of the Anne Frank House
- Tadeusz "Teddy" Pietrzykowski, Polish Boxing champion of Auschwitz, transferred in 1943.
- Chava Rosenfarb, Polish Yiddish writer
- David Rousset, French writer and political activist
- Zuzana Růžičková, Czech harpsichordist
- Karl Säre, Estonian politician
- Kurt Schumacher, German politician
- Jack Tramiel, Polish businessman, founder of Commodore (worked in satellite camp at Ahlem with his father)
- Johann Trollmann, Sinti-German boxer
- Hans van Walsem, Dutch Olympic rower

== Ongoing historical research ==
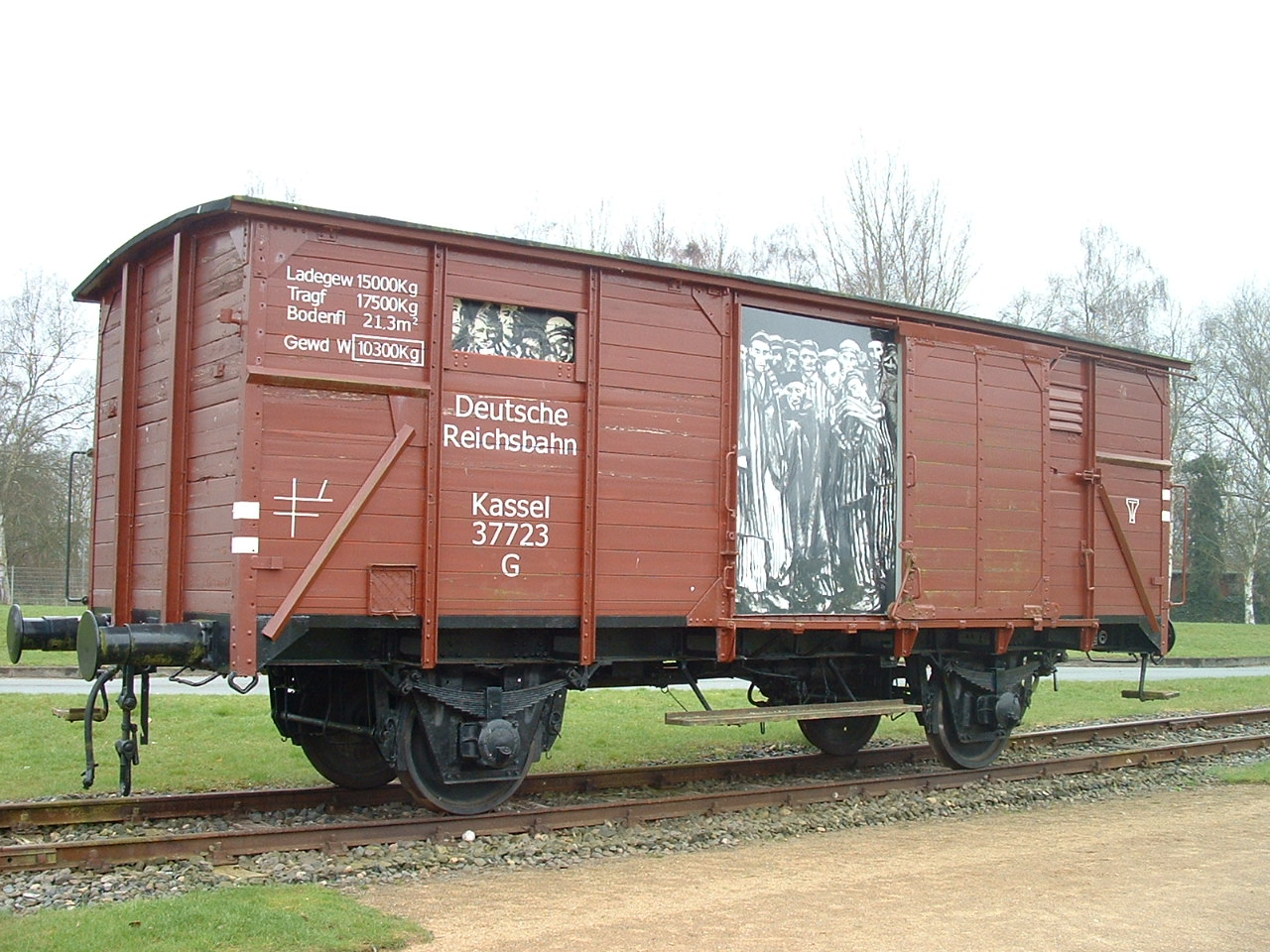
Reconstructed railway wagon at the Neuengamme memorial in which prisoners were transported

Due to the clearing of the Neuengamme camp and the destruction of its records by the SS and the transportation of inmates to other subcamps or other working locations in 1945, the historical work is difficult and ongoing. For example: in 1967 the German Federal Ministry of Justice stated the camp existed from 1 September 1938 until 5 May 1945. The United States Holocaust Memorial Museum states that the camp was established on 13 December 1938 and liberated on 4 May 1945.

== See also ==
- List of Nazi concentration camps
- Celler Hasenjagd (Massacre in Celle after an air raid)
