= Roland Puhr =

SS war criminal

- Puhr during his time in the SS
- Born: 21 January 1914; Staré Křečany, Bohemia, Austria-Hungary
- Died: 15 April 1964 (aged 50); Leipzig Prison, Leipzig, East Germany
- Political party: Nazi Party
- Status: Executed by guillotine
- Motive: Nazism
- Convictions: War crimes Crimes against humanity
- Penalty: Death

Details
- Victims: 30–40+
- Span of crimes: 1938–1945
- Country: Germany and Channel Islands
- Locations: Sachsenhausen concentration camp Lager Sylt
- Date apprehended: June 1963
- Military career
- Allegiance: Nazi Germany
- Branch: Schutzstaffel
- Service years: 1938–1945
- Rank: Unterscharführer
- Unit: SS-Totenkopfverbände

Roland Puhr (21 January 1914 – 15 April 1964) was an SS-Oberscharführer who committed numerous atrocities at Sachsenhausen concentration camp during World War II. After the war, he settled down in East Germany using forged papers. Puhr was exposed as a war criminal in 1963, and executed the following year.

== Early life ==
Puhr was born in Staré Křečany in Bohemia in 1914. He joined the Sudeten German Party in 1936.

== Wartime activities ==
In the 1930s, Puhr joined the Czechoslovak Army. In 1938, he deserted to join the Wehrmacht. In 1939, Puhr joined the Nazi Party. He was then assigned to the SS-Totenkopfverbände and sent to work as a guard at Sachsenhausen concentration camp. During his time, Puhr participated in the shootings of multiple Soviet POWs at the camp's execution site. He personally murdered approximately 30 to 40 prisoners. One prisoner whose murder he participated in was the beating to death of Austrian prosecutor Karl Tuppy, who had initiated the case against SS men Otto Planetta and Franz Holzweber for the murder of Austrian Chancellor Engelbert Dollfuss during the July Putsch in 1934. Planetta and Holzweber were both found guilty of killing Dollfuss and executed. Tuppy had also been involved in the prosecutions of Anton Rintelen, one of the ringleaders in the coup, and Otto Steinhäusl, a police officer who had collaborated. Rintelen and Steinhäusl both received prison terms for treason, albeit they were later released under amnesty agreements with Germany. German communist Rudolf Wunderlich, a survivor of Sachsenhausen, later described finding Tuppy after he was beaten by Puhr and other SS men.

"I had never seen anything like it. His face was gone. Just a piece of completely undefined meat, full of blood, cuts, the eyes completely swollen up."

Tuppy died shortly after being beaten further by SS guards Gustav Sorge and Wilhelm Schubert.

Puhr was suspected of additional targeted killings at an SS construction brigade near Düsseldorf. Puhr was also the first commandant of the Lager Sylt camp in the Channel Islands.

== Exposure, trial, and execution ==
After war ended, Puhr went into hiding using forged papers. He started a new life in Schönhausen. However, in June 1963, Puhr was exposed and arrested by East German authorities. He was charged with war crimes and crimes against humanity. On 16 December 1963, Puhr was found guilty by a court in Neubrandenburg and sentenced to death. His appeal was rejected, and Chairman of the State Council Walter Ulbricht rejected his petition for clemency. Puhr was guillotined at Leipzig Prison on 15 April 1964. His remains were then cremated, and he was buried in an unmarked grave in an undisclosed location.
