= Lager Helgoland =

World War Two labour camp on Alderney

Coordinates: 49°43′6″N 2°12′48″W

Lager Helgoland was a labour camp on Alderney in the Channel Islands, named after the Frisian Island of Heligoland (in German, Helgoland), formerly a Danish and then British possession located 46 kilometres (29 mi) off the German North Sea coastline and belonging to Germany since 1890.

The Germans built four camps, two of which became concentration camps on Alderney, subcamps of the Neuengamme concentration camp (located in Hamburg, Germany). Each camp was named after one of the Frisian Islands: Lager Norderney located at Saye, Lager Borkum at Platte Saline, Lager Sylt near the old telegraph tower at La Foulère and Lager Helgoland, situated in the northwest corner of the island. 700 workers died in the Alderney camps and in shipping moving them to or from the Island (out of a total inmate population of about 6,000).

== Camp ==
The Borkum and Helgoland camps were "volunteer" (Hilfswillige) labour camps and the labourers in those camps were treated harshly but better than the inmates at the Sylt and Norderney camps.

Little remains of Lager Helgoland now.

It was built in January 1942 and was used by the Nazi Organisation Todt, a forced labour programme, to house the labourers to build fortifications including bunkers, gun emplacements, air-raid shelters, and tunnels.

Lager Helgoland was situated in the northwest corner of Alderney. The Borkum and Helgoland camps were "volunteer" (Hilfswillige) labour camps and the labourers in those camps were treated harshly but better than the inmates at the Sylt and Norderney camps. The prisoners in Lager Sylt and Lager Norderney were slave labourers. Sylt camp held Jewish enforced labourers. Norderney camp housed European (usually Eastern but including Republican) and Russian enforced labourers. Lager Borkum was used for German technicians and volunteers from different countries of Europe. Lager Helgoland was filled with Russian Organisation Todt workers.

== See also ==
- Nazi concentration camp list
- Neuengamme concentration camp subcamp list
- The Holocaust
