= Gertrud Heise =

German guard and later SS overseer at several concentration camps

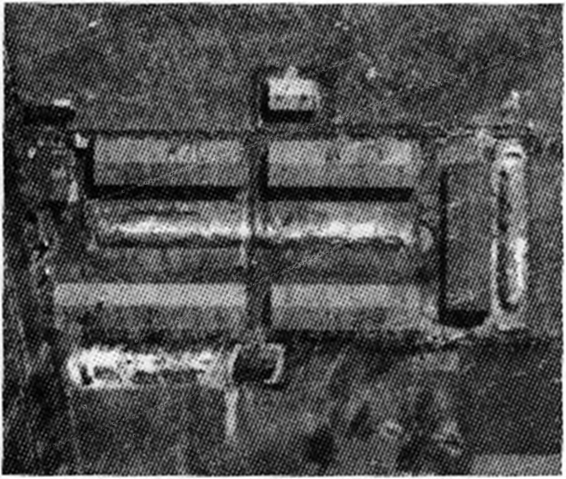
- An aerial reconnaissance photograph of the Bremen-Obernheide concentration camp area, where Gertrud Heise was an Oberaufseherin in the winter of 1944
- Born: 23 July 1921; Berlin, Germany
- Occupation: Guard
- Employer: SS
- Conviction: War crimes
- Trial: Belsen trial
- Penalty: 15 years imprisonment; commuted to 7 years imprisonment

Gertrud Elli Heise (born 23 July 1921) was a female guard and later, SS overseer at several concentration camps during the Second World War. Heise was born in Berlin, Germany. She was tried for war crimes in 1946.

== World War II ==
In 1941, Heise joined the SS Women's Auxiliary and, on 21 November 1941, arrived at Ravensbrück for training. In October 1942, she was one of several women, including Hermine Braunsteiner, to be sent to KZ Majdanek camp near Lublin as an Aufseherin. The gas chambers began operation there in September 1942, with more than 79,000 people exterminated during its 34 months of operation.

Heise worked at the camp until January 1944 when she accompanied a transport of women to Kraków-Płaszów concentration camp on the outskirts of Kraków. She remained there until she was assigned to guard the death march to KZ Auschwitz-Birkenau west, ahead of the Soviet offensive. From there she guarded a prisoner evacuation train in October 1944 to the Neuengamme concentration camp near Hamburg, Germany. In November 1944, Heise was promoted to Oberaufseherin and sent to Obernheide, the subcamp of KZ Neuengamme (Lagerbordell operated there since spring of 1944 with full staff).

At Bremen-Obernheide, she and SS-Hauptscharführer Johann Hille, commanded 500 Hungarian and 300 Polish women prisoners with a very high rate of deaths, regular beatings and denial of rations. Heise fled Obernheide in April 1945 with the evacuation of surviving women prisoners to Bergen-Belsen concentration camp.

Heise was later captured by British soldiers and interrogated. She was placed on trial for war crimes. On 22 May 1946 a British court handed her a sentence of 15 years imprisonment for her already confirmed war crimes. She was released from prison in the early 1950s. Heise was last reported alive in Hamburg in 1970.
