= Arbeitsdorf concentration camp =

Nazi concentration camp in Germany (April–October 1942)

Coordinates: 52°26′N 10°46′E

Arbeitsdorf ('work village') was a Nazi concentration camp in Stadt des KdF-Wagens bei Fallersleben (today Wolfsburg) from 8 April 1942 until 11 October 1942.

== History ==
In 1936, Austrian-born German engineer Ferdinand Porsche designed a car prototype that would be affordable enough for all Germans to buy. He then showed his idea to Adolf Hitler who liked his idea and ordered its manufacture. The car, known as the KdF-Wagen, became the Volkswagen Beetle after World War II.

With Hitler's approval, Porsche and his business partner Albert Speer set up a factory in Fallersleben. Because of the war, all production from this factory was to be used for military purposes. In 1939 he looked for inmates to work there, and the factory became a prison camp. In 1942, Porsche and Speer started a project to see how they could use inmates for cheaper, and large-scale production of their cars. The prisoners of Arbeitsdorf became a skilled workforce used for construction tasks, building a casting plant and other facilities, and received better captivity conditions in return.

So on 8 April 1942 a new concentration camp, Arbeitsdorf, was opened with 800 inmates from the Neuengamme concentration camp. The camp commands of Neuengamme and Arbeitsdorf were united in the person of Martin Weiss, the camp commander of Neuengamme at this time. On 26 April 1942 inmates from the Sachsenhausen concentration camp and on 23 June inmates from Buchenwald arrived. In mid-July 1942 the camp commander became Wilhelm Schitli, former Schutzhaft-camp commander in Neuengamme.

== Closing and the death toll of the camp ==
On 11 October 1942, six months after the camp was first established, vehicle production stopped and the camp was closed. A minimum of six prisoners perished at Arbeitsdorf. These six deaths are officially listed as suicide, heart attack or accident.

== Memorial ==
The museum Stadtmuseum Schloss Wolfsburg has documentation about the victims with its own exhibition about the slave workers at the Volkswagen factory.

== See also ==
- List of subcamps of Neuengamme
- Glossary of Nazi Germany
- The Holocaust
- List of concentration and internment camps
- List of Nazi concentration camps
- Nazi concentration camps
- Nazi Party
- World War II

== Sources ==
- "Aussenlagerliste: Fallersleben (Arbeitsdorf)". KZ-Gedenkstätte Neuengamme (in German). n.d.
