= Lager Borkum =

German labour camp on Alderney, in the Channel Islands

Coordinates: 49°42′54″N 2°11′10″W

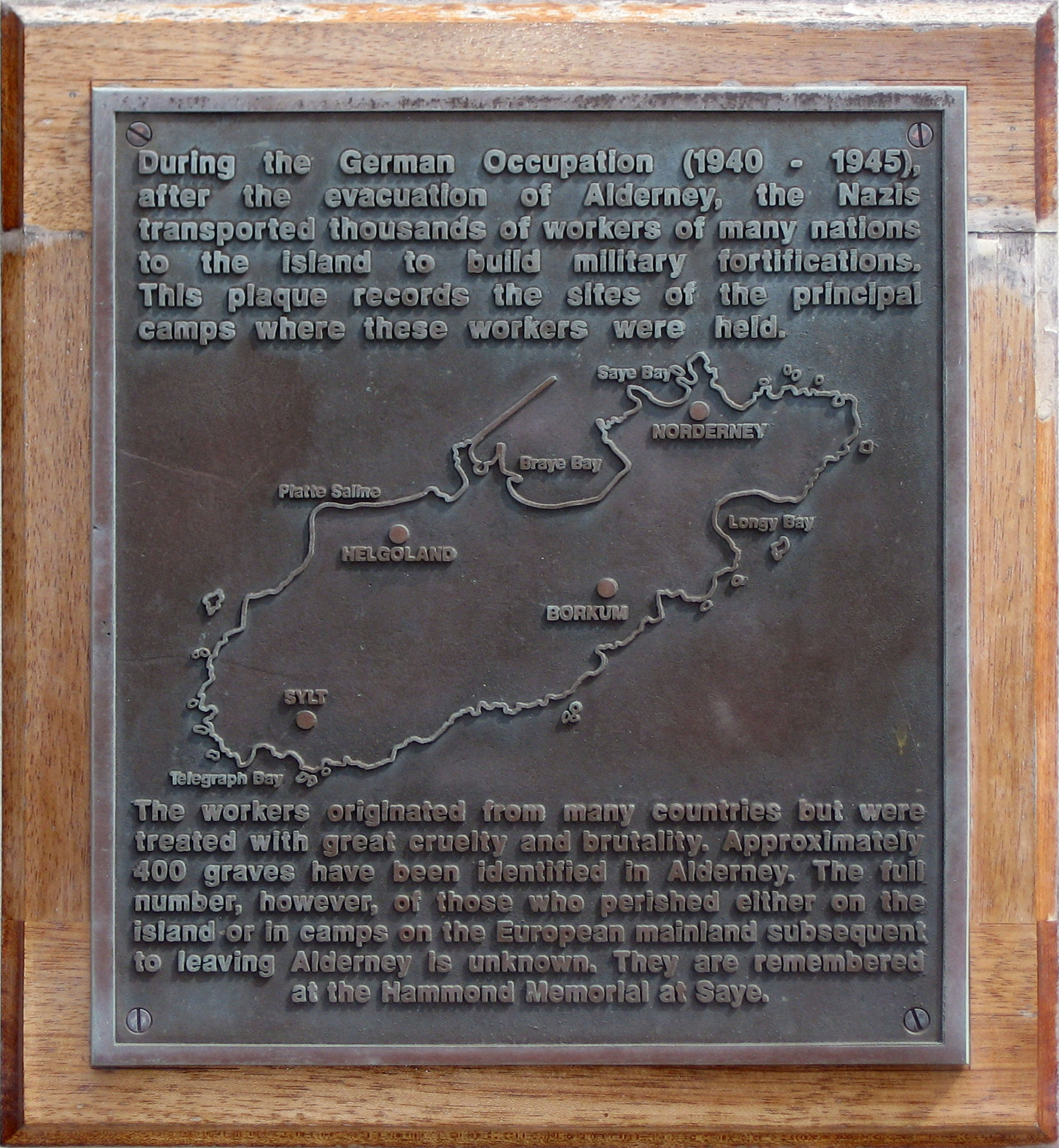
Informational plaque about the German camps on Alderney.

Lager Borkum was a labour camp on Alderney, in the Channel Islands, named after the East Frisian Island of Borkum.

The Germans built four camps, two of which became concentration camps on the island, subcamps of the Neuengamme concentration camp (located in Hamburg, Germany). Each camp was named after one of the Frisian Islands: Lager Norderney located at Saye, Lager Borkum at Platte Saline, Lager Sylt near the old telegraph tower at La Foulère and Lager Helgoland, situated in the northwest corner of the island. Over 700 workers died in the Alderney camps (out of a total inmate population of about 6,000) and in ships moving them to and from the Island.

== Camp ==
Little remains of Lager Borkum now. The gateposts still stand, but now form the entry to the island's tip - the impot.

It was built by the Organisation Todt (OT) in January 1942 by and for their forced labourers. It was used by the OT, a forced labour programme, to build fortifications including bunkers, gun emplacements, air-raid shelters, and other concrete structures.

The Borkum and Helgoland camps were "volunteer" (Hilfswillige) labour camps and the labourers in those camps were paid but treated harshly – though better than the inmates at the Sylt and Norderney camps.

Lager Borkum was located near the centre of Alderney and was the smallest of the four camps. The Borkum and Helgoland camps were "volunteer" (Hilfswillige) labour camps. The prisoners in Lager Sylt and Lager Norderney were slave labourers forced to build the many military fortifications and installations throughout Alderney. Sylt camp held Jewish enforced labourers. Norderney camp housed European (usually Eastern but including Spaniard) and Russian enforced labourers.

Lager Borkum was used for paid German technicians and volunteers from different countries of Europe. Lager Helgoland was filled with Russian OT volunteer workers.

== See also ==
- Nazi concentration camp list
- Neuengamme concentration camp subcamp list
- The Holocaust
