= Lager Sylt =

Nazi concentration camp

Coordinates: 49°42′14″N 2°13′4″W

- Concentration camp
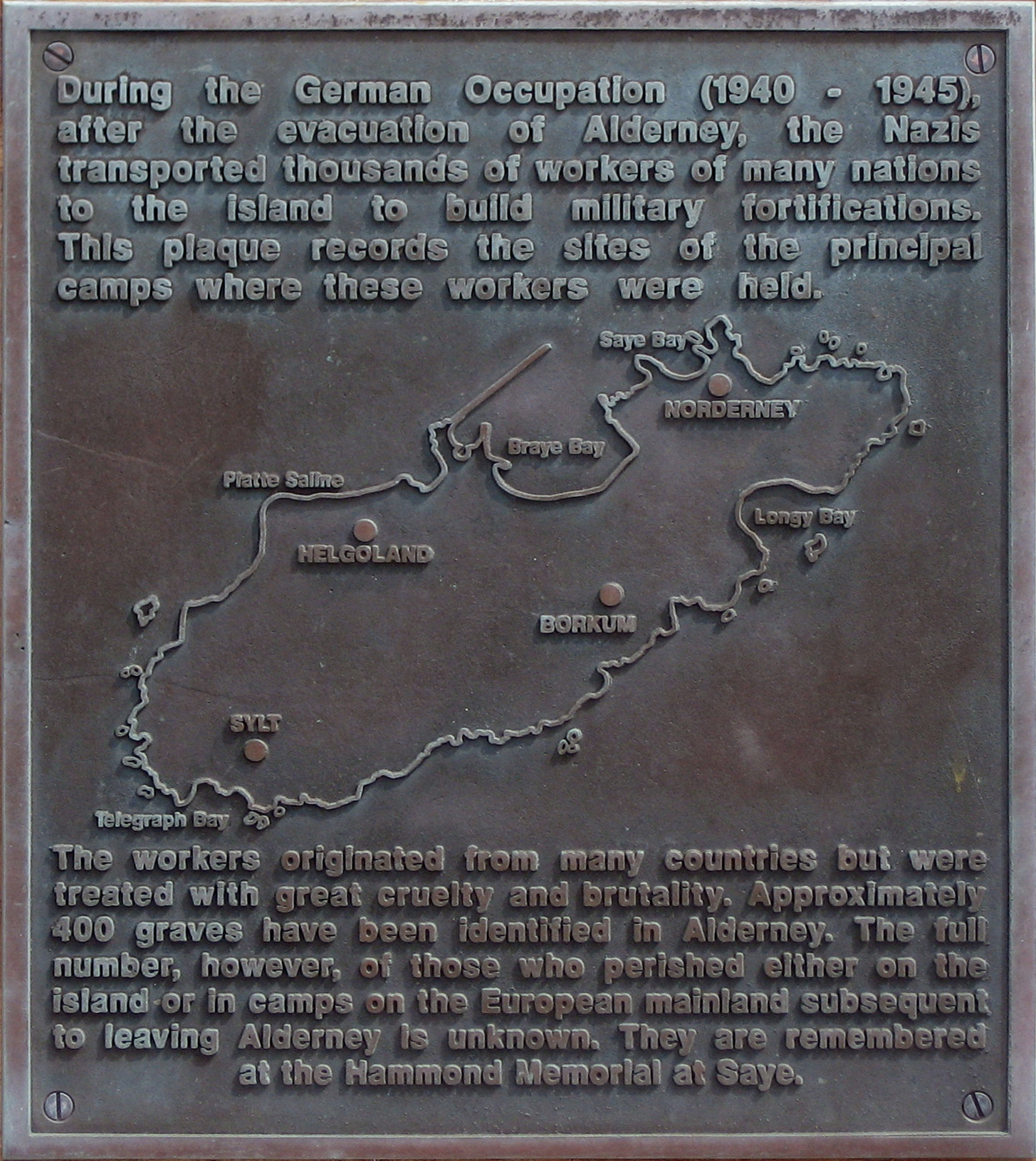
- Plaque remembering the Alderney camps

- Location within Channel Islands
- Location: Alderney, Bailiwick of Guernsey
- Built by: Organisation Todt
- Operated by: Schutzstaffel - SS-Baubrigade 1
- Commandant: Roland Puhr, Karl Tietz
- First built: 1942
- Operational: March 1943 - June 1944
- Inmates: Jewish, Eastern European, Spanish and Russian enforced labourers
- Killed: 400+
- Liberated by: British Army

Lager Sylt was a Nazi concentration camp on Alderney in the British Crown Dependency in the Channel Islands. Built in 1942, along with three other labour camps by the Organisation Todt, the control of Lager Sylt changed from March 1943 to June 1944 when it was run by the Schutzstaffel - SS-Baubrigade 1 and Lager Sylt became a subcamp of the Neuengamme concentration camp (located in Hamburg, Germany).

== Alderney camps ==
Each Alderney camp was named after one of the Frisian Islands: Lager Norderney located at Saye, Lager Helgoland at Platte Saline, Lager Sylt near the old telegraph tower at La Foulère and Lager Borkum, situated near the Impot. Two of these camps were the only Nazi concentration camps on British soil.

The Borkum and Helgoland camps were "volunteer" (Hilfswillige) labour camps and the labourers in those camps were treated harshly but better than the inmates at the Sylt and Norderney camps and were paid for work done. Lager Borkum was used for German technicians and volunteers from different countries of Europe. Lager Helgoland was filled with Russian Organisation Todt workers. (For further information on Alderney camps, see Appendix F: Concentration Camps: Endlösung – The Final Solution; Alderney, a Nazi concentration camp on an island Anglo-Norman.)

== Lager Sylt ==
Today, little remains of the camp. Three gateposts to the rear of the island's airport mark the entrance; one has had a commemorative plaque attached. Some ruins remain, including a number of sentry posts, some foundations and a small tunnel, which led from the camp commandant's house to the inside of the camp. The commandant's house was later moved to another part of the island.

It was built by the Organisation Todt (OT) in January 1942 by and for their forced labourers who would be employed in building fortifications including bunkers, gun emplacements, air-raid shelters and tunnels.

Sylt camp held Jewish enforced labourers. The prisoners in Lager Sylt and Lager Norderney were slave labourers forced to build the many military fortifications and installations throughout Alderney. Norderney camp housed European (usually Eastern but including Republican Spaniard) and Russian enforced labourers.

The Lager Sylt commandant, Karl Tietz, had a black French colonial as an under officer. Shocked to see a black man beating up white men from the camp, a German naval officer threatened to shoot him if he saw him doing it again. Tietz was brought before a court-martial in April 1943 and sentenced to 18 months penal servitude for the crime of selling cigarettes, watches and other valuables he had bought from Dutch OT workers on the black market.

It was taken over by the Schutzstaffel – SS-Baubrigade I, which was first under supervision of the Sachsenhausen concentration camp; from mid-February 1943 it ran under the Neuengamme camp in northern Germany, located near the old telegraph tower at La Foulère. It was used by the Organisation Todt, a forced labour programme, to build bunkers, gun emplacements, air-raid shelters, and concrete fortifications on the island.

=== Post-war ===
Alderney has been nicknamed "the island of silence", because not much is known about what occurred there during the occupation. The German officer left in charge of the facilities, Commandant Oberst Schwalm, burned the camps to the ground and destroyed all records connected with their use before the island was liberated by British forces on 16 May 1945. The German garrison on Alderney surrendered a week after the other Channel Islands, and was one of the last garrisons to surrender in Europe. The population were not allowed to start returning until December 1945.

Over 700 of the OT workers are said to have lost their lives in Alderney, or in shipping that was sunk; the remaining inmates transferred to France in 1944.

The States (Alderney's governing body) decline to commemorate the sites of the four labour camps. Local historian Colin Partridge feels this may be due to the locals' desire to dissociate themselves from the accusations of collaboration. A faded memorial plate, tucked away behind the island's parish church, vaguely mentions 45 Soviet citizens who died on Alderney in 1940–1945, without saying how they died and why.

In June 1963, Roland Puhr, the first commandant of the Lager Sylt camp, was arrested in East Germany for unrelated atrocities committed in Sachsenhausen concentration camp. He was sentenced to death, and executed in 1964.

== See also ==
- List of Nazi concentration camps
- Neuengamme concentration camp subcamp list
- The Holocaust
