= Lager Norderney =

Nazi concentration camp on Alderney

Coordinates: 49°43′41″N 2°10′41″W

Lager Norderney was a Nazi concentration camp on Alderney, in the Channel Islands, named after the East Frisian island of Norderney.

The German Organisation Todt (OT) built four labour camps in Alderney to house workers for the planned fortifications. Lager Norderney located at Saye, Lager Borkum off Longis Hill, Lager Sylt near the old telegraph tower at La Foulère and Lager Helgoland, situated behind Platte Saline. the control of Lager Norderney changed from March 1943 to June 1944 when it was run by the Schutzstaffel - SS-Baubrigade and Lager Norderney became a subcamp of the Neuengamme concentration camp (located in Hamburg, Germany).

== Alderney camps ==
Each Alderney camp was named after one of the Frisian Islands: Lager Norderney located at Saye, Lager Helgoland at Platte Saline, Lager Sylt near the old telegraph tower at La Foulère and Lager Borkum, situated near the Impot. Two of these camps were the only Nazi concentration camps on British soil, the other two were labour camps.

The labour housed in the camps were used by the OT in a forced labour programme, to supply labour to build fortifications including bunkers, gun emplacements, air-raid shelters and other concrete defensive structures.

Norderney camp housed European (mostly Russian and other Eastern but including Spaniard) enforced labourers. The prisoners in Lager Norderney and Lager Sylt were slave labourers. The Borkum and Helgoland camps were "volunteer" (Hilfswillige) labour camps and the labourers in those camps were treated harshly but better than the inmates at the Sylt and Norderney camps. Lager Borkum was used for German technicians and volunteers from different countries of Europe. Lager Helgoland was filled with Russian Organisation Todt workers.

== Norderney Camp ==
The camp was built up by the OT after January 1942 and run by them until in March 1943 when it was handed over to the Schutzstaffel - SS-Baubrigade I—which was first under supervision of the Sachsenhausen concentration camp; and ran under the Neuengamme camp in northern Germany.

Some of the structures of Lager Norderney still remain, and the site is now a camping site for tourists. Close by is a tunnel from the camp to the beach, which is it is claimed was used by the Nazis as a shelter, or possibly as a killing site.

Over 700 OT workers lost their lives in the island and in shipping traveling to or from Alderney, before the workers were transferred to France to help build the Atlantic Wall. The destruction of Norderney Camp by the Nazis began in March 1942 and the camps were closed after the Normandy invasion in June 1944.

== See also ==
- Nazi concentration camp list
- Neuengamme concentration camp subcamp list
- The Holocaust
