= Heinz Baumkötter =

German SS officer (1912–2001)

Personal details
- Born: 7 February 1912 Burgsteinfurt, Kingdom of Prussia, German Empire
- Died: 22 April 2001 (aged 89) Münster, North Rhine-Westphalia, Germany

Military service
- Allegiance: Nazi Germany
- Branch/service: Schutzstaffel
- Rank: Hauptsturmführer

Heinz Baumkötter (7 February 1912 – 22 April 2001) was an SS-Hauptsturmführer and concentration camp medical doctor in Mauthausen, Natzweiler-Struthof and Sachsenhausen, who conducted medical experiments on concentration camp inmates.

Baumkötter was tried in the Sachsenhausen trials by a Soviet military tribunal in 1947 in a trial held in the former city hall in Berlin-Pankow. Among his co-defendants were the former commandant of Sachsenhausen Anton Kaindl, the record keeper Gustav Sorge and the Blockfuhrer of the punishment block Kurt Eccarius. At the trial Baumkötter was asked what his duties were at the trial:

The Prosecutor: "What position did you have at Sachsenhausen?"

Baumkötter: "I had to personally attend or to send a subordinate to the executions, to punishments, to shootings, hangings or gassings… to make the list of sick detainees and of those unfit for work, who were to be transferred to other camps and, lastly, I had to make experiments in accordance with the orders received."

The Prosecutor: "How many detainees were sent for extermination in other camps on your orders?"

Baumkötter: (after meditating for a long time): "About 8,000 detainees were sent off on the basis of the lists I made."

Baumkötter was found guilty of war crimes and sentenced to 25 years in prison with hard labor, which he served in the coal mines of Vorkuta Gulag. He was released early in 1956, when the Soviet Union released remaining German POWs. He was re-arrested by the West German police in July the same year, and was held in custody until November 1959. On 19 February 1962, a court sentenced him to eight years in prison. The court took into consideration his stint in the Gulag as sufficient punishment and released him.

After 1965 he worked as a research assistant at the pharmaceutical company Grünenthal.
