= Mike Cumberlege =

British Royal Navy officer and Special Operations Executive agent of the Second World War

- Born: 26 October 1905; St George Hanover Square, London
- Died: 1945; Germany
- Relatives: Rear Admiral Claude Cumberlege (father)
- Military career
- Allegiance: United Kingdom
- Branch: Royal Navy
- Service years: 1926–1945
- Rank: Lieutenant Commander
- Commands: HMS Dolphin; HMS Hedgehog
- Conflicts: Second World War
- Awards: Distinguished Service Order & Bar; Decoration for Officers of the Royal Naval Reserve; War Cross (Greece)
- Other work: Intelligence officer Special Operations Executive agent

Lieutenant Commander Claude Michael Bulstrode Cumberlege, DSO & Bar, RD (26 October 1905 – 1945) was a British Royal Navy officer and Special Operations Executive agent of the Second World War. He was tortured, and eventually executed, by the Germans after being captured while on Operation Locksmith in Greece.

== Early life ==
Cumberlege was born into a naval family, the son of Claude Lionel Cumberlege and Sarah Laetitia Crossley Couldwell of Gibraltar. His father retired as a rear admiral in 1926, having served in the Royal Australian Navy in the First World War on secondment from the Royal Navy. Mike was educated at The Nautical College, Pangbourne, before entering the Merchant Navy as a midshipman on 1 May 1922. In 1926 he became an officer in the Royal Naval Reserve. Between 1937 and 1940 he lived in Antibes, and spent his time skippering yachts in the Mediterranean.

== War service ==
In 1940 Cumberlege was called up for active service. For the first six months of that year he was attached to a British anti-smuggling and intelligence naval unit based in Marseilles. After the Fall of France he served briefly as a liaison officer to Charles de Gaulle. He then worked with British intelligence in Cape Verde. Late in January 1941 he was transferred to the Special Operations Executive's (SOE) Middle East section, and a few weeks later he was appointed to lead para-naval SOE operations in the Middle East based in Haifa and Alexandria (Force 133).

Cumberlege was tasked with undertaking covert and disruptive action in Greece during and after the Battle of Greece. For this purpose, he and his team operated a lightly armed caïque called HMS Dolphin II. In April 1941 Cumberlege secretly navigated the Corinth Canal and laid a time-delayed mine and depth charges; however, the charges failed to detonate. The failure of the mission was a blow to British military strategy in North Africa, but in his report the Director of Naval Intelligence went out of his way to exonerate Cumberlege from blame. Meantime, Cumberlege had participated in Operation Demon, the Allied evacuation from Greece. Dolphin II ferried troops from the beaches of Navplion and Monemvasia to British transports before sailing for Crete. In Canae, Cumberlege met with Captain Nicholas Hammond and Rhodesian private James 'Jumbo' Steele, the latter would eventually join him for Operation Locksmith. Cumberlege had befriended the archaeologist John Pendlebury before the war and they planned to raid the Dodecanese islands but the German airborne invasion of Crete prevented the operation from being carried out. The engines of Dolphin II having given out, Cumberlege commandeered the caique Athanassios Miaoulis and escaped from Crete with his cousin Major Cleland Cumberlege, Hammond, Steele, Able Seaman Saunders and a Greek crew. After they crossed the Kasos Strait, they were machine-gunned by a German aircraft, Cleland and Saunders were killed and Cumberlege wounded but they managed to reach Mersa Matruh.

After the Battle of Crete, Cumberlege aided in the evacuation of dozens of Allied personnel who were stranded on occupied Crete. The caïques HMS Escampador and HMS Hedgehog (which were under the command of Cumberlege), successfully rescued 550 Allied troops from the Cretan coast. Once pre-arranged evacuations became impossible, he spent three weeks surreptitiously mapping the deserted south coast of Crete between Cape Litinon and Tsoutsouros Bay, looking for landing beaches and hide-outs for small craft and landing several SOE agents and supplies, without being detected. For this work he was awarded the Distinguished Service Order on 20 January 1942. The success of the operations led to the immediate expansion of para-naval SOE operations in the area. In the spring of 1942, Cumberlege contracted paratyphoid, took medical leave and spent time in London with his wife and son, before returning to the Mediterranean.

=== Operation Locksmith ===
On 7 January 1943, Cumberlege and his SOE team of Sergeant Major James C. Steele, Sergeant Thomas E. Handley (radio operator) and Czech Corporal Jan Kotrba embarked on Operation Locksmith. It was at Beirut they boarded the Greek submarine Papanicolis. The operation was a fresh attempt to block the Corinth Canal, applying the lessons which had been learnt from the failed 1941 attempt. Cumberlege was centrally involved in the planning process, and led the mission. Cumberlege's superiors, however, rejected inserting a Greek-speaking man. On 5 March, having travelled to the canal and set up a hideout, the team placed their explosives in the canal. The explosives floated in the water and failed to detonate, and ten days later SOE HQ in Cairo concluded that the mission had failed.

On 19 March, Cumberlege, still at his hideout, reported that he was aware that Italian secret police were searching for his party. In early April, the Abwehr had intercepted signals from a clandestine radio operating in the Hydra area and three patrol boats were sent to triangulate the position. A German patrol was put ashore in the Tselevinia area and Cumberlege's hideout was discovered. Cumberlege and his group managed to escape, but most of their communications equipment was captured. Three days later the group received a message ostensibly from SOE Cairo that a British submarine was coming to rescue it. On the night of 30 April, the group was captured by German forces who had lured them into a trap using the captured communications equipment.

=== Prisoner of war ===
Cumberlege and his colleagues were taken to Averoff Prison in Athens in May 1943. Despite the German policy of summarily executing captured Allied commandos, Cumberlege was not immediately shot. Instead he was transferred with his colleagues to the Mauthausen-Gusen concentration camp. There, under duress, Cumberlege signed a statement confirming that the Locksmith group were saboteurs – despite having been captured in uniform. In January 1944, Cumberlege was moved to Sachsenhausen concentration camp. Here he was held in solitary confinement and refused Red Cross parcels. At some point in February 1945 (according to Paul Schroter, an orderly in the Zellenbau, the date was April 1945), he was executed by the Germans, although the exact date and location are unknown. Arthur Reade, a prosecuting lawyer for war crimes who interviewed the commandant of Sachsenhausen, Anton Kaindl, believed that Cumberlege was killed in Flossenbürg together with Sergeant Major James C. Steele and possibly Sergeant Thomas E. Handley.

Cumberlege was awarded a posthumous Bar to his DSO in 1946 for the second attempt to attack the canal. He had also been awarded the Greek War Cross.

== Personal life ==
Cumberlege married a Canadian, Nancy Wooler, in 1936. Together they had one son, Marcus, a poet, who was born in Antibes, France, and died in 2019 at the age of 80 in Bruges, Belgium. He was survived by a daughter, Eunice. In 1947, Nancy married Lt.-Col. Lennox John Livingstone-Learmonth, M.C., D.S.O.

Cumberlege is commemorated on the Chatham Naval Memorial and on the Sachsenhausen Concentration Camp memorial plaque for British and Commonwealth forces. He was additionally honoured with a division at Britannia Royal Naval College named after him, which functions to train Royal Naval Reserve officer cadets throughout their stay at the college during the Accelerated Officers Programme.

A biography of Cumberlege was published in 2018 – The Extraordinary Life of Mike Cumberlege SOE – written by Robin Knight and published by Fonthill Media.
