= Kurt Eccarius =

German SS functionary and war criminal (1905–1984)

Kurt Eccarius

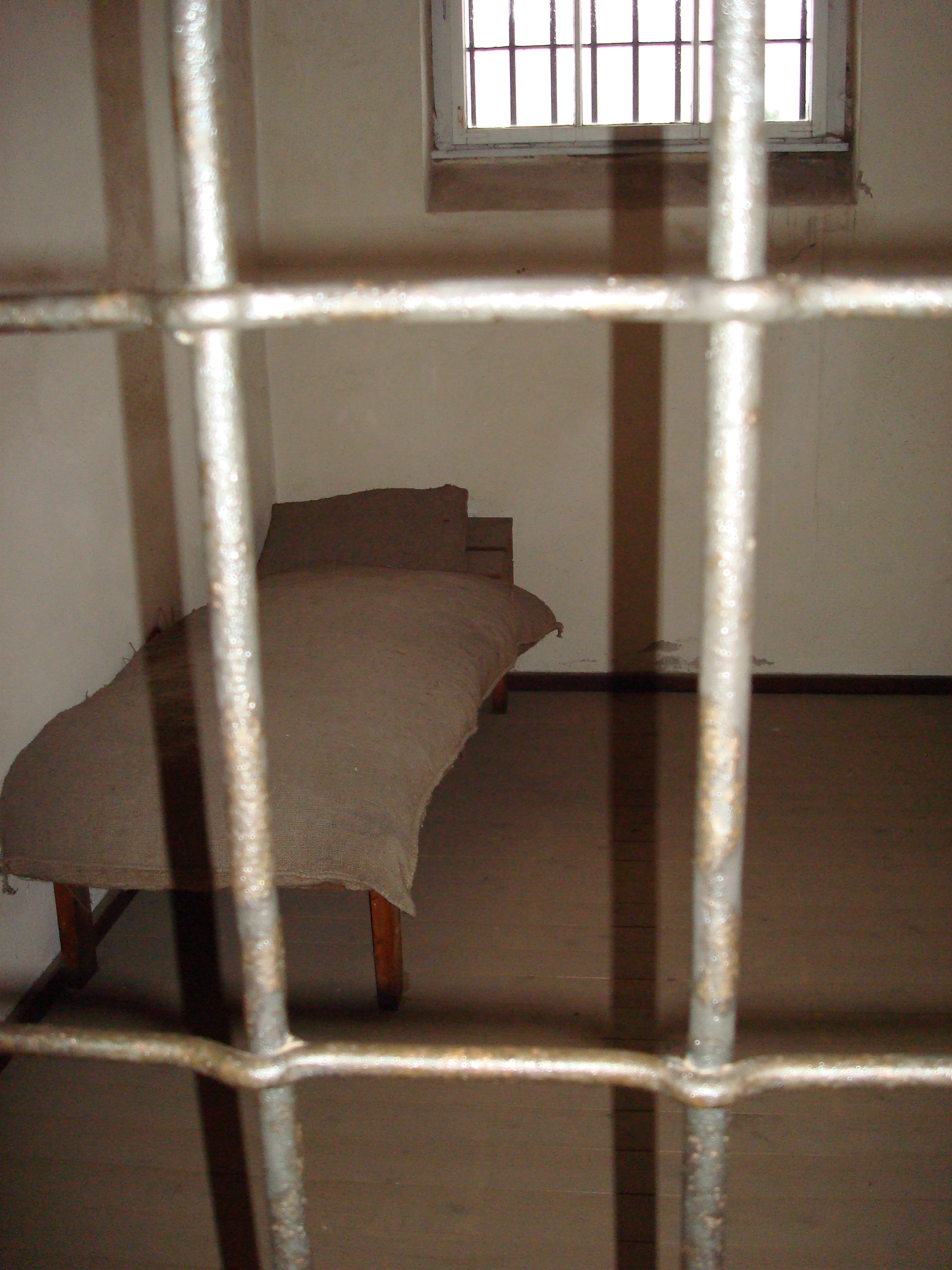
Sachsenhausen jail cell

Kurt Eccarius (5 March 1905 – 9 October 1984) was an SS functionary during the Nazi era; he was in charge of the prison block inside the Sachsenhausen concentration camp from 1939 to 1945. He was convicted by both Soviet and West German courts for murders committed during his concentration camp service.

Eccarius was born in Coburg, Saxe-Coburg and Gotha.

== Conviction by Soviet tribunal ==
Eccarius was arrested by the British and then handed over to the Soviet authorities. He was tried in 1947 by a Soviets tribunal at the Berlin Pankow city hall along with another SS guard and Sachsenhausen record keeper, Gustav Sorge, the last Sachsenhausen commandant, Anton Kaindl, eleven other SS commanders, one civil servant and two prisoner Kapos including Paul Sakowski, who served as the crematorium foreman and camp hangman from 1941 to 1943.

Eccarius was found guilty on 31 October 1947 and was sentenced to life imprisonment at the Vorkuta forced labour camp in the Gulag. He served nine years before being repatriated to West Germany in 1956.

== Criminal convictions in West Germany ==
Upon arrival in West Germany, Eccarius initially received amnesty. In 1962, he was indicted for the shooting of prisoners near Wittstock, Germany, while on a death march from Sachsenhausen north-west to Crivitz, Germany. This march began on 21 April 1945, one day before the camp was liberated by the Soviet Army. He was found guilty on 30 November 1962, in the Federal District Court in Coburg, West Germany and sentenced to four years.

Additional criminal charges were filed against Eccarius in 1962 for complicity in the killing of over 13,000 Soviet prisoners in the "Genickschussanlage" (neck shooting facility) in 1941. The trial was held in the Federal District Court of Munich, where he was found guilty and sentenced to eight and a half years' imprisonment on 22 December 1969. He was released after serving two years. He was also investigated for the murder of Yakov Dzhugashvili, son of Josef Stalin.
