= Lieberose =

- Town
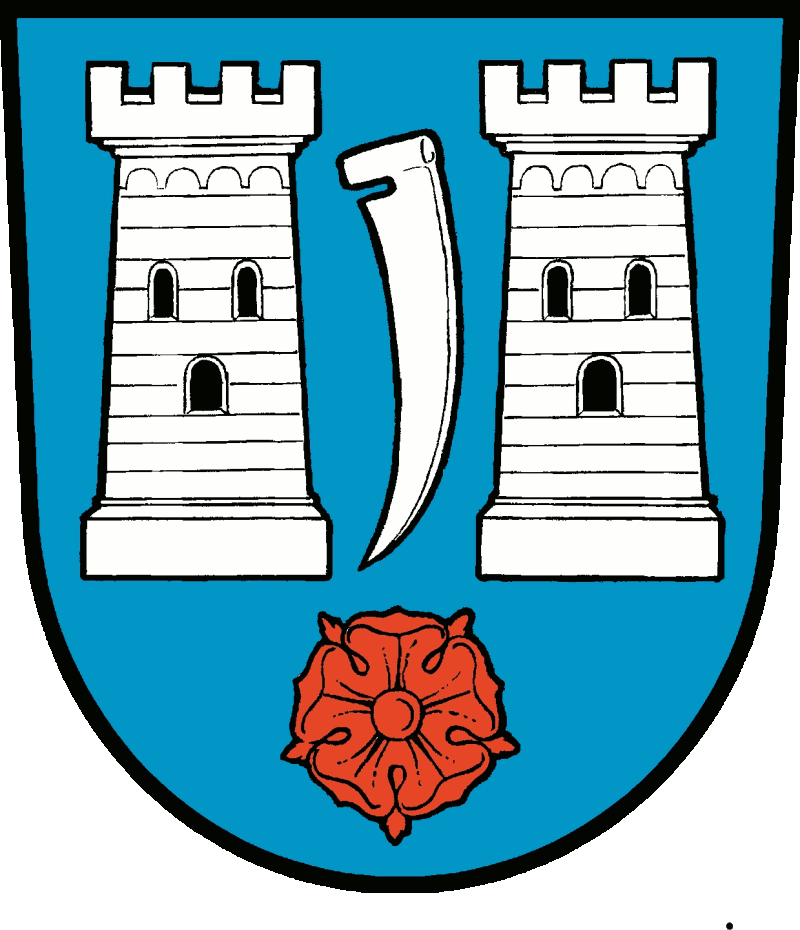
- Coat of arms

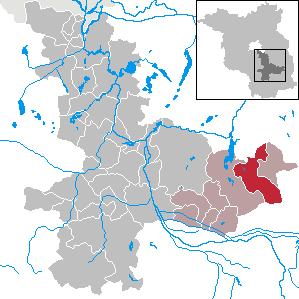
- Location of Lieberose within Dahme-Spreewald district
- Interactive map of Lieberose
- Location within Germany Location within Brandenburg
- Coordinates: 51°58′59″N 14°18′00″E
- Country: Germany
- State: Brandenburg
- District: Dahme-Spreewald
- Municipal assoc.: Lieberose/Oberspreewald
- Subdivisions: 5 Ortsteile

Government
  - Mayor (2024–29): Kerstin Michelchen

Area
  - Total: 72.51 km^{2} (28.00 sq mi)
- Elevation: 50 m (160 ft)

Population (2025-12-31)
  - Total: 1,301
  - Density: 17.94/km^{2} (46.47/sq mi)
- Time zone: UTC+01:00 (CET)
  - Summer (DST): UTC+02:00 (CEST)
- Postal codes: 15868
- Dialling codes: 033671
- Vehicle registration: LDS
- Website: www.amt-lieberose-oberspreewald.de

Lieberose (Lower Sorbian: Luboraz) is a town in the Dahme-Spreewald district, in Brandenburg, Germany. It is situated 25 km north of Cottbus.

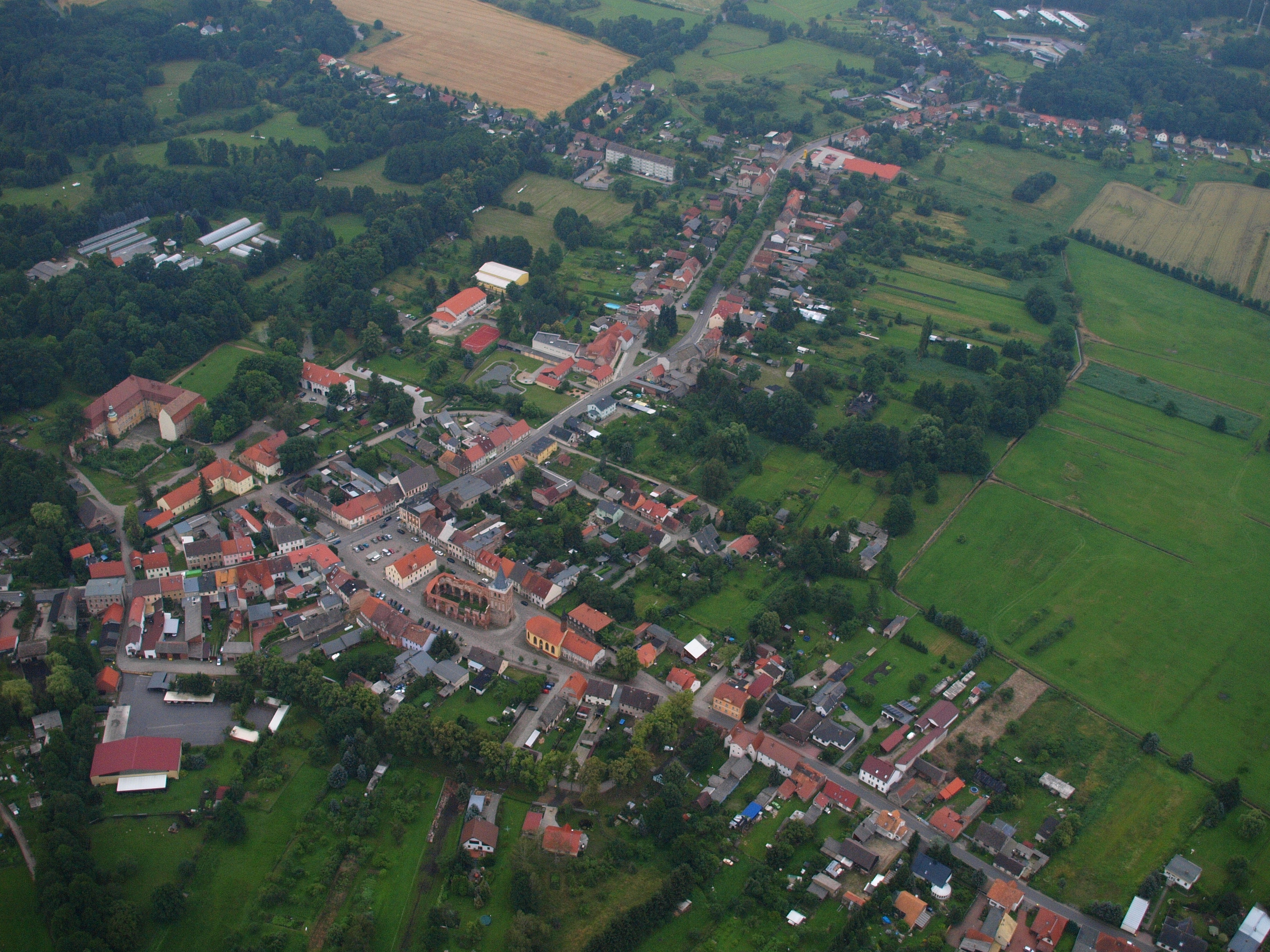
Lieberose, Aerial view

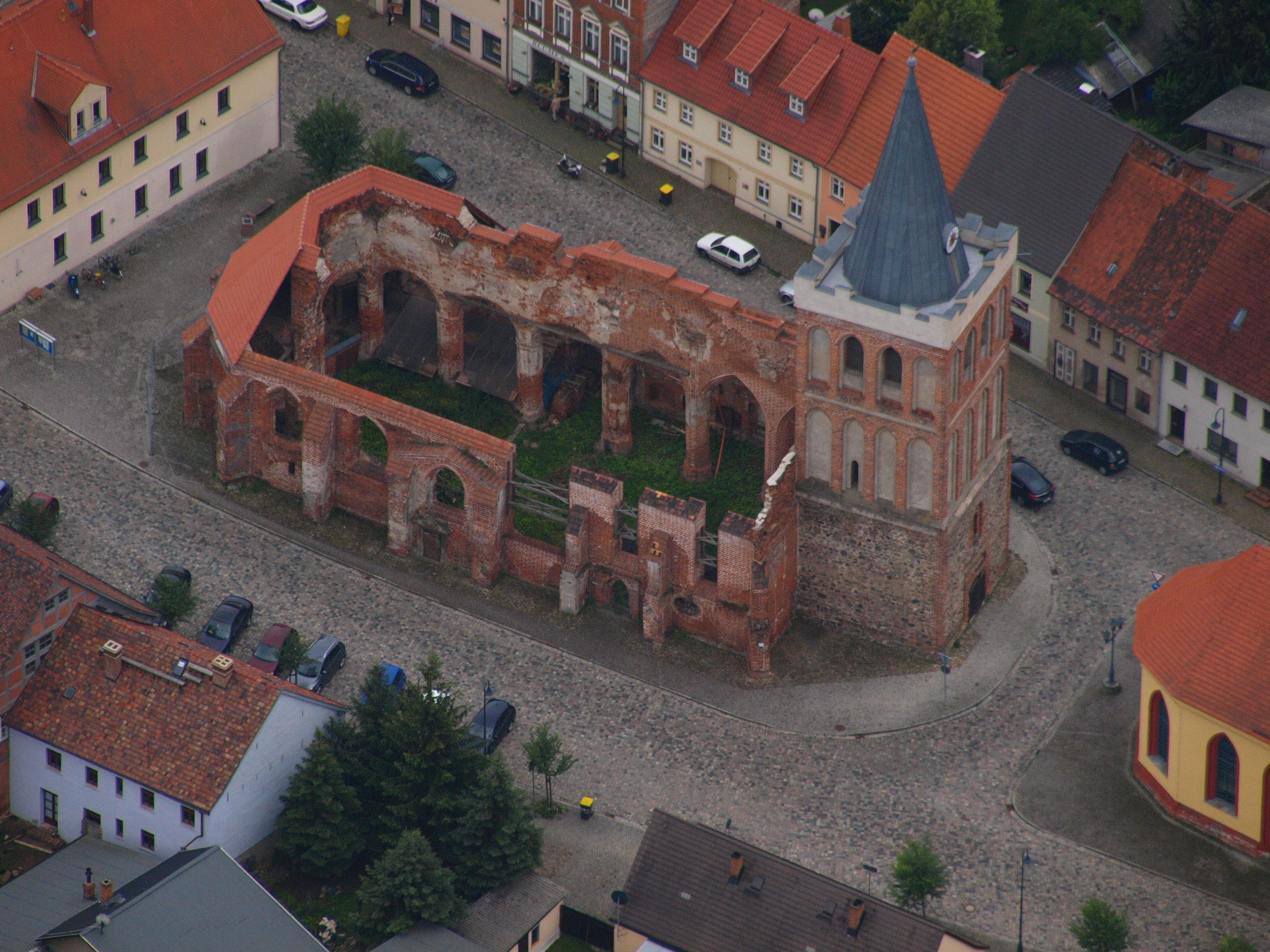
Lieberose, Church

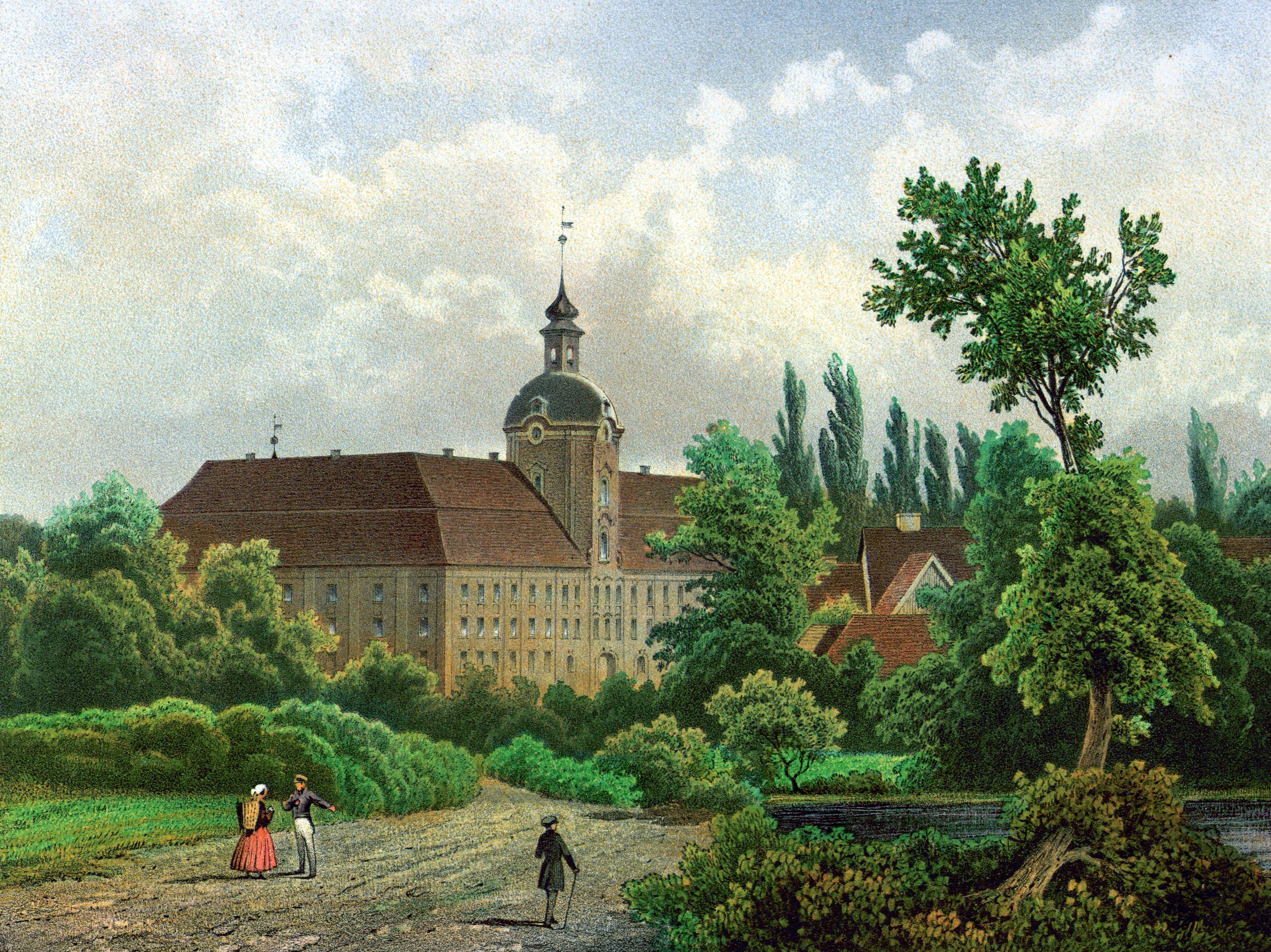
Castle Lieberose, around 1861/62, Edition by Alexander Duncker

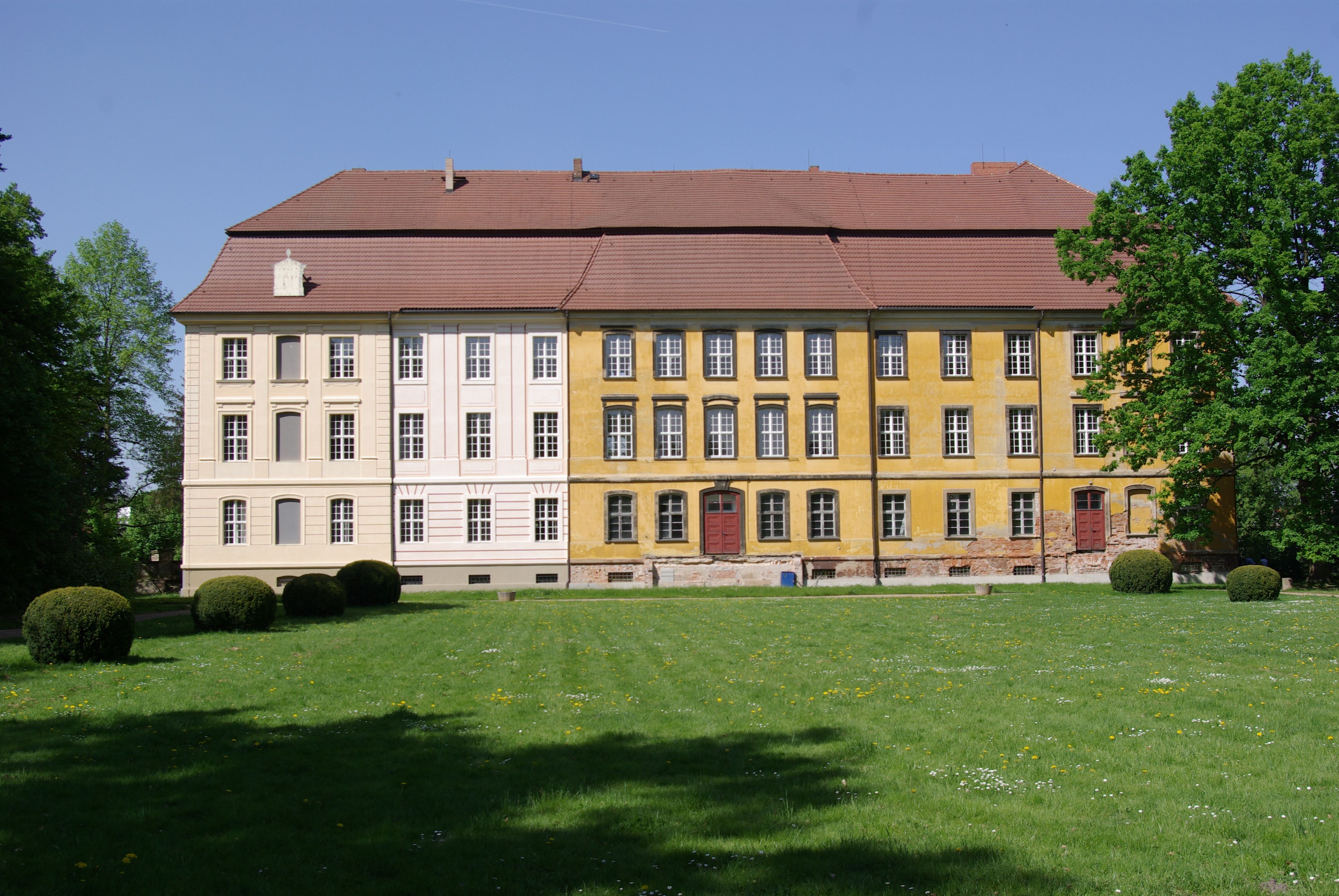
Castle Lieberose

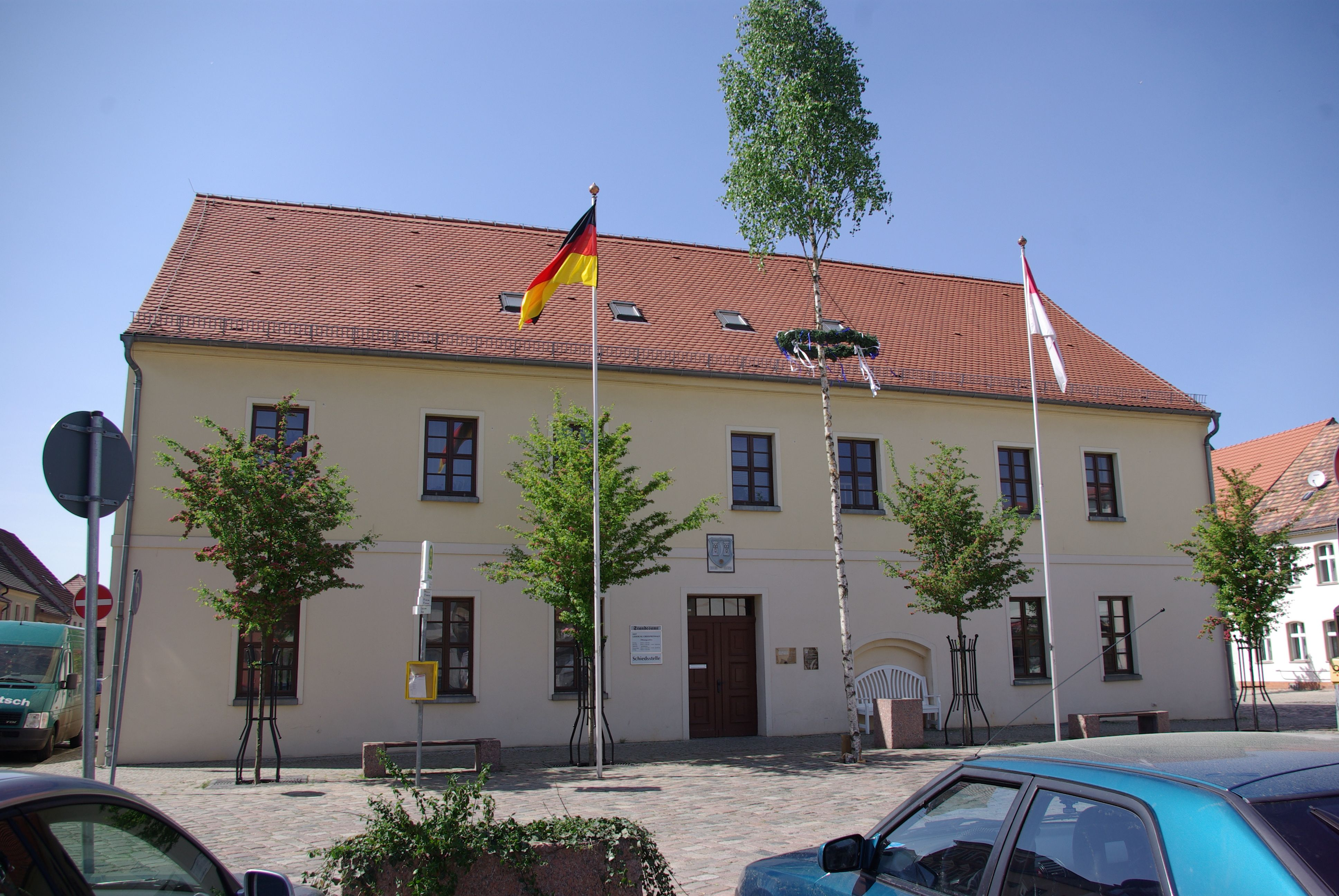
Town hall

== History ==
From 1815 to 1947, Lieberose was part of the Prussian Province of Brandenburg.

During World War II, Lieberose forced labor camp, a subcamp of Sachsenhausen concentration camp was located here. (The subcamp, KL Lieberose, was a labour camp for the support point of SS- Division "Kurmark". The SS- Division "Kurmark" located in Lieberose and surrounding area.

Near the end of the war, Jewish prisoners were sent on a death march towards Sachsenhausen.

After World War II was the camp a prison camp for the soviet secret service (NKGB).

After World War II, Lieberose was incorporated into the State of Brandenburg from 1947 to 1952 and the Bezirk Frankfurt of East Germany from 1952 to 1990. Since 1990, Lieberose is again part of Brandenburg.

== Demography ==
Development of population since 1875 within the current boundaries (Blue line: Population; Dotted line: Comparison to population development of Brandenburg state; Grey background: Time of Nazi rule; Red background: Time of communist rule)

Lieberose: Population development
within the current boundaries (2017)

Year	Pop.	±% p.a.
1875	2,919	—
1890	2,712	−0.49%
1910	2,576	−0.26%
1925	2,415	−0.43%
1933	2,411	−0.02%
1939	2,261	−1.06%
1946	3,330	+5.69%
1950	3,244	−0.65%
1964	2,495	−1.86%
1971	2,396	−0.58%
1981	2,068	−1.46%
1985	2,017	−0.62%
1989	2,006	−0.14%
1990	1,970	−1.79%

Year	Pop.	±% p.a.
1991	1,939	−1.57%
1992	1,892	−2.42%
1993	1,880	−0.63%
1994	1,864	−0.85%
1995	1,832	−1.72%
1996	1,823	−0.49%
1997	1,796	−1.48%
1998	1,809	+0.72%
1999	1,793	−0.88%
2000	1,770	−1.28%
2001	1,707	−3.56%
2002	1,664	−2.52%
2003	1,651	−0.78%
2004	1,611	−2.42%

Year	Pop.	±% p.a.
2005	1,613	+0.12%
2006	1,573	−2.48%
2007	1,534	−2.48%
2008	1,514	−1.30%
2009	1,503	−0.73%
2010	1,485	−1.20%
2011	1,472	−0.88%
2012	1,417	−3.74%
2013	1,416	−0.07%
2014	1,391	−1.77%
2015	1,379	−0.86%
2016	1,360	−1.38%
2017	1,379	+1.40%

== People from Lieberose ==
- Dietrich von der Schulenburg (1849-1911), German politician and member of Prussian parliament

== See also ==
- Lieberose forced labor camp
- Lieberose Photovoltaic Park
