= Lieberose forced labor camp =

Sub-camp of Sachsenhausen concentration camp (1943–1945)

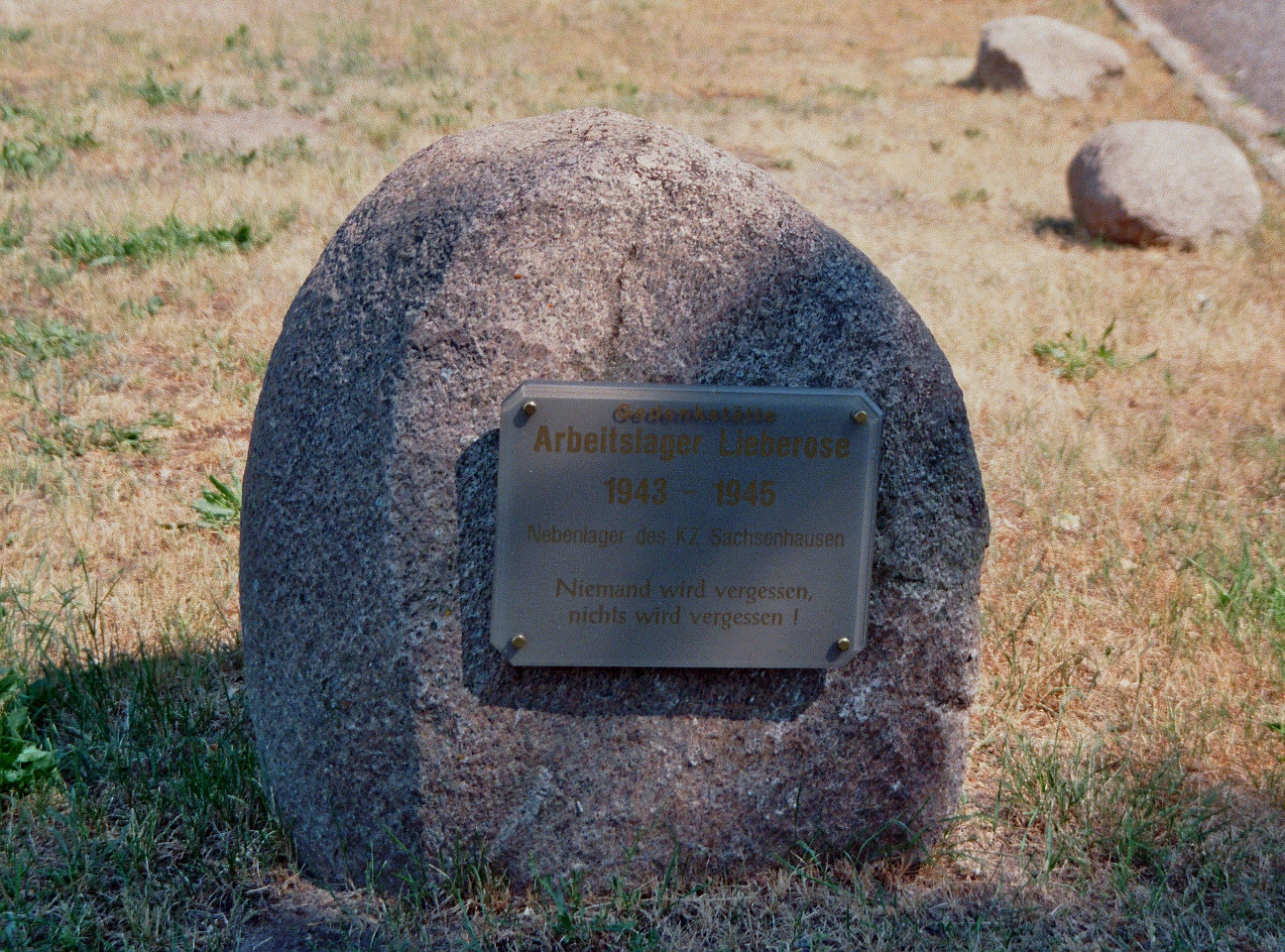
Memorial to the victims of Lieberose forced labor camp

The Lieberose forced labor camp was a Nazi forced labor camp situated near the village of Lieberose in Brandenburg, Germany. It was a subcamp of Sachsenhausen concentration camp, erected in the autumn of 1943 on the pretext of using slave labourers to construct a training ground for the Waffen-SS known as the 'Kurmark.'

This was considered by the NS-Regime as extremely important since the reverses at the front signified a new ideological grit and determination to defend the bastion of the Fatherland. The SS-training ground, together with a barrack complex known as "Ullersdorf," were among several enforced labour projects. The workforce was incarcerated in a camp just outside the village of Lieberose, which lies around 40 km from Cottbus.

The initial prisoners of the camp were of a mixed European background, some of whom were Jews, and were categorized according to a red triangular symbol stitched over the left breast into their clothing. As in common with most concentration camp victims the slave labourers had their hair shaved off and had to wear a striped pyjama style uniform. They wore wooden clogs on their feet, the soles of which were subjected to vicious sores and infections particularly in winter. Those who could no longer work were taken off into the woods and executed with a shot to the back of the head.

On the 5 June, 1944, the situation radically changed with the arrival of the first transport of Hungarian Jews that had been sent on from Auschwitz. A connecting branch line from Beeskow to Lieberose ensured the rapid transportation of human cargo by rail. In all 2, 432 Hungarian Jews were delivered, thereby altering the composition of the work camp so that it became predominantly 90% Jewish.

The slave labourers had in addition to their other duties to carry out backbreaking work in a quarry. The ordeal was so overwhelming that many died. Among the victims was the entire male component of one Hungarian Jewish family, including the father and his sons, namely: Abraham Kaufmann (1897-1945) Sandor Kaufmann (1925-1945) Zoltan Kaufmann (1927-1945) André Kaufmann (1928-1945).

Others among the dead included Tadeusz Smolarczyk (1904-1944) from Poland and Siegmund Sredzki (1892-1944) from Germany. This reflects the difference in age and nationality between some of the imprisoned men. The fact that Sredzki, a German national of Polish origin, had been imprisoned reaffirms the political nature behind some of the prisoners that had been forcibly conscripted.

A French political prisoner Claude René Roudaire survived to report over the meagre food rations. Each prisoner was responsible for his own spoon, cup and bowl. Roudaire reports how "in the mornings one received murky brown coffee" (*Ersatzkaffee). Each man could take his portion from a daily amount of around 100g of bread and one litre of watery cabbage or carrot and turnip soup, the quality of which was diabolical and insufficient for one's vitamin intake.

Indeed, Lieberose workcamp was founded upon the expressed command of the local SS, police and NSDAP authorities. The official party newspaper for the local region or 'Gau,' denoting a part of the province of Brandenburg, contained a copy of an official address made by the regional 'Gauleiter' (the provincial party and local administrator). He called upon the local population in the Führer's name for the communal support of the Lieberose work camp and of its prioritised projects.

This means there was community and neighbourhood awareness among ordinary Germans of what went on in the camp. They would have gained some knowledge of the deplorable and deathly conditions. No one could say based on this evidence that they didn't know of the essence of the true circumstances. The NSDAP Gauleiter addressed community leaders of the local small towns and villages, including Lübbinchen, Pinnow, Schönhöhe, Staakow, Jamlitz, Blasdorf, Mochlitz, Leeskow, Ullersdorf and many other regional communities.

The local inhabitants would also have witnessed the infamous death marches that occurred as the victorious Red Army approached from the East. The SS decided that the Lieberose work camp had to be folded up. No evidence of slave labour and criminality was supposed to fall into the hands of the Allies. Those that had been 'selected' and were murdered had their corpses concealed in mass graves.

The 'evacuation' of the camp occurred in early 1945 on the command of the SS. The historian Dr Andreas Weigelt writes of mass-murder as hundreds died unable to keep up with the drastic tempo of the enforced marches (See 'Dachauer Hefte, 20 (2004), pp. 179-193). He reports how 1300 slave labourers, ill-nourished and unable to work, were murdered by the SS within the grounds of the camp. The remaining 1600 prisoners were marched off between 2 and 10 February, 1945 back towards the main concentration camp (Stammlager) of Sachsenhausen.

The maltreated men were at some stages along the journey transported by rail in whatever freight waggons were available. Conditions were cramped; the imprisoned often bereft of air and water. Such was their thirst. There were insufficient rations. Many died. Due to trains being prioritised for other purposes or as a result of damaged lines through Allied bombing the prisoners had to mostly march on in their inappropriate wooden cloggs that contributed to sores and wounds.

The Norwegian political prisoner and pacifist Odd Nansen (1901-1973), son of the polar-regional explorer Fridtjof Nansen (1861-1930), writes of his experiences in Lieberose and of the death march he was subjected to (See Odd Nansen, Von Tag zu Tag, Hamburg, 1949). He writes of "half-dead skeletal men" and of their SS overseers promising them "the crematorium." Such was the cynicism of the SS well-endowed with their sadistic ways.

When the bedraggled column from Lieberose reached Sachsenhausen most of the men were close to physical collapse. There was no reward for their journey. Instead there followed more 'selections' and many hundreds were executed in the main industrial courtyard ('Industriehof') of Sachsenhausen.

One of the mass graves, containing the bodies of 1300 victims, murdered by the Nazis, has been found near the site of the camp. Local farmers chanced upon the grave in 1971 during some work assigned for irrigation. The revelation caused horror and sensation. The local DDR delegates commissioned a memorial-site.

The bodies of the dead were unearthed and cremated and symbollically revered in a communal urn. Its appearance adorns the 'heroic concept' of martyrdom the Communist authorities at the time aspired to. Engraved reliefs show images of persecuted men who refuse through their solidarity not to buckle while their persecutors gleefully look on with their guard dogs straining at the leash.

The mass grave of 1300 victims is believed to be the largest mass grave within Germany - in other words an example of mass-murder that wasn't within a concentration camp. The complicity of the local population, of parish counsellers and of prominent personalities in the local economy raises ethical and moral issues as to why no one intervened or showed pity for those maltreated. The resulting passivity and turning away reaffirmed the authority of the NS-Regime even in its dying days.

== See also ==
- Klinkerwerk, another subcamp of Sachsenhausen
