= Claude Cumberlege =

Royal Navy officer

Rear-Admiral Claude Cumberlege
- Born: 9 June 1877; Marylebone, England
- Died: 2 November 1962 (aged 85)
- Relatives: Lieutenant Commander Mike Cumberlege (son)
- Military career
- Allegiance: United Kingdom
- Branch: Royal Navy
- Service years: 1891–1922
- Rank: Rear-Admiral
- Commands: HMAS Melbourne (1920–21); HMAS Australia (1919–20); HMAS Brisbane (1916–19); HMAS Encounter (1916); HMAS Warrego (1913–16); HMS Lurcher (1912–13); HMS Fury (1912); HMS Kale (1911–12); HMS Speedy (1911); HMS Hussar (1908–10); HMS Albatross (1906–08); HMS Locust (1905–06)
- Conflicts: First World War; Asian and Pacific theatre; Battle of Bita Paka
- Awards: Mentioned in Despatches

Rear-Admiral Claude Lionel Cumberlege (9 June 1877 – 2 November 1962) was a senior Royal Navy officer who was seconded to the Royal Australian Navy during the First World War.

A son was Lieutenant Commander Mike Cumberlege, who was killed by the Germans toward the end of the Second World War.
