= Gustav Sorge =

German SS officer and war criminal (1911–1978)

Personal details
- Born: 24 April 1911 German Empire
- Died: 3 October 1978 (aged 67) Bochum Prison, West Germany
- SS paramilitary career
- Allegiance: Nazi Germany
- Branch: Death's Head Units (Totenkopfverbände)
- Rank: Master sergeant (Hauptscharführer)

Gustav Hermann Sorge (24 April 1911 – 3 October 1978), nicknamed "Der eiserne Gustav" ("Iron Gustav") for his brutality, was an SS senior NCO (Hauptscharführer). He was initially a guard at Esterwegen concentration camp in the Emsland region of Germany. Later on, he was assigned to the Sachsenhausen concentration camp.

== Career ==
Among the many people who were murdered at Sachsenhausen by Sorge was Leon Sternbach, a professor of classical philology at the Jagiellonian University and the paternal uncle of famed chemist, Leo Sternbach. Sorge became a prisoner of war of the USSR after the war. He was tried as a war criminal by the Soviet Union in the Sachsenhausen trial held in the former city hall of Berlin-Pankow in 1947, along with Sachsenhausen commandant, Anton Kaindl, prison block director, Kurt Eccarius and others. He was convicted and sentenced to life imprisonment.

== Retrial ==
Sorge was repatriated to West Germany in 1956 on the condition that he continue to serve the life sentence imposed by the Soviets. He was put on trial with fellow SS guard, Wilhelm Schubert, in Bonn for the 1941 murders of over 13,000 Soviet prisoners of war, many of whom were invalided, at Sachsenhausen concentration camp. The murders were carried out on a daily basis for six weeks. The retrial was ordered by the Federal Ministry of Justice of Germany to assuage public concern that the original verdicts in 1947 were indeed warranted. He was convicted of 67 individual murders and numerous counts of manslaughter and re-sentenced to a life term. He was sent to Rheinbach prison near Bonn, where he died in 1978.

== See also ==
- Martin Sommer
