= Genickschussanlage =

Facility used for surprise executions in Nazi Germany

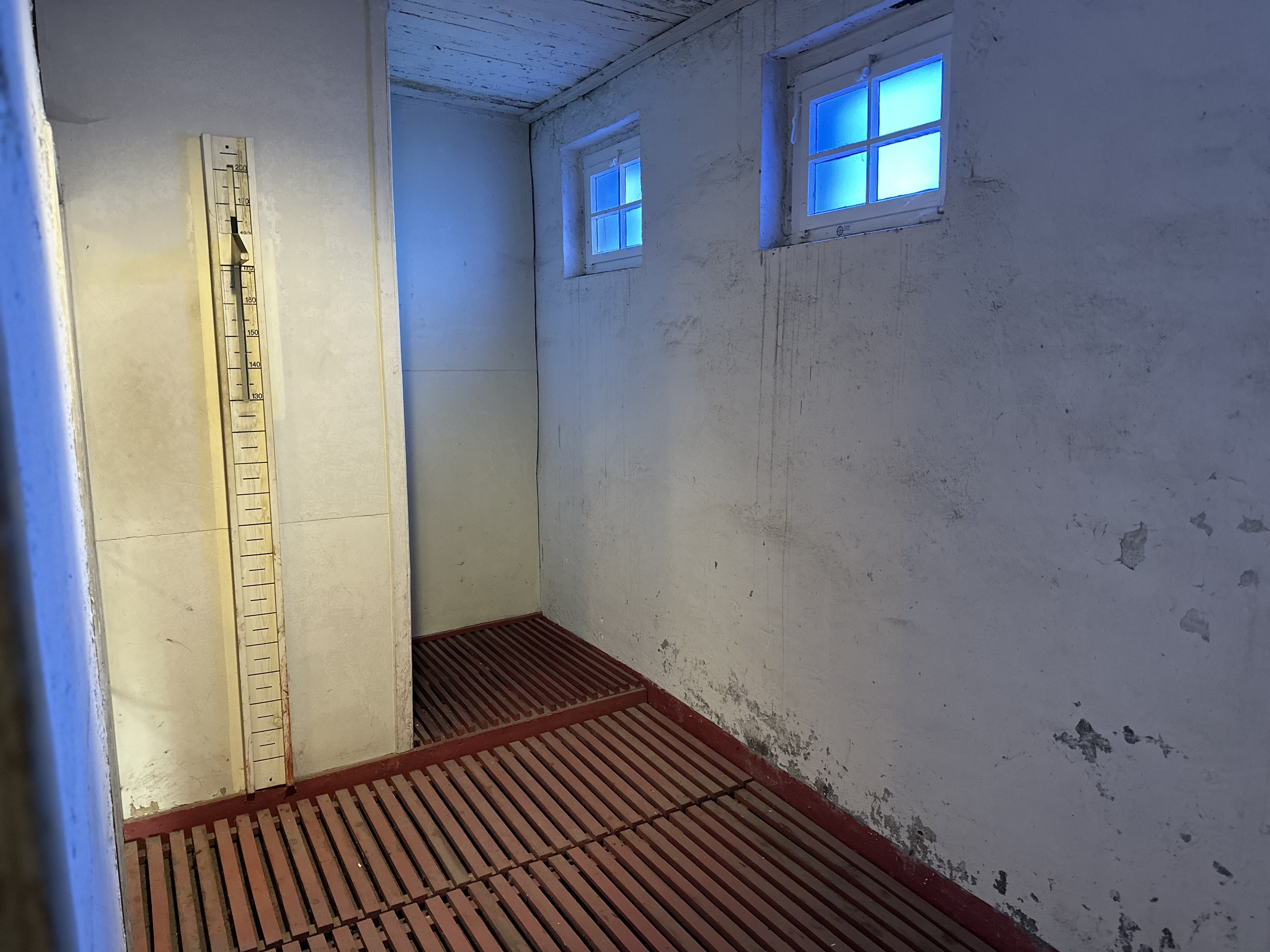
The execution facility at the Buchenwald concentration camp.

Genickschussanlage (German for "neck shooting facility") is the official name of a facility used for surprise executions in Nazi Germany. The victim was placed, under the pretext of a medical examination, in a position where a shot could be fired into the back of their neck from the neighbouring room. For that purpose, the facilities were partly disguised as height measuring devices or medicinal instruments. The facilities are mostly known from concentration camps (such as Sachsenhausen), where they were not only used to carry out official death sentences but also to carry out inconspicuous murder of larger groups of victims. (Citation needed)

== In the Buchenwald concentration camp ==
In the Buchenwald concentration camp, after 1941, the facility was mostly used to execute Soviet prisoners of war. (This citation does not support this claim) These prisoners, who were brought to the camp from other concentration camps, were placed in a former horse stable converted to a rudimentary medical examination room under the pretext of a medical examination. Soviet prisoners of war were then placed in front of the measuring device on the wall; during the "measuring", they were executed by shooting them in the back of the neck through a specially created hole in the wall. The floor was coloured brown to conceal the blood to new prisoners.

Because the prisoners were brought for immediate execution, neither their arrival at the camp nor their death were registered in the camp's listings. The number of victims shot with the help of this device is estimated to be about 8,000.

The Kommando 99 was responsible for the device.

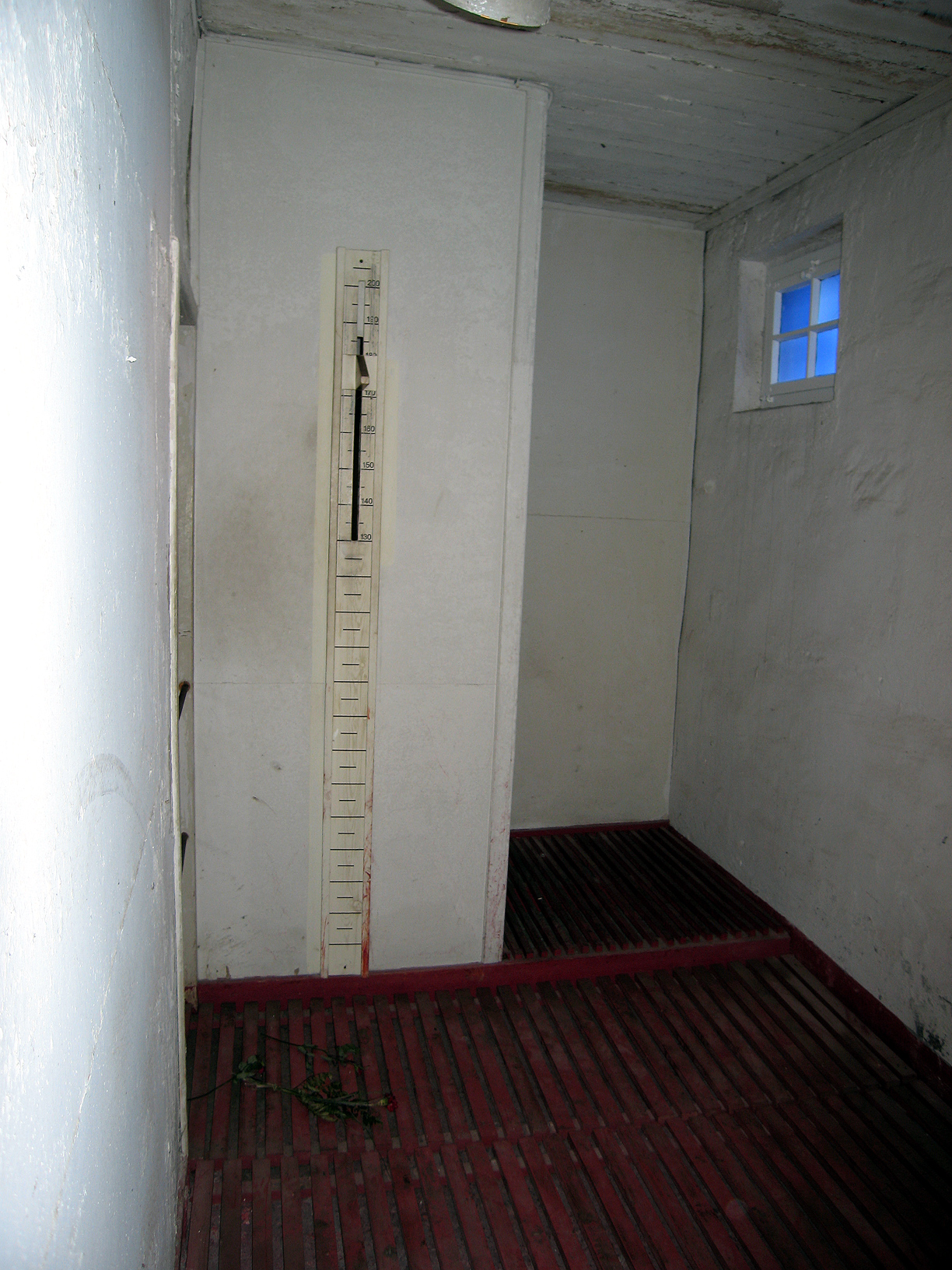
Replica of the device in Buchenwald concentration camp. The shot was fired through a hole underneath the head height measurement device.

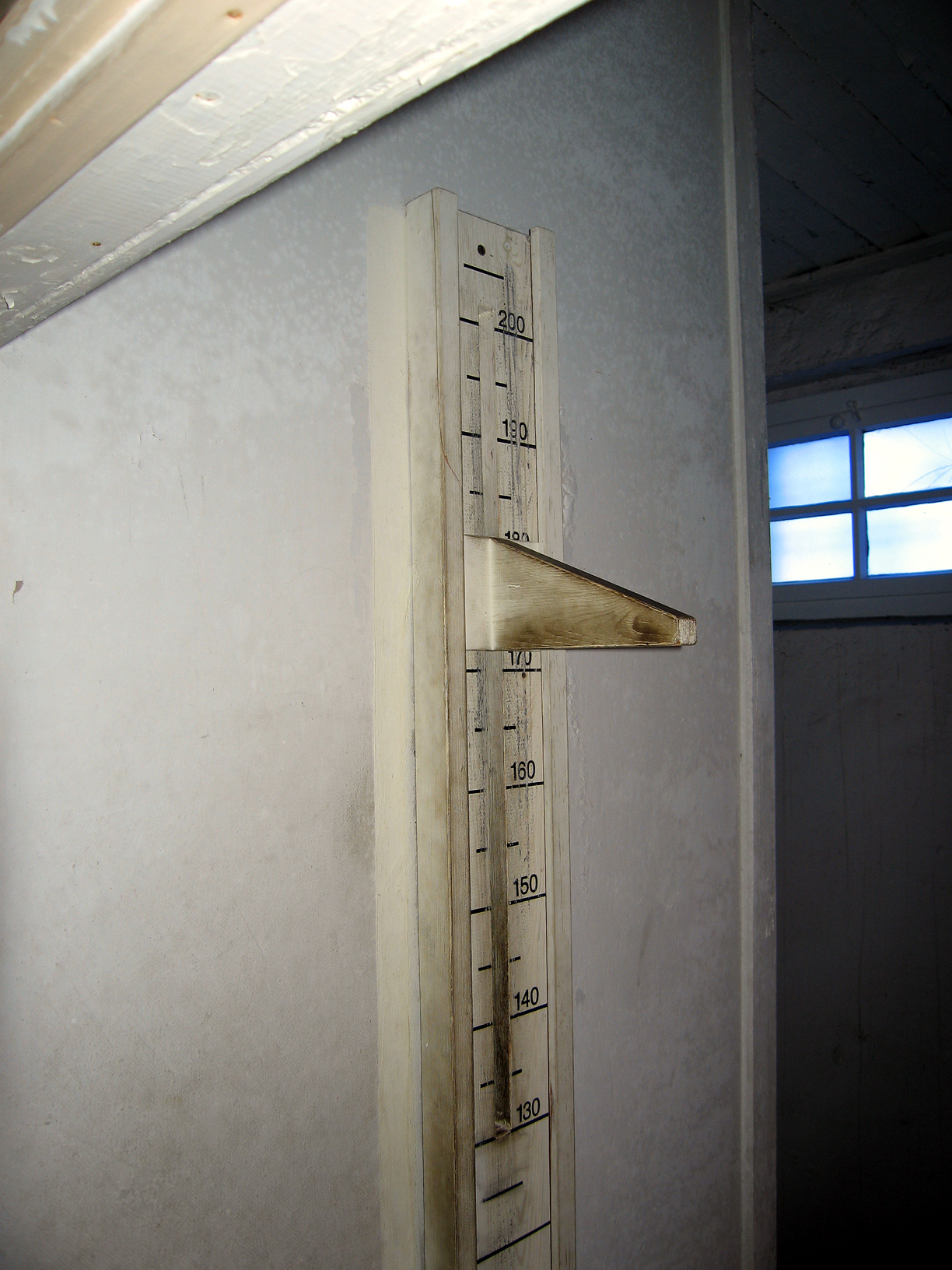
The shot was fired during the measurement of a victim's height. For that purpose, a hole was made through the measuring device.

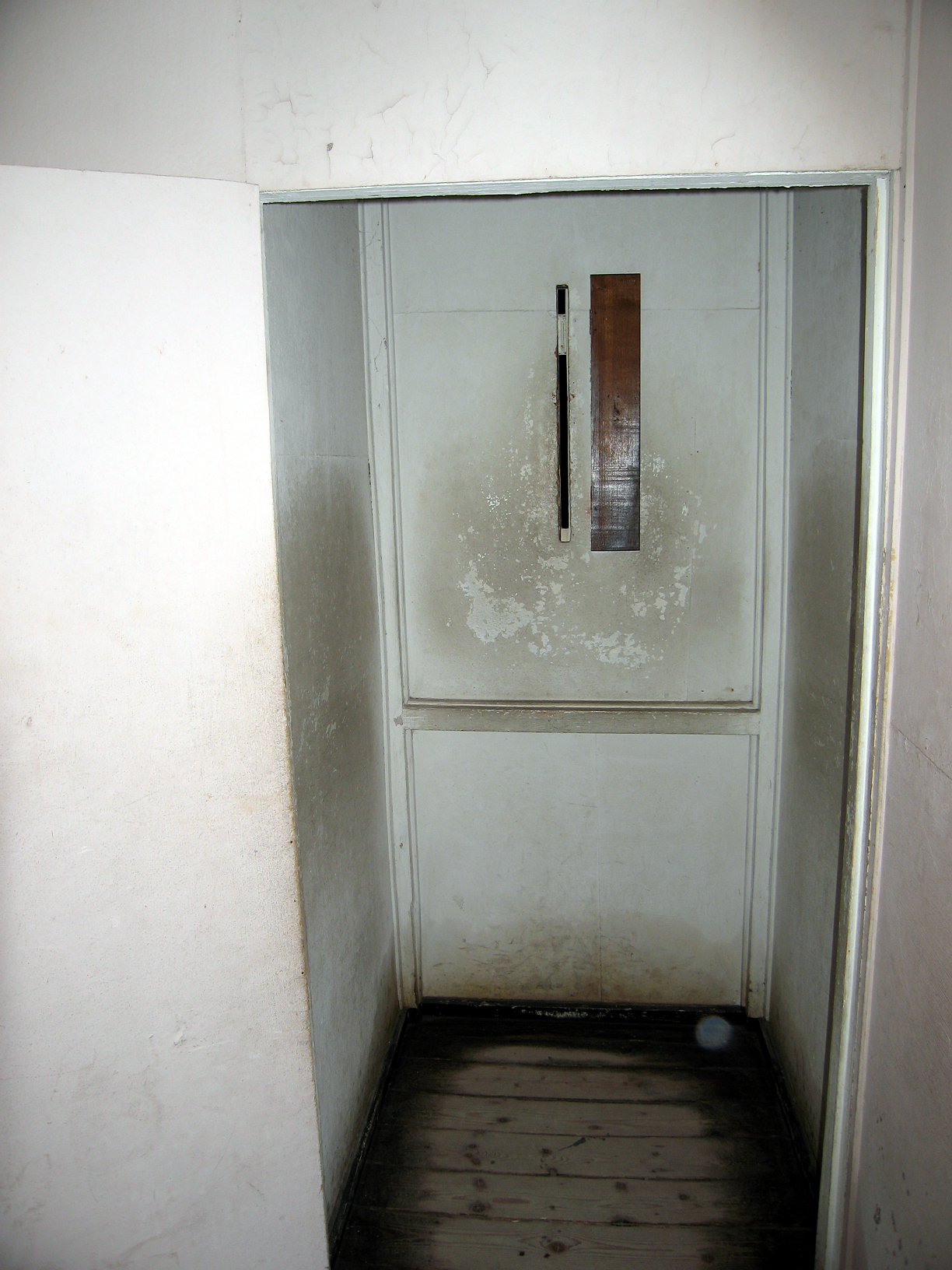
The back of the replica of the device. The location from where the shot was fired.

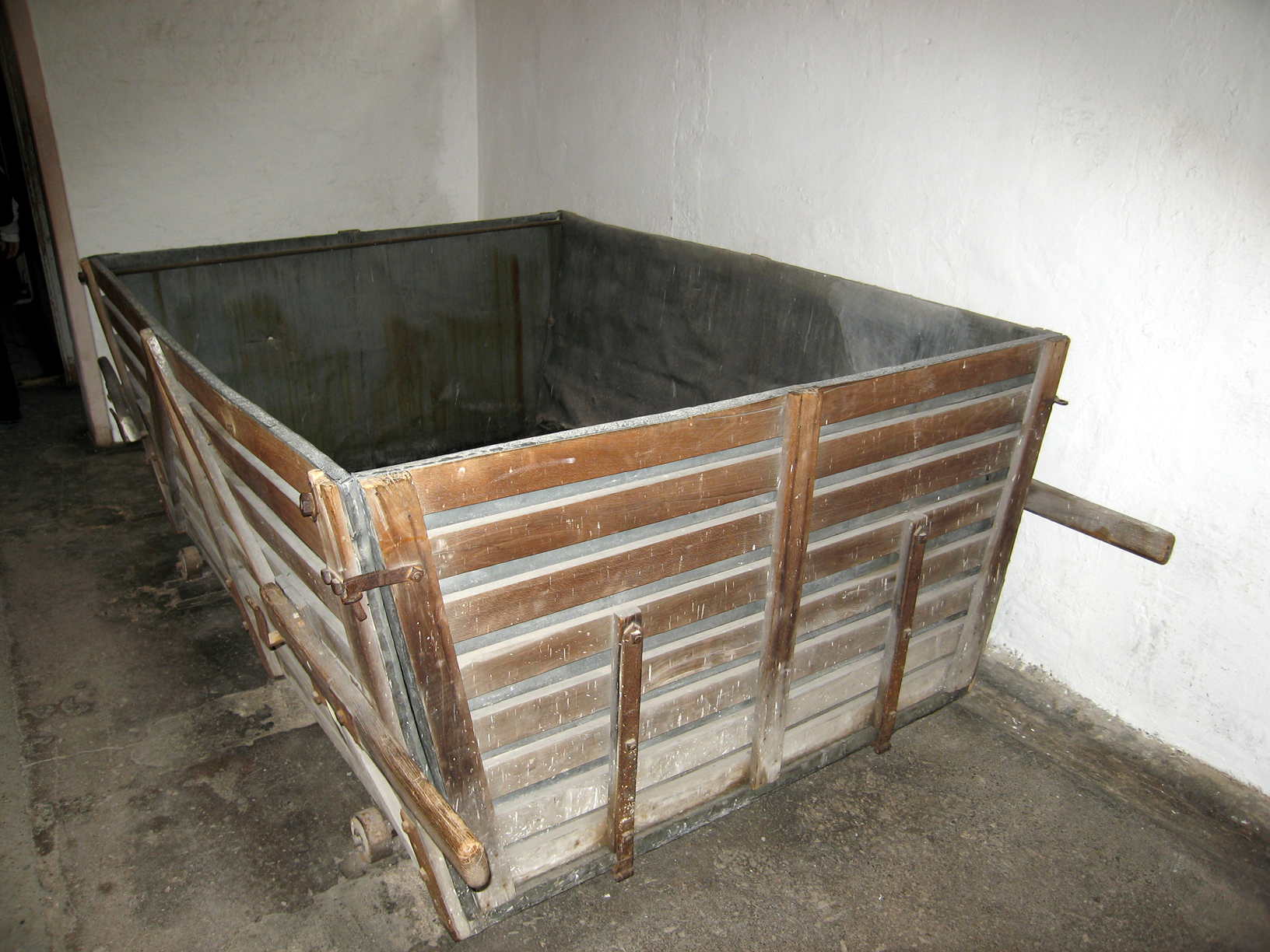
A cart to carry the bodies of the victims out of the building.
