= Anton Kaindl =

SS officer and war criminal

- Trial photograph
- Born: 14 July 1902; Munich, Kingdom of Bavaria
- Died: 31 August 1948 (aged 46); Vorkuta Gulag, Soviet Union
- Status: Deceased
- Conviction: War crimes
- Penalty: Life imprisonment with hard labour
- Military career
- Allegiance: Nazi Germany
- Branch: Schutzstaffel
- Rank: Standartenführer

Anton Kaindl (14 July 1902 – 31 August 1948) was an SS-Standartenführer and commandant of the Sachsenhausen concentration camp from 1943-1945.

Kaindl joined the army during the Weimar Republic in May 1920 and served until May 1932, leaving with the rank of sergeant. He worked briefly for a bank in the city of Donauwörth until August 1932, when he took an administrative position with the Reichskuratorium für Jugendertüchtigung (Reich Board for Youth Fitness). He joined the SS in July 1935 (SS no. 241,248) and the Nazi Party in May 1937 (party no. 4.390.500). In November 1939, he was assigned an administrative position in the SS-Totenkopf Division. He was then transferred to the administrative department of the Inspectorate of Concentration Camps headed by Richard Glücks. Kaindl's next transfer was to Sachsenhausen, where he served as commandant until the evacuation of the camp on 22 April 1945.

He was captured by the Red Army and was arraigned in the Sachsenhausen trial held by the Soviet Military Tribunal in the city hall of Pankow, Berlin in October 1947. He was charged along with Sachsenhausen record keeper, Gustav Sorge, punishment Blockführer, Kurt Eccarius, camp doctor, Heinz Baumkötter, ten other SS officers, one civil servant and two prisoner Kapos, including Paul Sakowski who served as the crematorium foreman and camp hangman from 1941 to 1943.

Kaindl was found guilty of war crimes with 11 of the others and was held in the Hohenschönhausen for a month. He was sentenced to life in prison with hard labor and sent to the Vorkuta Gulag, where he died in August 1948.

Kaindl's Military Promotions
Date	Rank
1 July 1935	SS-Untersturmführer
20 April 1936	SS-Obersturmführer
30 January 1938	SS-Sturmbannführer
30 January 1939	SS-Obersturmbannführer
9 November 1943	SS-Standartenführer
