= Sachsenhausen concentration camp =

Nazi concentration camp in Oranienburg, Germany

Sachsenhausen
- Nazi concentration camp
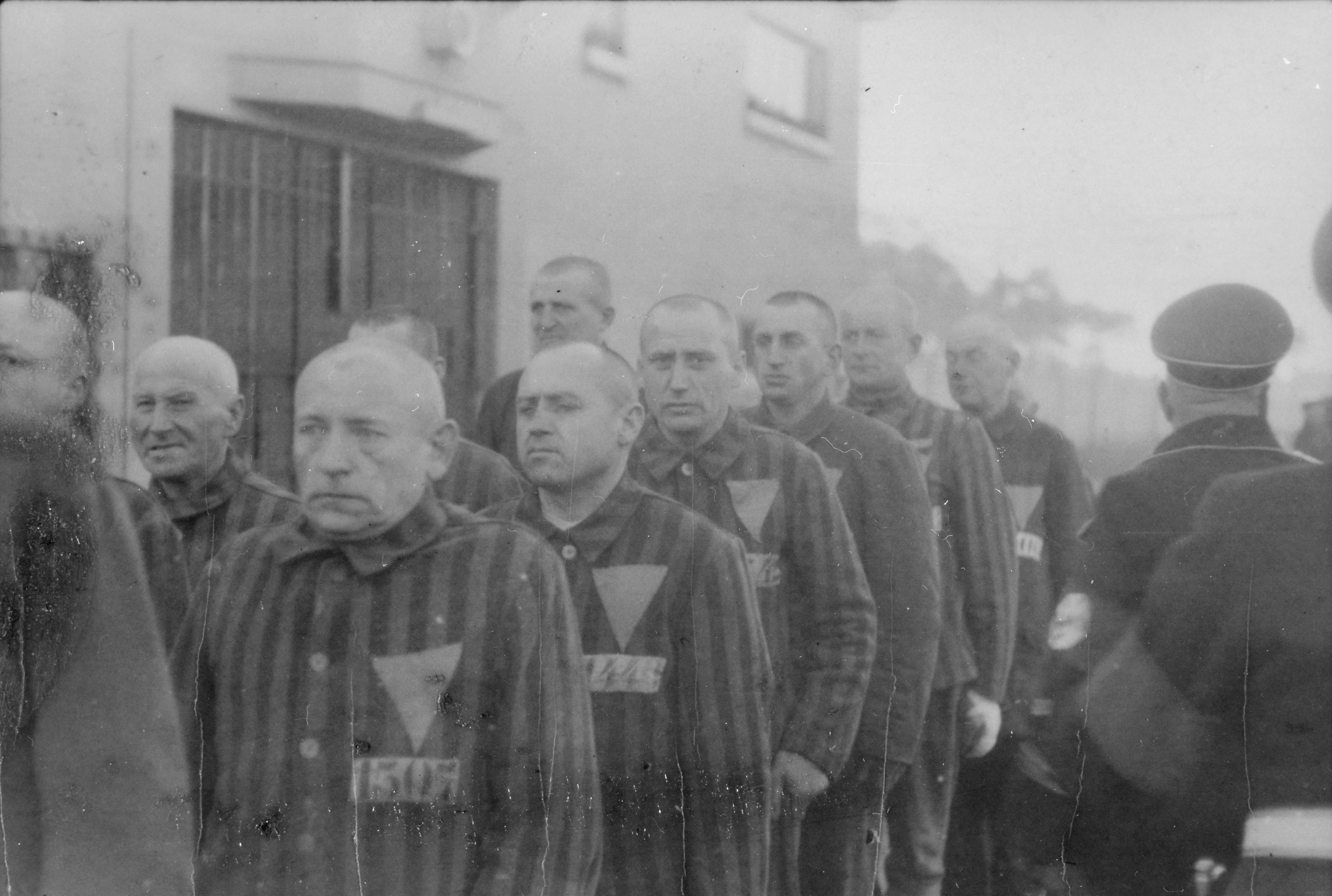
- Prisoners in the concentration camp at Sachsenhausen, Germany, 19 December 1938

- Location of Sachsenhausen within Nazi Germany in 1937
- Coordinates: 52°45′57″N 13°15′51″E
- Location: Oranienburg, Germany
- Operated by: Schutzstaffel
- Commandant: See list
- Operational: July 1936 – 22 April 1945
- Inmates: Initially German Jews and varied German citizens (divided between racial, political, "career criminal" and "antisocial" inmates), later overwhelmingly (90% by 1944) foreign forced laborers and political prisoners (mostly Polish and Soviet citizens)
- Number of inmates: More than 200,000, including around 20,000 women
- Killed: Tens of thousands, including at least 10,000 Soviet prisoners of war executed in late 1941
- Liberated by: Polish Army's 2nd Infantry Division
- Notable inmates: List of prisoners of Sachsenhausen

Sachsenhausen (German pronunciation: [zaksn̩ˈhaʊzn̩]) or Sachsenhausen-Oranienburg was a Nazi concentration camp in Oranienburg, Germany, used from 1936 until April 1945, shortly before the defeat of Nazi Germany in May. It mainly held political prisoners throughout World War II. Prominent prisoners included Joseph Stalin's oldest son, Yakov Dzhugashvili; assassin Herschel Grynszpan; Paul Reynaud, the penultimate prime minister of the French Third Republic; Francisco Largo Caballero, prime minister of the Second Spanish Republic during the Spanish Civil War; the wife and children of the crown prince of Bavaria; Ukrainian nationalist leader Stepan Bandera; and several enemy soldiers and political dissidents.

Sachsenhausen was a labour camp, outfitted with several subcamps, a gas chamber, and a medical experimentation area. Prisoners were treated inhumanely, fed inadequately, and killed openly. After World War II, when Oranienburg was in the Soviet Occupation Zone, the structure was used by the NKVD as special camp Nr. 7. Today, Sachsenhausen is open to the public as a memorial.

== Sachsenhausen under Nazi Germany ==
The camp was finished in 1936. It was located 35 kilometres (22 mi) north of Berlin, which gave it a primary position among the German concentration camps: the administrative centre of all concentration camps was located in Oranienburg, and Sachsenhausen became a training centre for Schutzstaffel (SS) officers (who would often be sent to oversee other camps afterwards). Initially, the camp was used to perfect the most efficient and effective execution method for use in the death camps. Given that, executions took place at Sachsenhausen, especially of Soviet prisoners of war.

During the earlier stages of the camp's existence, the executions were done by placing the prisoners in a small room, often even with music playing, called the Genickschussbaracke (lit. 'Shot-in-the-neck-barrack') and told they were to have their height and weight measured but were instead shot in the back of the neck through a sliding door located behind the neck. This was found to be far too time-consuming, so they then trialled a trench, killing either by shooting or by hanging. While this more easily enabled group executions, it created too much initial panic among the prisoners, making them harder to control. Then small scale trials of what would go on to become the large scale, death camp gas chambers were designed and carried out. These trials showed the authorities that this method facilitated the means to murder the largest number of prisoners without "excessive" initial panic. So by September 1941, when they were conducting the first trials of this method at Auschwitz, Sachsenhausen had already been the scene of "some gassings in conjunction with the development of gas vans".

The prisoners were also used as a workforce, with a large task force of prisoners from the camp sent to work in the nearby brickworks to meet Albert Speer's vision of rebuilding Berlin.

== Camp layout ==
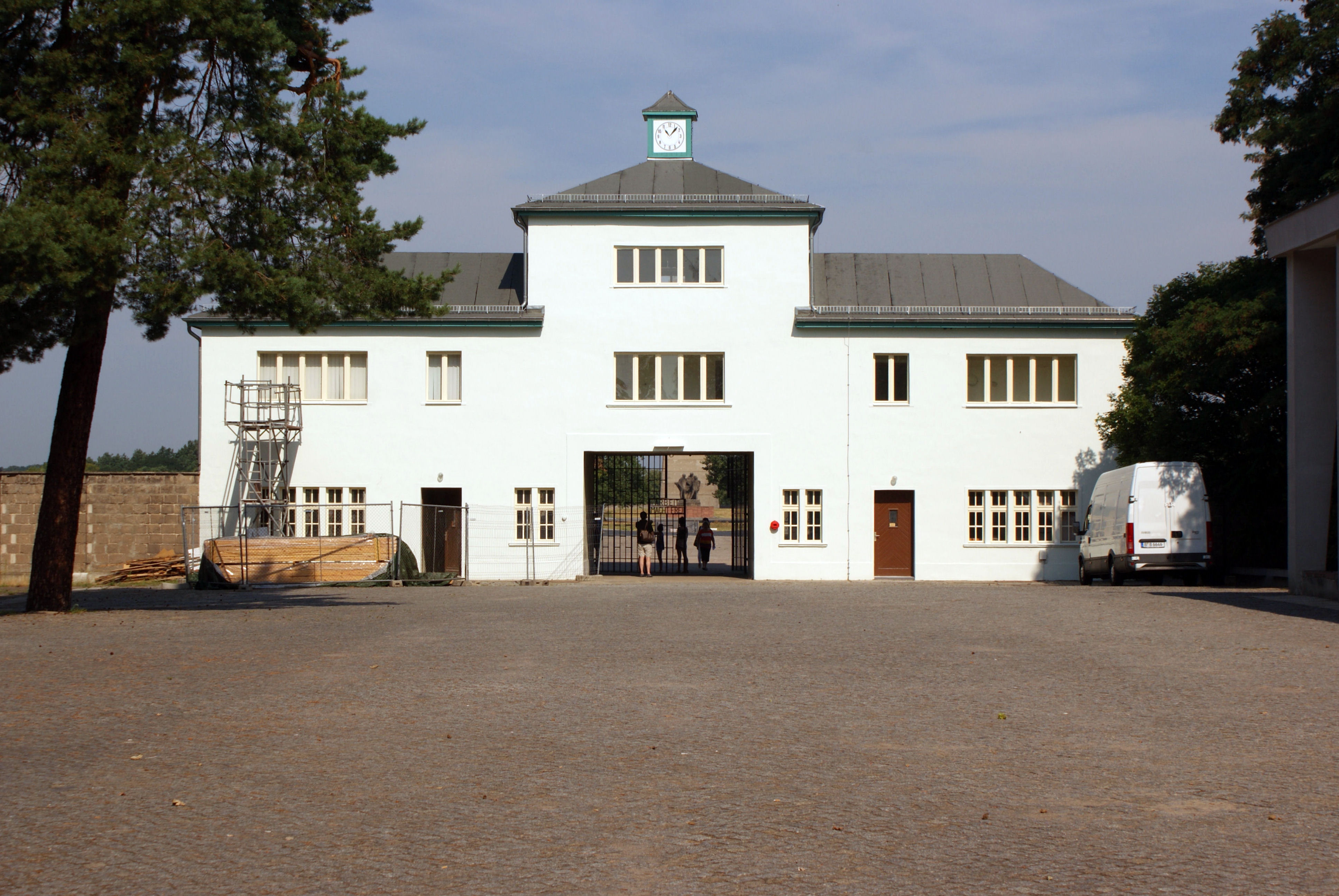
Main entrance

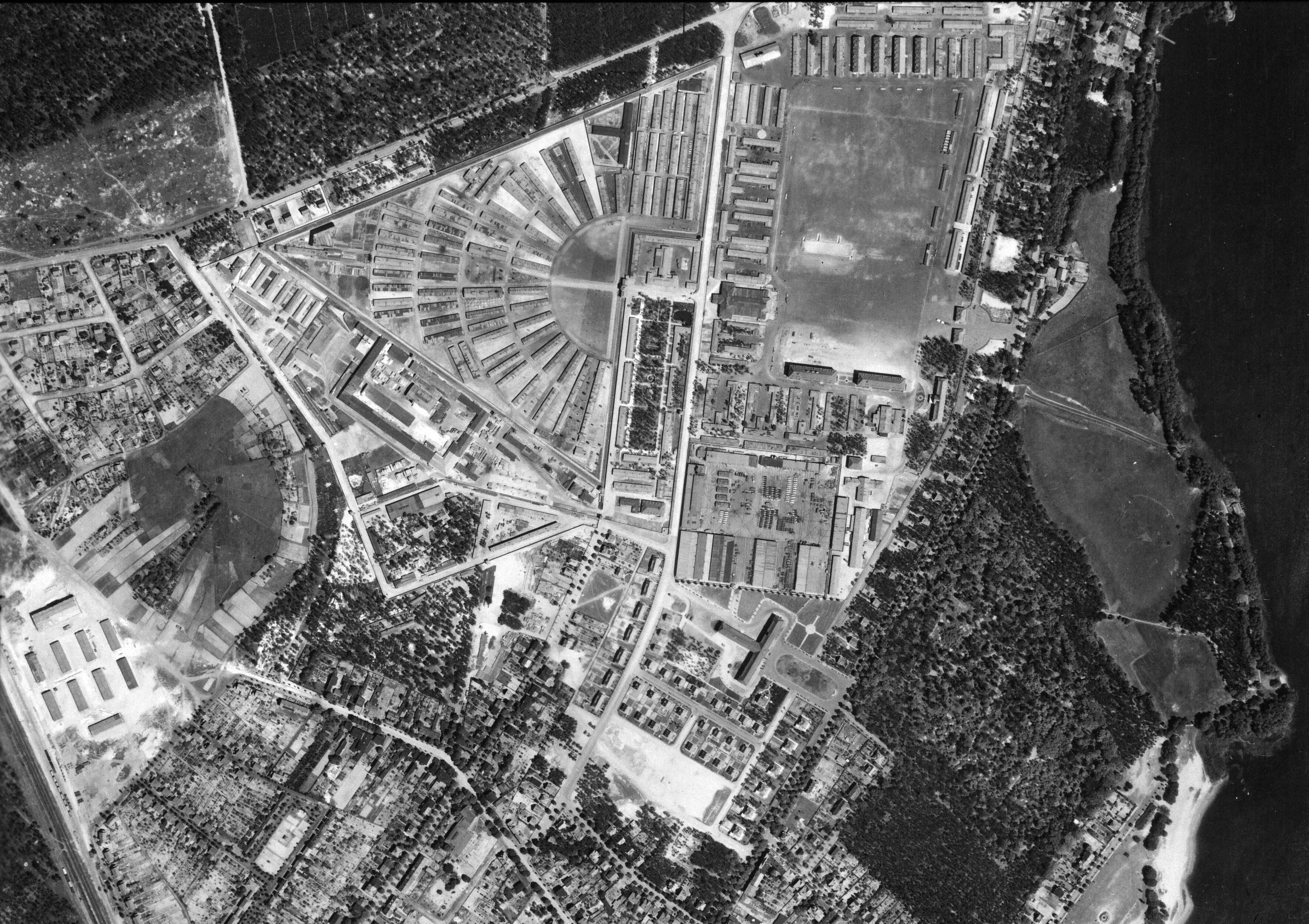
Photo of Sachsenhausen concentration camp, by the Royal Air Force, dated 1943. Exact date of photo is unknown.

In July 1936, the Esterwegen concentration camp and Columbia concentration camp were closed and those prisoners moved to the Oranienburg concentration camp. That summer, those prisoners began clearing an 80 hectares (200 acres) of triangular forested area. By 1937, the prisoners had erected prisoners' barracks and SS guards' quarters, and SS officers' families housing. The "protective custody" internment camp was laid out in an isosceles triangle with sides 600 m (2,000 ft) long. Tower A was at its central control point, linked to the SS troop camp outside along the central axis. The entire camp could be viewed by the SS command staff from Tower A. Initially 18 hectares (44 acres) in area, the camp eventually grew to cover 400 hectares (990 acres). Designed by Bernhard Kuiper, Himmler called Sachsenhausen a "completely new concentration camp for the modern age, which can be extended at any time." In practice, however, extending the design proved impractical.

An infirmary was located in the southern corner of the perimeter, while a camp prison stood in the eastern corner. The camp also included a kitchen and a laundry facility. As the camp's capacity proved insufficient, it was expanded in 1938 with the addition of a new rectangular section—the “small camp”—to the northeast of the entrance gate, and the perimeter wall was extended to enclose it. A further area, known as the Sonderlager, was established outside the main camp perimeter to the north. It consisted of two huts, Sonderlager “A” and “B,” constructed in 1941 to house special prisoners whom the regime sought to isolate.

=== Neutral zone ===
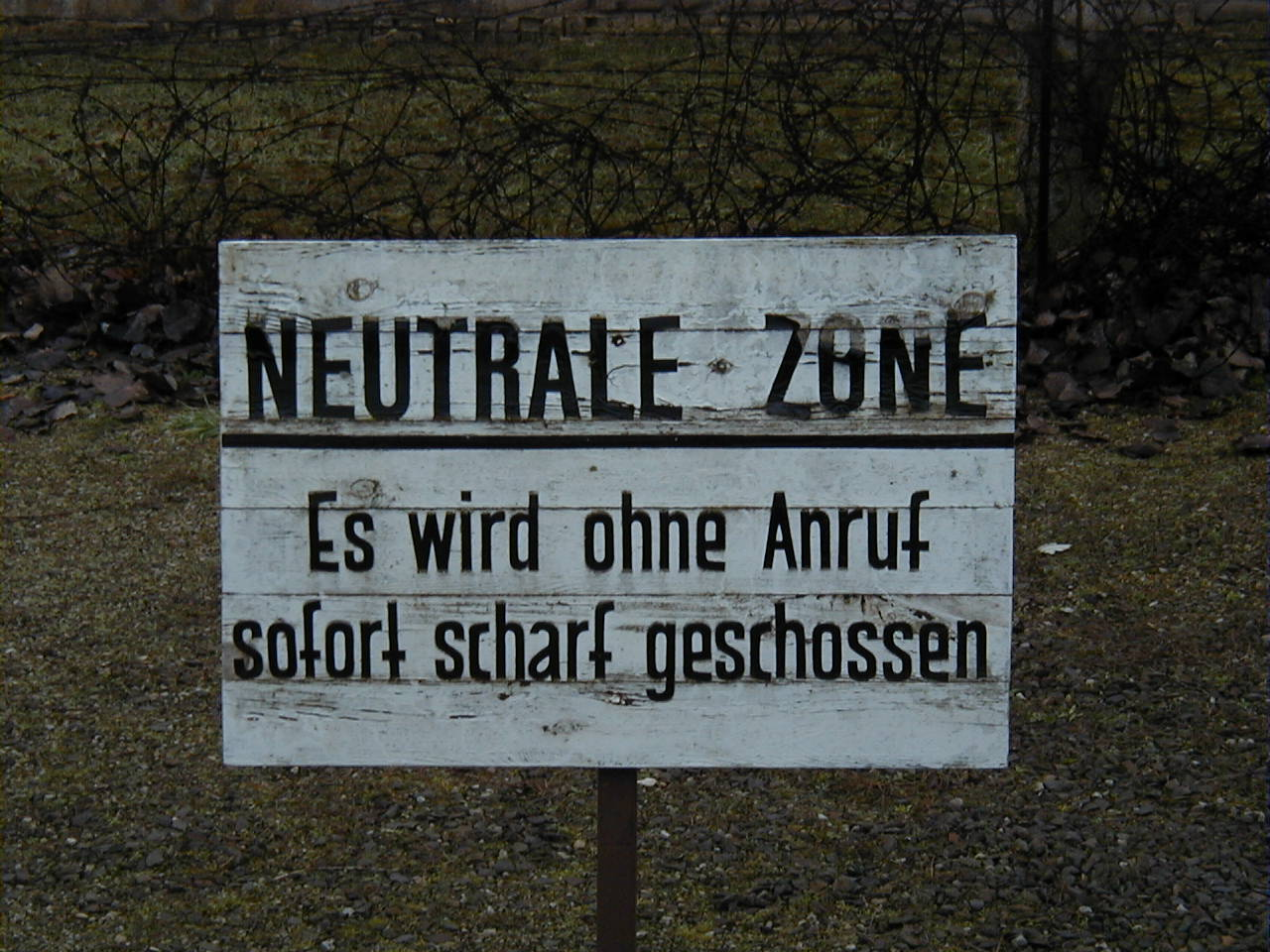
If a prisoner stepped inside or beyond the neutral zone they were immediately executed.

The neutral zone was located between the camp wall and the prisoners' camp. Between the zone and the wall was a trip wire, cheval de frise, barbed-wire obstacles, an electrified barbed-wire fence, and a sentry path.

== Slave labour ==
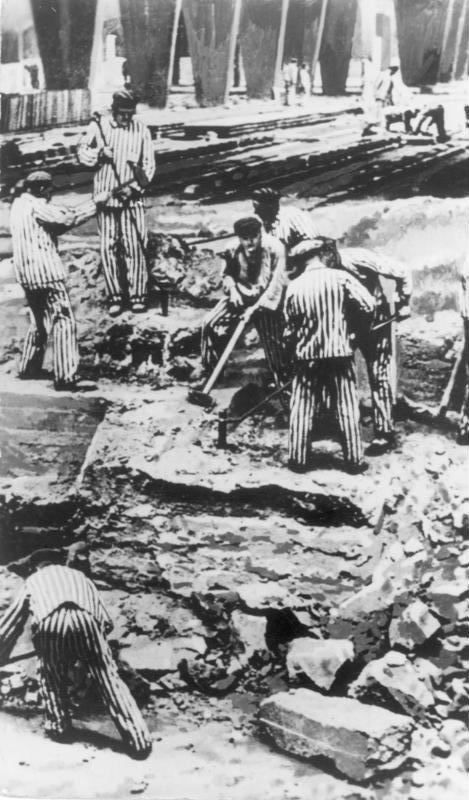
Brickworks prisoners, 1940

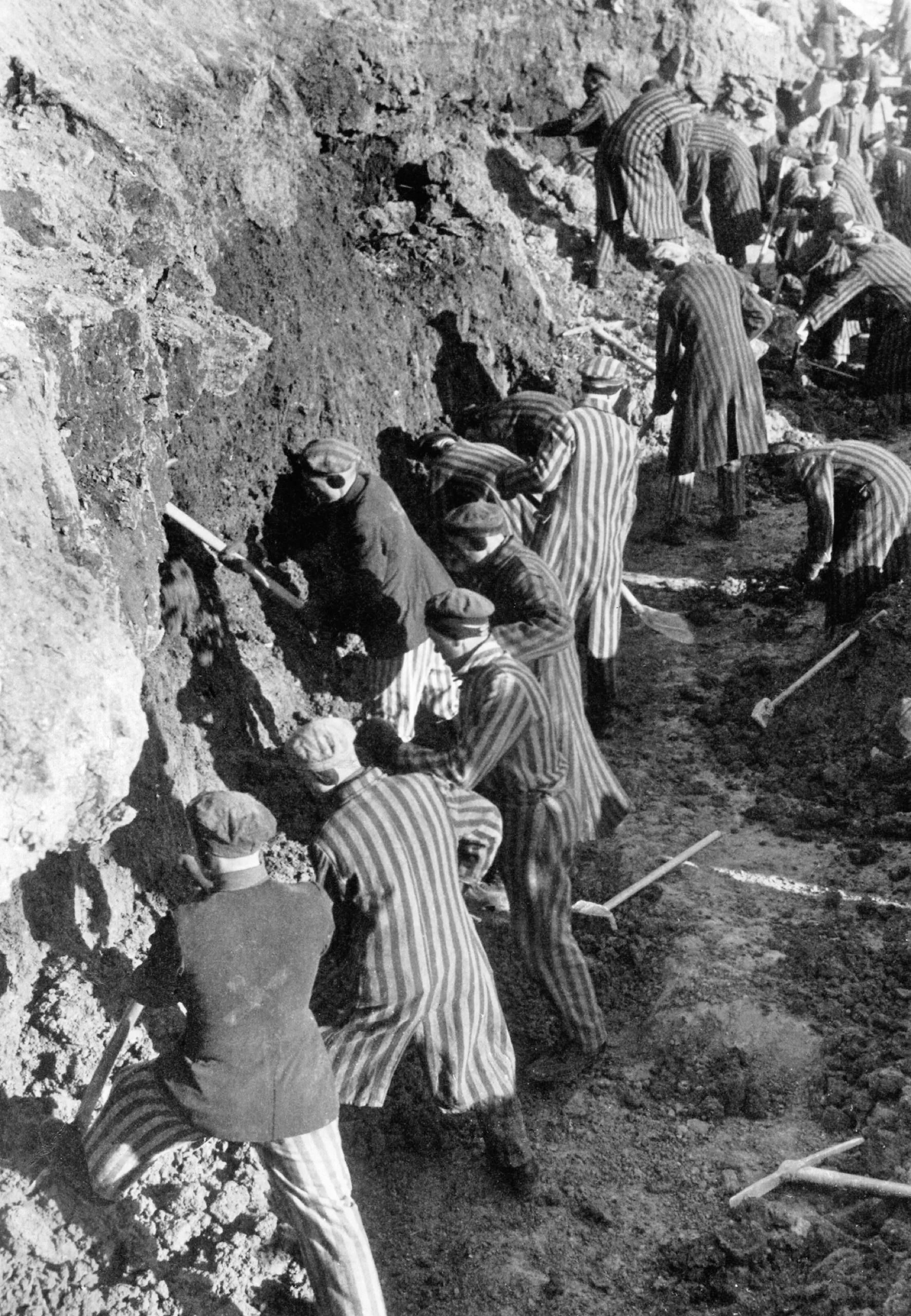
Propaganda photo at the clay pit, February 1941

Sachsenhausen was the site of Operation Bernhard, one of the largest currency counterfeiting operations ever recorded. The Germans forced inmate artisans to produce forged American and British currency, as part of a plan to undermine the British and American economies, courtesy of Sicherheitsdienst (SD) chief Reinhard Heydrich. The Germans introduced fake British £5, £10, £20 and £50 notes into circulation in 1943: the Bank of England never found them. Plans had been made to drop British pounds over London by plane. Today, these notes are considered very valuable by collectors.

An industrial area, outside the western camp perimeter, contained SS workshops in which prisoners were forced to work; those unable to work had to stand at attention for the duration of the working day. Heinkel, the aircraft manufacturer, was a major user of Sachsenhausen labour, using between 6,000 and 8,000 prisoners on their He 177 bomber. Although official German reports claimed the prisoners were "working without fault", some of these aircraft crashed unexpectedly around Stalingrad and it is suspected that prisoners had sabotaged them. Other firms included AEG and Siemens. Prisoners also worked in a brick factory.

== Prisoner abuses ==
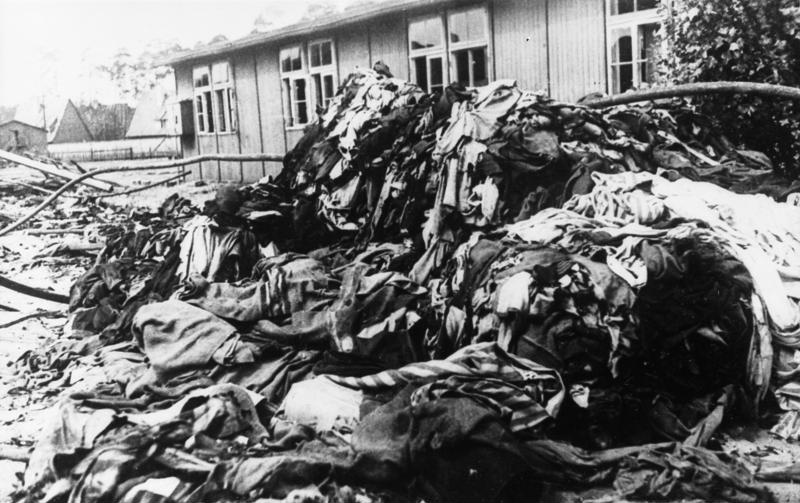
Clothing taken from prisoners

Overall, at least 30,000 inmates died in Sachsenhausen from causes such as exhaustion, disease, malnutrition and pneumonia, as a result of the poor living conditions. Many were executed or died as the result of brutal medical experimentation.

In 1937, the SS constructed a Cell Block for the punishment, interrogation, and torture of prisoners. Important people confined there included Martin Niemöller and Georg Elser.

From 1939 until 1943, over 600 homosexual prisoners were killed.

In November 1940, the SS executed 33 Polish prisoners by firing squad. In April 1941, over 550 prisoners were killed under Action 14f13. In the autumn of 1941, over 10,000 Soviet prisoners of war were shot.

In May 1942, the first hangings commenced from gallows in the roll-call area. These continued until 1945.

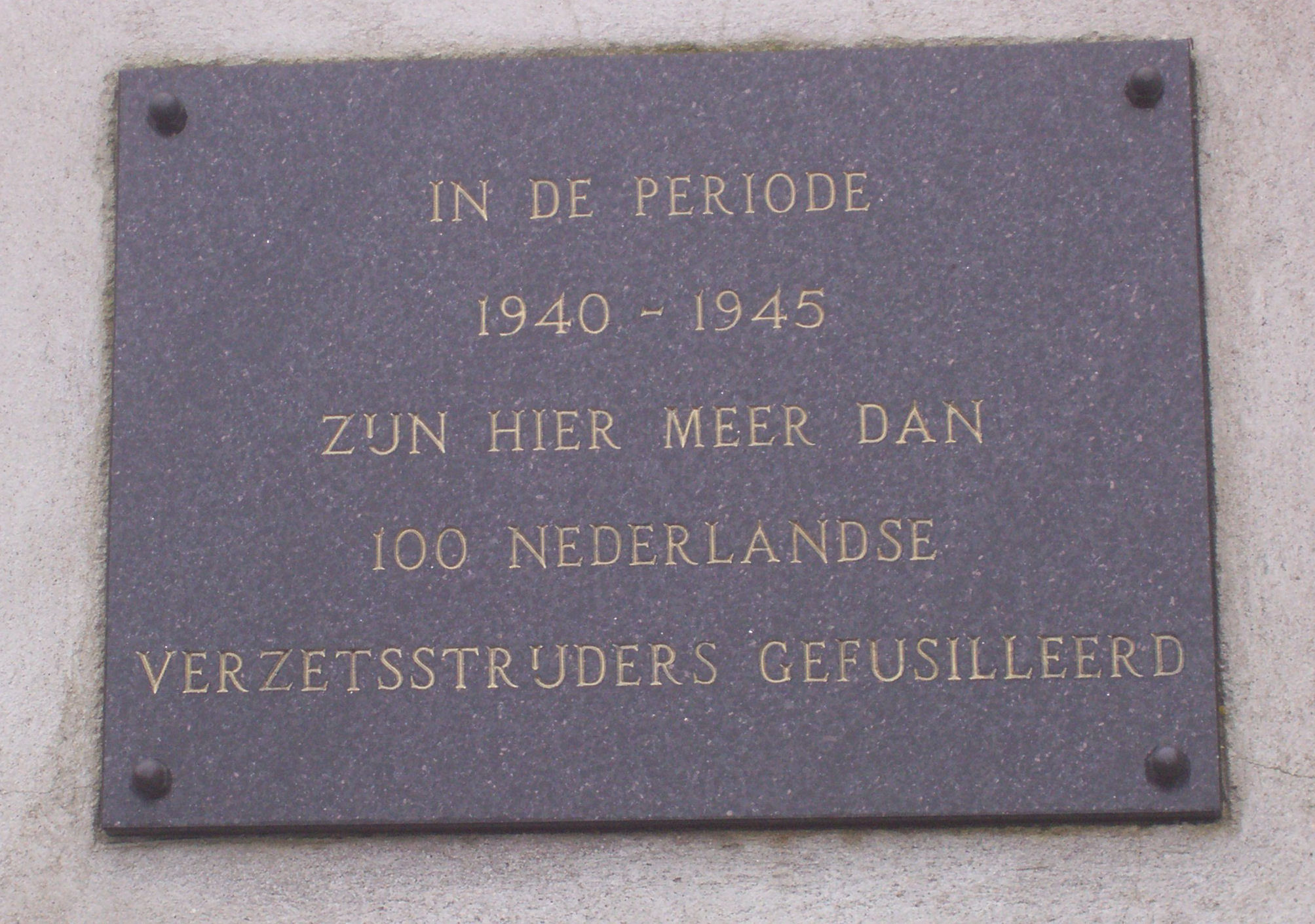
Plaque to honour Dutch resistance fighters executed at Sachsenhausen

In May 1942, 71 Dutch resistance fighters and 250 Jewish hostages were executed.

In May 1942, "Station Z" was completed in an industrial yard outside the camp walls. It included prisoner killing rooms, four crematoria, and a gas chamber after 1943. In 1941, an adjacent sand pit was enlarged and made into an "execution trench".

Camp punishments could be harsh. Some would be required to assume the "Sachsenhausen salute" where a prisoner would squat with his arms outstretched in front. There was a marching strip around the perimeter of the roll call ground, where prisoners had to march over a variety of surfaces, to test military footwear; between 25 and 40 kilometres (16 and 25 mi) were covered each day. Prisoners assigned to the camp prison would be kept in isolation on poor rations and some would be suspended from posts by their wrists tied behind their backs (strappado). In cases such as attempted escape, there would be a public hanging in front of the assembled prisoners. Prisoners of war were made to run up to 40 km (25 mi) a day with heavy packs, sometimes after being given performance-boosting drugs like cocaine, to trial military boots in tests commissioned by shoe factories.

Wolfgang Wirth did experiments using the lethal sulfur mustard gas.

There have also been allegations of an experimental drug tested upon unwilling inmates in 1944 designated "D-IX" at the Sachsenhausen facility. Designed to increase stamina and endurance, this drug, supposedly consisting of a cocktail of cocaine, methamphetamine (Pervitin), and oxycodone (Eukodal), was designed to see use from members of the Wehrmacht, Kriegsmarine and Luftwaffe to enhance mission performance where endurance and exhaustion become pertinent issues. While these drugs were used in their individual forms by all branches of the German military, the nature and use there of D-IX specifically (especially experimentation upon Sachsenhausen prisoners) lacks enough substantiation to be considered credible, though experiments by the Nazis upon unwilling prisoners utilizing psychoactive compounds is far from myth, and could hardly be ruled outside the realm of plausibility.

== Prisoners held or executed at Sachsenhausen ==
Seven men of the British Army's No. 2 Commando, captured after the highly successful Operation Musketoon, were executed at Sachsenhausen. They were shot on 23 October 1942, five days after Adolf Hitler issued his Commando Order calling for the killing of all captured members of commando units.

Four SOE agents led by Lt Cdr Mike Cumberlege RNR, who took part in the 1943 Operation Locksmith in Greece intended to blow up the Corinth Canal and were captured in May 1943, were held in Sachsenhausen's Zellenbau isolation cells for more than a year before being executed in February/March 1945.

Survivors of Operation Checkmate, a 1942 commando anti-shipping operation in Norway, including their leader, John Godwin, RN, were held at Sachsenhausen until February 1945, when they were executed. Godwin managed to wrestle the pistol of the firing party commander from his belt and shot him dead before being himself shot.

The Zellenbau of about 80 cells held some of World War II's most persistent Allied escapees as well as German dissidents, Nazi deserters and nationalists from East Europe such as the Ukrainian leader Taras Bulba-Borovets whom the Nazis hoped to persuade to change sides and fight the Soviets.

Over the course of its operation, over 100 Dutch resistance fighters were executed at Sachsenhausen. Dutch Freemasons were also sent to the camp including the Grand Master of the Grand Orient of the Netherlands, Hermannus van Tongeren sr., who died there in March 1941, after being arrested by Klaus Barbie.

== Aftermath ==
At the end of 1944, Himmler ordered the execution of every prisoner too ill to work. On 2 February 1945 an order issued by the camp commandant Anton Kaindl (1902–1948) instructed how the entire camp was to be 'evacuated.' Since the approach of the Red Army was gathering apace it was considered inappropriate to allow any of the imprisoned victims to fall into enemy hands. Kaindl writes of extreme measures to be taken and of an initial 'evacuation' of 2,500 prisoners able to march.

Around this time there were 58,000 male and 13,000 female prisoners present within the camp-complex and its system, of which 22,000 were registered within the main camp (Stammlager). The others were engaged in prioritised slave labour for the war economy. They worked in outer-lying workcamps (Außenlager) such as the one at Lieberose forced labor camp in Brandenburg.

Those within the camp system registered as being of Jewish origin numbered around 11,000. They had been hastily sent by rail from Auschwitz to Sachsenhausen or to one of its satellite workcamps. The liberation of Auschwitz by the Red Army on 27 January 1945 had led to alarm bells signalling how there was among the SS-hierarchy an urgent need to 'evacuate' the camps in the East. Only those deemed unfit were left behind to their fate. In the meantime the SS compelled the majority to be 'evacuated' through brutal route marches.

Such was the scene as one of Sachsenhausen's notable prisoners, the Norwegian resistance activist Odd Nansen (1901–1973), recorded events in his diary. He was witness to the arrival in Sachsenhausen of 1600 predominantly Jewish prisoners that had been route-marched from Lieberose forced labor camp. He describes "the skeletal figures" and the cynicism of the SS. A number of 'selections' ensued with hundreds among the emaciated new-arrivals being executed in the industrial yard (Industriehof).

Of the 1300 prisoners that had been left behind in Lieberose due to their sickness and incapacity there was no trace. In 1971 a mass grave was discovered with entwined and layered skeletal remains. The discovery caused outrage and sensation. The atrocity is said to have been the largest undertaken outside of an 'official' concentration camp.

Yet the question remains why did the SS insist on a route march. Why didn't they murder all of the in-mates of Lieberose in a single action? Why force so many men to march to Sachsenhausen? The answer lies in the prevailing hypocrisy and discrepancy in Nazi policy at the time. Although the camp commandant Anton Kaindl had instructed the 'evacuation' of prisoners able to work this was a very impractical decision. In the last days of the Third Reich the German national and local economy was quickly disintegrating due to the widespread internal chaos and as a result of Allied bombing.

It was agreed, however, in the higher Nazi echelons to 'evacuate' those who could work and to leave behind the sick and incapacitated. The latter decision was openly interpreted and quite often, as was the case in Lieberose, the 'unfit' were murdered as a result of an impulse undertaken by the local SS. It remains open to interpretation whether the extent of murder was orchestrated by local initiatives or was arranged by central authority. Such was the decaying process of the Third Reich in its last days.

In early April, 1945 Heinrich Himmler changed his tune. He had been in consultation with the International Red Cross and agreed through its representative in Berlin, Dr. Otto-Maurice Lehner, to ensure the handing out of food provisions for concentration camp prisoners. It was Himmler's intention to trade prisoners and to enable a smooth handing over of the concentration camps to the Western Allies as a means to negotiating a separate peace.

As an earlier indication of his 'good' will in mid-late February, 1945, Himmler had instructed the transportation by rail of 13, 000 sick prisoners from Sachsenhausen to Bergen-Belsen. The latter was considered within the SS hierarchy as a favourable 'exchange-camp,' but upon its liberation by the British Army on 15 April 1945, the scenes of inhumane overcrowding and mass-horror were for the whole world to see. Himmler then realised his efforts at 'exchange' and 'negotiation' had been illusory.

With his proposals rejected Himmler returned to the idea of complete 'evacuation' and to the murder of all sick and incapacitated prisoners. This caused concern amidst the Berlin delegates of the International Red Cross. They were informed of the scheduled 'evacuation' of Sachsenhausen by Rudolf Höß in a telephone conversation on 21 April 1945. In a telephone call the day before Dr. Otto-Maurice Lehner, the main Red Cross delegate, tried frantically to prevent the 'evacuation' of the camp. He spoke urgently with Gestapo-Chief Heinrich Müller. But nothing could be agreed upon to prevent the intended measures.

The 'evacuation' was scheduled for 21 April 1945. But due to discrepancies within the interpretation of the scheduled order one of the outlying workcamps in Schwarzheide was prematurely cleared of its inmates. The local SS separated Jewish from non-Jewish prisoners and marched the latter in the direction of Langenau while the Jews were loaded into open coal waggons and directed to Theresienstadt.

Regarding the 33,000 inmates of the main camp within the Sachsenhausen camp-complex (the 'Stammlager'), these were ordered presumably under the commandant's direction on a forced march northwest. To what extent the camp commandant Anton Kaindl could disclaim authority and so see his position as vacant remains, as with his post-war trial, open to interpretation.

As the Third Reich collapsed internally as well as from external pressure it remains hotly debated among historians where the impulse and direction of the death marches came from.

After several days marching the majority of the bedraggled column from Sachsenhausen (around 16,000 survivors) were herded into the woods of Belower Wald near Wittstock. The prisoners had to dig their own foxholes as protection against the cold nights. Some of them managed to live off roots and natural herbs. On 29 April the SS commanded the continuation of the enforced march. Most of the prisoners were physically exhausted and thousands did not survive; those who collapsed en route were shot by the SS.

As the main column disintegrated different groups of prisoners continued to march on in different directions. A large body of them were liberated near Raben Steinfeld and others in Schwerin, Ludwigslust and Parchim in early May, 1945 by units of the Red Army and by the 7 US-Tank Division. On 22 April 1945 Sachsenhausen's remaining 3,400 inmates were liberated by the Soviet 1st Belorussian Front and the Polish 2nd Infantry Division.

According to an article published on 13 December 2001 in The New York Times: "In the early years of the war the SS practiced methods of mass killing there that were later used in the Nazi death camps. Of the roughly 30,000 wartime victims at Sachsenhausen, most were Soviet prisoners of war." Many other thousands died among those forced into route-marches from Sachsenhausen's outer work camps (Außenlager) like Lieberose forced labor camp. The number of dead is hard to gauge.

In the depth of winter, in January 1945, around 1,290 Jewish women, desperate for food and lacking water, were marched on foot from Stutthof concentration camp to Sachsenhausen after having been shipped from as far afield as Vaivara concentration camp in Estonia. Some of the women had also previously been in Kaunas or in the Riga Ghetto and some had survived Kaiserwald concentration camp. From Stutthof they were compelled to join the death-march to Sachsenhausen.

At his war crimes trial in 1947 the last camp commandant, Anton Kaindl, acknowledged 42, 000 deaths during his time in charge between September 1942 and April 1945. During the 'Sachsenhausen Criminal Proceedings' in Berlin he was sentenced to life-long imprisonment. He died, however, while in Soviet captivity in Workuta in 1948. Since he and his staff disposed of all precise records the exact figure will never be known over how many people actually died before Soviet forces liberated Sachsenhausen in April 1945.

In a further trial the camp's official doctor, Dr. Alois Garberle (*1907-), was brought before a federal West-German court in Munster in 1962. It couldn't be established how many died during his tenure as camp-specialist. Needless to say, his neglect and following of orders contributed to the outbreak of sickness and disease. He was sentenced to 3 years imprisonment and was released in 1965.

== NKVD special camp Nr. 7 / Soviet Special Camp Nr. 1 (1945–1950) ==
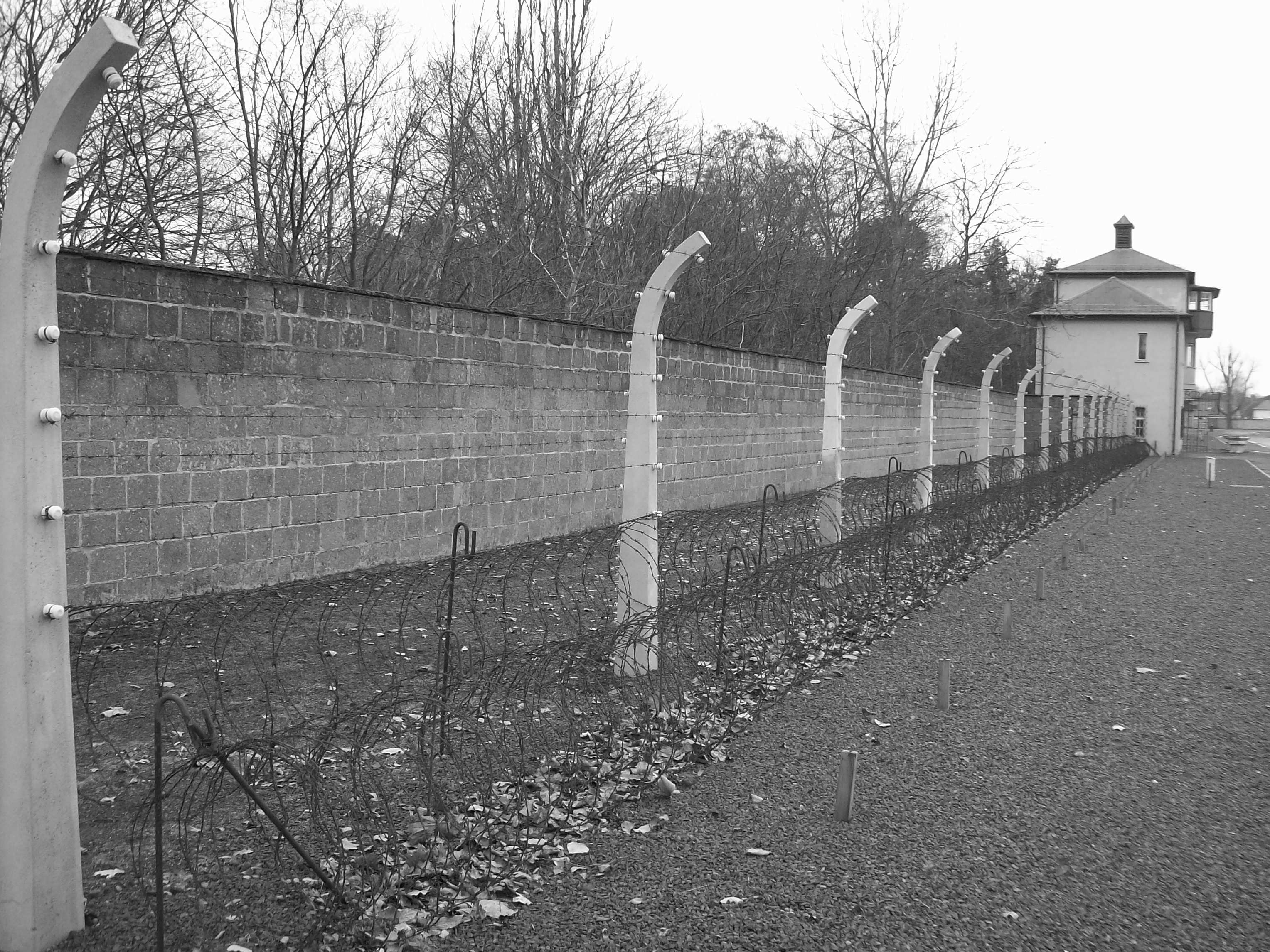
Recreation of the security perimeter at Sachsenhausen

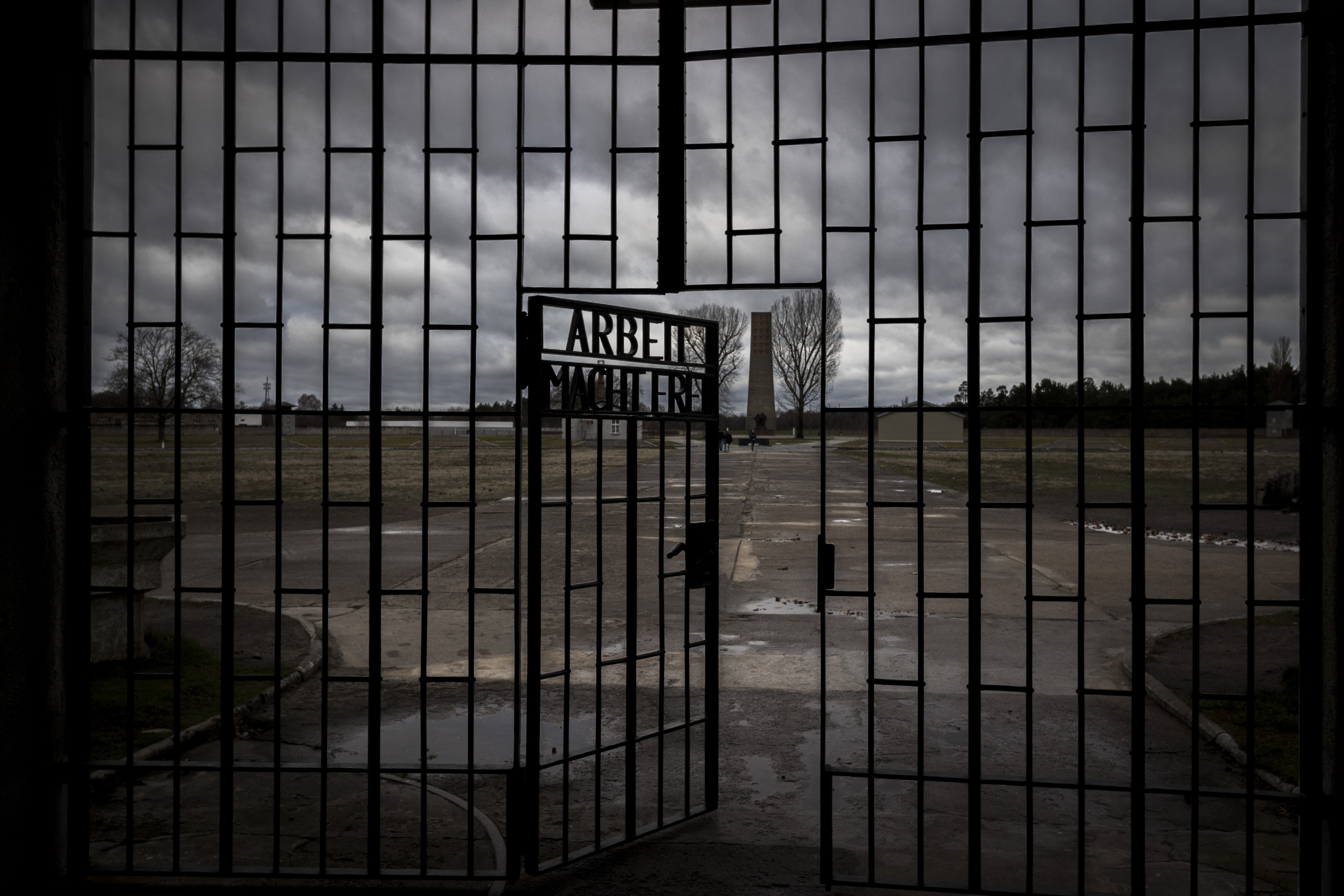
Sachsenhausen gate with the message "Arbeit macht frei"/ "Work makes you free"

After the last of the liberated concentration camp prisoners had left the site in the summer of 1945, the camp was used as a special camp by the Soviet military administration from August 1945 until 1950. Nazi functionaries were held in the camp, as were political prisoners and inmates sentenced by Soviet Military Tribunals.

In the beginning, 150 prisoners from NKVD special camp Nr. 7 Weesow near Werneuchen arrived in Sachsenhausen. Apart from the crematorium and the extermination facility, almost all buildings from the former concentration camp were used again (especially the wooden barracks, the camp prison and the utility buildings). Towards the end of 1945, the camp was again fully occupied (12,000 people). In the following year, up to 16,000 people were imprisoned in the camp at times. About 2,000 female prisoners lived in a separate area of the camp.

By 1948, Sachsenhausen, now renamed "Special Camp No. 1", was the largest of three special camps in the Soviet Occupation Zone. The 60,000 people interned over five years included 6,000 German officers transferred from Western Allied camps. Others were Nazi functionaries, anti-Communists and Russians, including Nazi collaborators. By the time the camp was closed in the spring of 1950, at least 12,000 had died of malnutrition and disease.

In spring 1950, a few months after the founding of the GDR, the last Soviet camps were dissolved. About 8,000 prisoners were released from Special Camp No. 1, and a smaller group was transported to the Soviet Union. The NKVD transferred 5,500 prisoners to the GDR authorities. Among them were 1,119 women and about 30 children born in the camp (so-called "Landeskinder") were transferred to the GDR women's prison at Hoheneck/Stollberg. The injustice of the continued use of the National Socialist concentration camps by the Soviet occupying power and the renewed agonising deaths of thousands of people associated with it were concealed or played down by the SED regime. During the Waldheim trials, some survivors of the Soviet camp in Sachsenhausen were sentenced to imprisonment in Bautzen or Waldheim.

== Camp staff ==
=== Commanders ===
- Michael Lippert, July 1936 – October 1936
- Karl-Otto Koch, October 1936 – July 1937
- Hans Helwig, July 1937 – January 1938
- Hermann Baranowski, February 1938 – September 1939
- Walter Eisfeld, 1939–1940
- Hans Loritz, 1940–1942
- Albert Sauer, 1942–1943
- Anton Kaindl, 1943–1945

=== Guards ===
Many women were among the inmates of Sachsenhausen and its subcamps. According to SS files, more than 2,000 women lived in Sachsenhausen, guarded by female SS staff (Aufseherin). Camp records show that there was one male SS soldier for every ten inmates and for every ten male SS there was a woman SS. Several subcamps for women were established in Berlin, including in Neukölln.

Sachsenhausen female guards included Ilse Koch, and later Hilde Schlusser. Anna Klein is also known to have worked at the camp.

== War crimes trials ==
Fourteen of the concentration camp's officials, including former commandant Anton Kaindl and the camp doctor Heinz Baumkötter, as well as two Kapos, were brought to trial on 23 October 1947 before a Soviet Military Tribunal in Berlin. On 1 November 1947, all sixteen of them were found guilty. Fourteen defendants were given life sentences with hard labor, including Kaindl and Baumkötter, and two others were sentenced to fifteen years in prison with hard labor. They served their time under harsh conditions in Siberian labor camps. Six of them, including Kaindl, died in custody within a few months. In 1956, those who were still alive were released and sent back to Germany.

A post war rumour alleged that the Dutch sought the extradition from Czechoslovakia of Antonín Zápotocký in 1945, who became President of Czechoslovakia, for his alleged role in the murder of Dutch prisoners during his time as a kapo at the camp. The Dutch government denied the rumour in 1946.

In the GDR, various subsequent trials took place against members of the SS guards of Sachsenhausen concentration camp, such as Roland Puhr and Arnold Zöllner. Puhr was executed in 1964, while Zöllner was sentenced to life imprisonment by the Rostock District Court in 1966.

In the Federal Republic of Germany, there were also various follow-up trials against guards members, such as the Sachsenhausen trials in Cologne in the 1960s. In 1960, a trial against SS-Hauptscharführer and Blockführer Richard Bugdalle for the murder of concentration camp inmates took place before the Munich II Regional Court. In March 2009 Josias Kumpf, 83 was deported from Wisconsin back to Austria after having been found to have been a SS Guard at KZ Sachsenhausen and Trawniki. In May 2022, a trial began in Germany against a SS guard at KZ Sachsenhausen of SS-Rottenführer Josef Schütz age 101. The next month, Schütz would be convicted and sentenced to five years in prison, becoming the oldest surviving Nazi fugitive to be convicted.

In August 2023, charges were brought against a former SS guard who served in Sachsenhausen Guard Battalion, Gregor Formanek. Despite the possibility that Formanek could've also be the potentially last former Sachenshausen Nazi officer to stand trial, it was acknowledged that his ability to stand trial was unlikely, due to limited capacity for understanding and will. In June 2024, a German court ruled that Formanek was unfit to stand trial, though an appeal would be likely. In spite of the German case against Formanek, it has also been acknowledged that Formanek had previously served 10 years of a 25-year prison sentence in a Soviet prison after being captured by Red Army forces in 1945. In December 2024, a Frankfurt court found that Formanek could face trial. However, Formanek died on 2 April 2025, shortly before a regional court in Hanau was set to make a ruling on whether he could stand trial; news of Formanek's death would not be made public until 30 April 2025.

== East Germany ==
=== East German barracks ===
After the Soviets vacated the site, it was used for some years by East Germany's Kasernierte Volkspolizei, notionally a police division and in reality a precursor of the country's own National People's Army, which was formally established in 1956.

=== Sachsenhausen National Memorial Site (Nationale Mahn- u. Gedenkstätte Sachsenhausen) ===
In 1956, planning began for the adaptation of the concentration camp site as a national memorial. This was inaugurated four years later on 23 April 1961 by Walter Ulbricht, First Secretary of the Socialist Unity Party (SED). The first director of the renamed "Sachsenhausen National Memorial Site" (Nationale Mahn- u. Gedenkstätte Sachsenhausen) was Christian Mahler, at one time a Volkspolizei officer, who back in the Nazi period had been an inmate at Sachsenhausen between 1938 and 1943. The plans involved the removal of most of the original buildings and the construction of an obelisk, statue and meeting area, reflecting the outlook of the government of East Germany of that time.

Other than the memorial sites in Buchenwald and Ravensbrück, the Sachsenhausen memorial, where the official celebrations of the German Democratic Republic (GDR) were held, was located in the former concentration camp. It was controlled by the Ministry of Culture, and as the National Memorial Sites Buchenwald and Ravensbrück, Sachsenhausen served as place of identification and legitimisation of the GDR.

The government of East Germany emphasised the suffering of political prisoners over that of the other groups detained at Sachsenhausen. The memorial obelisk contains eighteen red triangles, the symbol the Nazis gave to political prisoners, usually communists. There is a plaque in Sachsenhausen built in memory of the Death March. This plaque has a picture of malnourished male prisoners marching, all of whom are wearing the red triangle of a political prisoner.

Based on reporting in the newspaper Neues Deutschland, historian Anne-Kathleen Tillack-Graf shows how the Sachsenhausen National Memorial Site was politically instrumentalised in the GDR, especially during the celebrations for the liberation of the concentration camp.

== Unified Germany ==
=== Museum ===
After German reunification, the former camp was entrusted to a foundation that opened a museum on the site. So since 1993, the Sachsenhausen Memorial and Museum (Gedenkstätte und Museum Sachsenhausen) has been responsible for exhibitions and research on the camp's history on the grounds of the former Sachsenhausen concentration camp. The educational work of the institution focuses on the history of the Oranienburg concentration camp, various aspects of the history of the Sachsenhausen concentration camp, the Soviet special camp and the history of the memorial itself.

The museum features artwork created by inmates and a 30-centimetre-high (12 in) pile of gold teeth (extracted by the Nazis from the prisoners), scale models of the camp, pictures, documents and other artifacts illustrating life in the camp. The administrative buildings from which the entire German concentration camp network was run have been preserved and can also be seen.

The part of the area that served as the barracks of the Schutzstaffel (SS) is now used by the University of Applied Sciences of the Brandenburg Police as a training center.

As of 2015, the site of the Sachsenhausen camp, Strasse der Nationen 22 in Oranienburg, is open to the public as a museum and a memorial. Several buildings and structures survive or have been reconstructed, including guard towers, the camp entrance, crematory ovens and the camp barracks.

=== Excavations ===
With the fall of communist East Germany, it was possible to conduct excavations in the former camps. At Sachsenhausen, the bodies of 12,500 victims were found; most were children, adolescents and elderly people.

=== Soviet-era crimes ===
Following the discovery in 1990 of mass graves from the Soviet period, a separate museum was opened documenting the camp's Soviet-era history. Between 1945 and 1950, 12,000 people died of hunger and disease in the so-called Speziallager.

=== Neo-Nazi vandalism ===
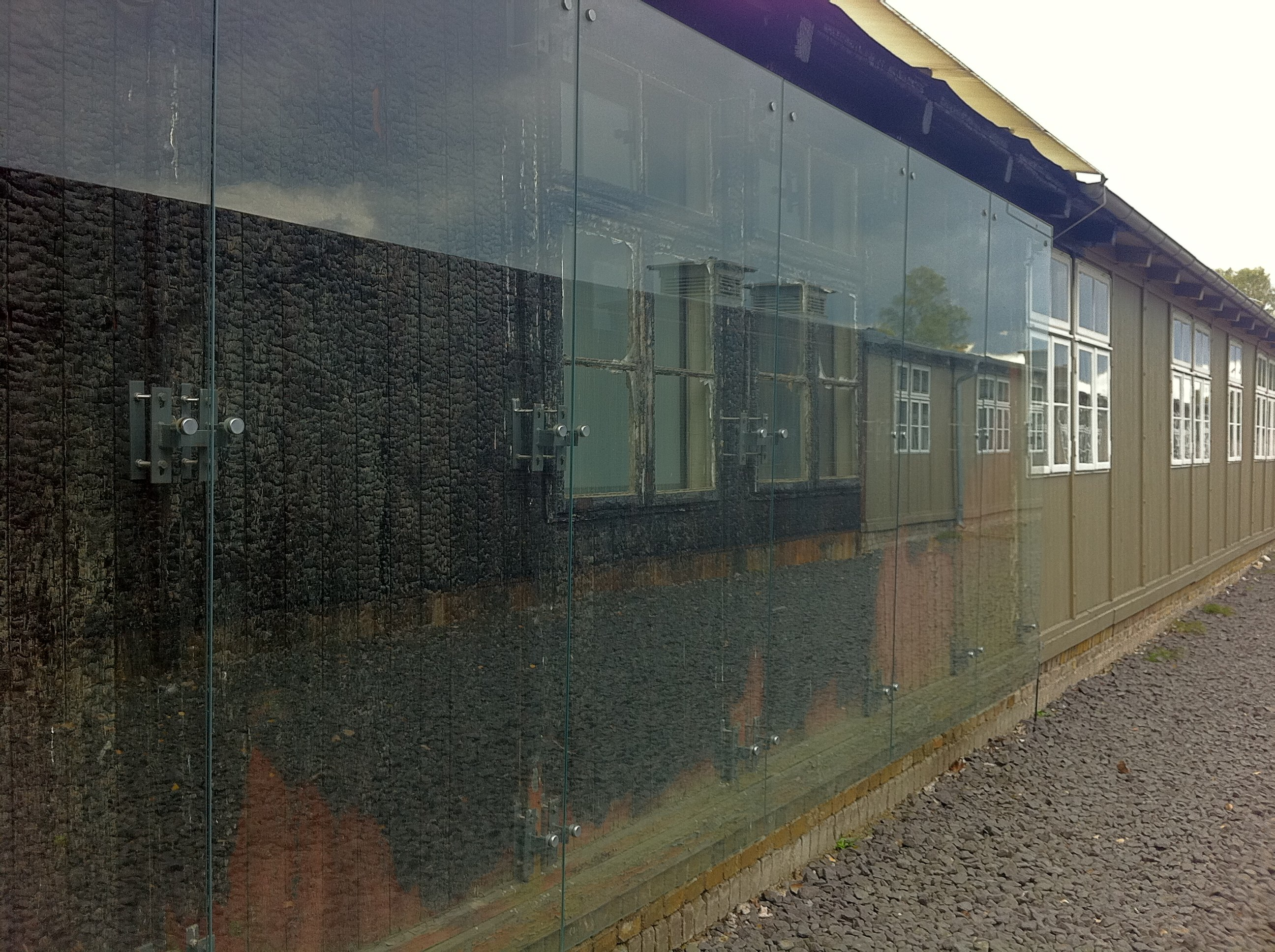
Arson damage caused to this barrack building has been covered by glass panels to protect it, whilst still showing the damage to those visiting the camp.

The compound has been vandalized by neo-Nazis several times. In September 1992, barracks 38 and 39 of the Jewish Museum were severely damaged in an arson attack. The perpetrators were arrested, and the barracks were reconstructed by 1997. The decision was made that no buildings built during the Nazi regime will be rebuilt on the site. The destroyed section of the huts are now a Jewish museum with the surviving section left as it was immediately after the fire with the paint still blistered from the flames.

=== Video game scandal ===
Sites within Sachsenhausen and Dachau which had been approved for inclusion in the augmented reality smartphone game Ingress were removed in July 2015. Gabriele Hammerman, director of the memorial site at Dachau, told the Deutsche Presse-Agentur that Google's actions were a humiliation for the victims of the Nazi camps and their relatives, and Niantic Labs' founder John Hanke stated that "we apologize that this has happened."

== See also ==
- List of subcamps of Sachsenhausen
- List of Nazi concentration camps
- International concentration camp committees
- Franciszek Gajowniczek
