= List of Axis personnel indicted for war crimes =

The following is a list of people who were formally indicted for committing war crimes or crimes against humanity on behalf of the Axis powers during World War II, including those who were acquitted or never received judgement. It does not include people who may have committed war crimes but were never formally indicted, or who were indicted only for other types of crimes.

== Nuremberg trials ==
- Martin Bormann – Guilty, sentenced in absentia to death by hanging. Later proven he committed suicide to avoid capture at the end of World War II in Europe, and remains discovered in 1972 were conclusively proven to be Bormann by forensic tests on the skull in 1998. Nonetheless, Simon Wiesenthal, Hugh Thomas and Reinhard Gehlen refused to accept this. Gehlen further argued Bormann was the secret Russian double agent 'Sasha'.
- Karl Dönitz – Guilty, sentenced to 10 years' imprisonment.
- Hans Frank – Guilty, sentenced to death by hanging
- Wilhelm Frick – Guilty, sentenced to death by hanging
- Hans Fritzsche – Acquitted. Tried, convicted and sentenced to nine years' imprisonment by a separate West German denazification court. Released September 1950.
- Walther Funk – Guilty, sentenced to life imprisonment, released in 1957 due to poor health.
- Hermann Göring – Guilty, sentenced to death by hanging but committed suicide by ingesting cyanide two hours before the sentence was to be carried out.
- Rudolf Hess – Guilty, sentenced to life imprisonment, committed suicide in prison in 1987.
- Alfred Jodl – Guilty, sentenced to death by hanging. Henri Donnedieu de Vabres called the verdict a mistake in 1947. In 1953, the denazification courts reversed the decision and found Jodl not guilty. Within months, the decision of the denazification court was itself overturned. His property, confiscated in 1946, was returned to his widow.
- Ernst Kaltenbrunner – Guilty, sentenced to death by hanging.
- Wilhelm Keitel – Guilty, sentenced to death by hanging.
- Gustav Krupp von Bohlen und Halbach – Medically unfit for trial. died 1950
- Robert Ley – Committed suicide before his trial began.
- Konstantin von Neurath – Guilty, sentenced to 15 years' imprisonment (released 1954 on grounds of ill health).
- Franz von Papen – Acquitted. Tried, convicted and sentenced to eight years' imprisonment by a separate West German denazification court. Released on appeal in 1949.
- Erich Raeder – Guilty, sentenced to life imprisonment (released 1955 on grounds of ill health).
- Joachim von Ribbentrop – Guilty, sentenced to death by hanging.
- Alfred Rosenberg – Guilty, sentenced to death by hanging.
- Fritz Sauckel – Guilty, sentenced to death by hanging.
- Hjalmar Schacht – Acquitted
- Baldur von Schirach – Guilty, sentenced to 20 years' imprisonment.
- Arthur Seyss-Inquart – Guilty, sentenced to death by hanging.
- Albert Speer – Guilty, sentenced to 20 years' imprisonment.
- Julius Streicher – Guilty, sentenced to death by hanging.

== Subsequent Nuremberg trials ==
=== Doctors' Trial ===
- Hermann Becker-Freyseng – Guilty, sentenced to 20 years' imprisonment, commuted to 10 years
- Wilhelm Beiglböck – Guilty, sentenced to 15 years' imprisonment, commuted to 10 years
- Kurt Blome – Acquitted
- Viktor Brack – Guilty, sentenced to death
- Karl Brandt – Guilty, sentenced to death
- Rudolf Brandt – Guilty, sentenced to death
- Fritz Fischer – Guilty, sentenced to life imprisonment, commuted to 15 years
- Karl Gebhardt – Guilty, sentenced to death
- Karl Genzken – Guilty, sentenced to life imprisonment, commuted to 20 years
- Siegfried Handloser – Guilty, sentenced to life imprisonment, commuted to 20 years
- Waldemar Hoven – Guilty, sentenced to death
- Joachim Mrugowsky – Guilty, sentenced to death
- Herta Oberheuser – Guilty, sentenced to 20 years' imprisonment, commuted to 10 years
- Adolf Pokorny – Acquitted
- Helmut Poppendick – Guilty, sentenced to 10 years' imprisonment (commuted to time served in 1951)
- Hans-Wolfgang Romberg – Acquitted
- Gerhard Rose – Guilty, sentenced to life imprisonment, commuted to 20 years
- Paul Rostock – Acquitted
- Siegfried Ruff – Acquitted
- Konrad Schäfer – Acquitted
- Oskar Schröder – Guilty, sentenced to life imprisonment, commuted to 15 years
- Wolfram Sievers – Guilty, sentenced to death
- Georg August Weltz – Acquitted

=== Milch Trial ===
- Erhard Milch – Guilty, sentenced to life imprisonment, commuted to 15 years (released in 1954)

=== Judges' Trial ===
- Josef Altstötter – Guilty, sentenced to five years' imprisonment
- Wilhelm von Ammon – Guilty, sentenced to 10 years' imprisonment
- Paul Barnickel – Acquitted
- Hermann Cuhorst – Acquitted
- Karl Engert – Unfit to stand trial
- Günther Joel – Guilty, sentenced to 10 years' imprisonment
- Herbert Klemm – Guilty, sentenced to life imprisonment
- Ernst Lautz – Guilty, sentenced to 10 years' imprisonment
- Wolfgang Mettgenberg – Guilty, sentenced to 10 years' imprisonment
- Günther Nebelung – Acquitted
- Rudolf Oeschey – Guilty, sentenced to life imprisonment
- Hans Petersen – Acquitted
- Oswald Rothaug – Guilty, sentenced to life imprisonment
- Curt Rothenberger – Guilty, sentenced to seven years' imprisonment
- Franz Schlegelberger – Guilty, sentenced to life imprisonment
- Carl Westphal – Committed suicide after his indictment but before the beginning of his trial

=== Pohl trial ===
- Hans Heinrich Baier – Guilty, sentenced to 10 years' imprisonment (released in 1951)
- Hans Bobermin – Guilty, sentenced to 20 years' imprisonment, commuted to 15 years (released in 1951)
- Franz Eirenschmalz – Guilty, sentenced to death, commuted to nine years' imprisonment
- Heinz Karl Fanslau – Guilty, sentenced to 25 years' imprisonment, commuted to 15 years
- August Frank – Guilty, sentenced to life imprisonment, commuted to 15 years
- Hans Hohberg – Guilty, sentenced to 10 years' imprisonment (released in 1951)
- Max Kiefer – Guilty, sentenced to life imprisonment, commuted to 20 years (released in 1951)
- Horst Klein – Acquitted
- Georg Lörner – Guilty, sentenced to death, commuted to 15 years
- Hans Lörner – Guilty, sentenced to 10 years' imprisonment (released in 1951)
- Karl Mummenthey – Guilty, sentenced to life imprisonment, commuted to 20 years
- Oswald Pohl – Guilty, sentenced to death
- Hermann Pook – Guilty, sentenced to 10 years' imprisonment (released in 1951)
- Rudolf Scheide – Acquitted
- Karl Sommer – Guilty, sentenced to death, commuted to 20 years' imprisonment
- Erwin Tschentscher – Guilty, sentenced to 10 years' imprisonment (released in 1951)
- Josef Vogt – Acquitted
- Leo Volk – Guilty, sentenced to 10 years' imprisonment, commuted to 8 years

=== Flick trial ===
- Odilo Burkart – Acquitted
- Friedrich Flick – Guilty, sentenced to seven years' imprisonment, but then released by John J. McCloy after three years
- Konrad Kaletsch – Acquitted
- Otto Steinbrinck – Guilty, sentenced to five years' imprisonment, but died in prison in 1949
- Hermann Terberger – Acquitted
- Bernhard Weiss – Guilty, sentenced to two-and-one-half years' imprisonment

=== IG Farben Trial ===
- Otto Ambros – Guilty, sentenced to eight years' imprisonment
- Max Brüggemann – Ruled unfit to stand trial
- Ernst Bürgin – Guilty, sentenced to two years' imprisonment
- Heinrich Bütefisch – Guilty, sentenced to six years' imprisonment
- Walter Dürrfeld – Guilty, sentenced to eight years' imprisonment
- Fritz Gajewski – Acquitted
- Heinrich Gattineau – Acquitted
- Paul Häfliger – Guilty, sentenced to two years' imprisonment
- Erich von der Heyde – Acquitted
- Heinrich Hörlein – Acquitted
- Max Ilgner – Guilty, sentenced to three years' imprisonment
- Friedrich Jähne – Guilty, sentenced to one-and-one-half years' imprisonment
- August von Knieriem – Acquitted
- Carl Krauch – Guilty, sentenced to six years' imprisonment
- Hans Kugler – Guilty, sentenced to one-and-one-half years' imprisonment
- Hans Kühne – Acquitted
- Carl Lautenschläger – Acquitted
- Wilhelm Rudolf Mann – Acquitted
- Heinrich Oster – Guilty, sentenced to two years' imprisonment
- Hermann Schmitz – Guilty, sentenced to four years' imprisonment
- Christian Schneider – Acquitted
- Georg von Schnitzler – Guilty, sentenced to two-and-one-half years' imprisonment
- Fritz ter Meer – Guilty, sentenced to seven years' imprisonment
- Carl Wurster – Acquitted

=== Hostages Trial ===
- Franz Böhme – Committed suicide
- Ernst Dehner – Guilty, sentenced to 17 years' imprisonment (released in 1951)
- Hellmuth Felmy – Guilty, sentenced to 15 years' imprisonment, commuted to 10 years (released December 1951)
- Hermann Foertsch – Acquitted
- Kurt von Geitner – Acquitted
- Walter Kuntze – Guilty, sentenced to life imprisonment (released on medical grounds in 1953)
- Hubert Lanz – Guilty, sentenced to 12 years' imprisonment (released on in 1951)
- Wilhelm List – Guilty, sentenced to life imprisonment (released on medical grounds in 1952)
- Ernst von Leyser – Guilty, sentenced to 10 years' imprisonment (released on medical grounds in 1951)
- Lothar Rendulic – Guilty, sentenced to 20 years' imprisonment, commuted to 10 years
- Wilhelm Speidel – Guilty, sentenced to 20 years' imprisonment (released on in 1951)
- Maximilian von Weichs – Ruled unfit to stand trial

=== RuSHA trial ===
- Heinz Brückner – Guilty, sentenced to 15 years' imprisonment
- Rudolf Creutz – Guilty, sentenced to 15 years' imprisonment
- Gregor Ebner – Guilty, released after the judgment due to time already served
- Ulrich Greifelt – Guilty, sentenced to lifetime imprisonment
- Richard Hildebrandt – Guilty, sentenced to 25 years' imprisonment, then turned over to the Polish authorities and sentenced to death
- Otto Hofmann – Guilty, sentenced to 25 years' imprisonment
- Herbert Hübner – Guilty, sentenced to 15 years' imprisonment
- Werner Lorenz – Guilty, sentenced to 20 years' imprisonment
- Konrad Meyer-Hetling – Guilty, released after the judgment due to time already served
- Fritz Schwalm – Guilty, sentenced to 10 years' imprisonment
- Otto Schwarzenberger – Guilty, released after the judgment due to time already served
- Max Sollmann – Guilty, released after the judgment due to time already served
- Günther Tesch – Guilty, released after the judgment due to time already served
- Inge Viermetz – Acquitted

=== Einsatzgruppen trial ===
- Ernst Biberstein – Guilty, sentenced to death, commuted to life imprisonment
- Paul Blobel – Guilty, sentenced to death
- Walter Blume – Guilty, sentenced to death, commuted to 25 years' imprisonment
- Werner Braune – Guilty, sentenced to death
- Lothar Fendler – Guilty, sentenced to 10 years' imprisonment, commuted to eight years
- Walter Hänsch – Guilty, sentenced to death, commuted to 15 years' imprisonment
- Emil Haussmann – Committed suicide
- Heinz Jost – Guilty, sentenced to life imprisonment, commuted to 10 years
- Waldemar Klingelhöfer – Guilty, sentenced to death, commuted to life imprisonment
- Erich Naumann – Guilty, sentenced to death
- Gustav Adolf Nosske – Guilty, sentenced to life imprisonment, commuted to 10 years
- Otto Ohlendorf – Guilty, sentenced to death
- Adolf Ott – Guilty, sentenced to death, commuted to life imprisonment
- Waldemar von Radetzky – Guilty, sentenced to 20 years' imprisonment (released in 1951)
- Otto Rasch – Ruled unfit to stand trial
- Felix Rühl – Guilty, sentenced to 10 years' imprisonment (released in 1951)
- Martin Sandberger – Guilty, sentenced to death, commuted to life imprisonment
- Heinz Schubert – Guilty, sentenced to death, commuted to 10 years' imprisonment
- Erwin Schulz – Guilty, sentenced to 20 years' imprisonment, commuted to 15 years
- Willy Seibert – Guilty, sentenced to death, commuted to 15 years' imprisonment
- Franz Six – Guilty, sentenced to 20 years' imprisonment, commuted to 15 years
- Eugen Steimle – Guilty, sentenced to death, commuted to 20 years' imprisonment
- Edward Strauch – Guilty, sentenced to death, died in a hospital while suffering from an epileptic attack

=== Krupp trial ===
- Friedrich von Bülow – Guilty, sentenced to 12 years' imprisonment
- Karl Adolf Ferdinand Eberhardt – Guilty, sentenced to nine years' imprisonment
- Eduard Houdremont – Guilty, sentenced to 10 years' imprisonment
- Max Otto Ihn – Guilty, sentenced to nine years' imprisonment
- Friedrich Wilhelm Janssen – Guilty, sentenced to 10 years' imprisonment
- Heinrich Leo Korschan – Guilty, sentenced to six years' imprisonment
- Alfried Krupp – Guilty, sentenced to 12 years' imprisonment plus forfeiture of property. Was released by John J. McCloy 1951, and had his property returned to him
- Auden Vailes – Guilty, sentenced to 89 years' 6 months' imprisonment
- Werner Wilhelm Heinrich Lehmann – Guilty, sentenced to six years' imprisonment
- Ewald Oskar Ludwig Löser – Guilty, sentenced to seven years' imprisonment
- Erich Müller – Guilty, sentenced to 12 years' imprisonment
- Karl Heinrich Pfirsch – Acquitted

=== Ministries Trial ===
- Gottlob Berger – Guilty, sentenced to 25 years' imprisonment (released in 1951)
- Ernst Wilhelm Bohle – Guilty, sentenced to five years' imprisonment
- Richard Walther Darré – Guilty, sentenced to seven years' imprisonment (released in 1950)
- Otto Dietrich – Guilty, sentenced to seven years' imprisonment (released in 1950)
- Otto von Erdmannsdorff – Acquitted
- Hans Kehrl – Guilty, sentenced to 15 years' imprisonment (released in 1951)
- Wilhelm Keppler – Guilty, sentenced to 10 years' imprisonment (released in 1951)
- Paul Körner – Guilty, sentenced to 15 years' imprisonment (released in 1951)
- Lutz Graf Schwerin von Krosigk – Guilty, sentenced to 10 years' imprisonment (released in 1951)
- Hans Heinrich Lammers – Guilty, sentenced to 20 years' imprisonment (released in 1951)
- Otto Meissner – Acquitted
- Gustav Adolf Steengracht von Moyland – Guilty, sentenced to seven years' imprisonment (released in 1950)
- Paul Pleiger – Guilty, sentenced to 15 years' imprisonment (released in 1951)
- Emil Puhl – Guilty, sentenced to five years' imprisonment
- Karl Rasche – Guilty, sentenced to seven years' imprisonment
- Karl Ritter – Guilty, released after the judgment due to time already served
- Walter Schellenberg – Guilty, sentenced to six years' imprisonment
- Wilhelm Stuckart – Guilty, released after the judgment due to time already served
- Edmund Veesenmayer – Guilty, sentenced to 20 years' imprisonment (released in 1951)
- Ernst von Weizsäcker – Guilty, sentenced to seven years' imprisonment (released in 1950 by John J. McCloy)
- Ernst Woermann – Guilty, sentenced to seven years' imprisonment (released in 1951)

=== High Command Trial ===
- Johannes Blaskowitz – Committed suicide
- Karl-Adolf Hollidt – Guilty, sentenced to five years' imprisonment (released in 1949)
- Hermann Hoth – Guilty, sentenced to 15 years' imprisonment (released in 1954)
- Georg von Küchler – Guilty, sentenced to 20 years' imprisonment, commuted to 12 years (released in 1953 on medical grounds)
- Wilhelm Ritter von Leeb – Guilty, released after judgment due to time already served.
- Rudolf Lehmann – Guilty, sentenced to seven years' imprisonment
- Hermann Reinecke – Guilty, sentenced to life imprisonment (released in 1954)
- Georg-Hans Reinhardt – Guilty, sentenced to 15 years' imprisonment (released in 1952)
- Karl von Roques – Guilty, sentenced to 20 years' imprisonment, died in prison in 1949
- Hans von Salmuth – Guilty, sentenced to 20 years' imprisonment, commuted to 12 years
- Otto Schniewind – Acquitted
- Hugo Sperrle – Acquitted
- Walter Warlimont – Guilty, sentenced to life imprisonment (released in 1954)
- Otto Wöhler – Guilty, sentenced to eight years' imprisonment (released in 1951)

== Auschwitz trial ==
- Hans Aumeier – Guilty, sentenced to death
- August Bogusch – Guilty, sentenced to death
- Therese Brandl – Guilty, sentenced to death
- Arthur Breitwiser – Guilty, sentenced to death, commuted to life imprisonment
- Alexander Bülow – Guilty, sentenced to 15 years' imprisonment
- Fritz Buntrock – Guilty, sentenced to death
- Luise Danz – Guilty, sentenced to life imprisonment
- Erich Dinges – Guilty, sentenced to five years' imprisonment
- Wilhelm Gehring – Guilty, sentenced to death
- Paul Götze – Guilty, sentenced to death
- Maximilian Grabner – Guilty, sentenced to death
- Hans Hofmann – Guilty, sentenced to 15 years' imprisonment
- Rudolf Höss – Guilty, sentenced to death
- Karl Jeschke – Guilty, sentenced to three years' imprisonment
- Heinrich Josten – Guilty, sentenced to death
- Oswald Kaduk – Guilty, sentenced to 25 years' imprisonment
- Hermann Kirschner – Guilty, sentenced to death
- Josef Kollmer – Guilty, sentenced to death
- Johann Kremer – Guilty, sentenced to death, commuted to life imprisonment
- Hildegard Lächert – Guilty, sentenced to 15 years' imprisonment
- Arthur Liebehenschel – Guilty, sentenced to death
- Anton Lechner – Guilty, sentenced to life imprisonment
- Eduard Lorenz – Guilty, sentenced to 15 years' imprisonment
- Herbert Ludwig – Guilty, sentenced to death
- Maria Mandl – Guilty, sentenced to death
- Adolf Medefind – Guilty, sentenced to life imprisonment
- Karl Möckel – Guilty, sentenced to death
- Kurt Mueller – Guilty, sentenced to death
- Erich Muehsfeldt – Guilty, sentenced to death
- Hans Münch – Acquitted
- Detlef Nebbe – Guilty, sentenced to life imprisonment
- Alice Orlowski – Guilty, sentenced to 15 years' imprisonment
- Ludwig Plagge – Guilty, sentenced to death
- Franz Romeikat – Guilty, sentenced to 15 years' imprisonment
- Richard Schröder – Guilty, sentenced to 10 years' imprisonment
- Hans Schumacher – Guilty, sentenced to death
- Karl Seufert – Guilty, sentenced to life imprisonment
- Paul Szczurek – Guilty, sentenced to death
- Johannes Weber – Guilty, sentenced to 15 years' imprisonment

== Frankfurt Auschwitz trials ==
- Stefan Baretzki – Guilty, sentenced to life plus eight years' imprisonment
- Emil Bednarek – Guilty, sentenced to life imprisonment.
- Wilhelm Boger – Guilty, sentenced to life plus five years' imprisonment
- Perry Broad – Guilty, sentenced to four years' imprisonment
- Victor Capesius – Guilty, sentenced to nine years' imprisonment
- Klaus Dylewski – Guilty, sentenced to five years' imprisonment
- Willi Frank – Guilty, sentenced to seven years' imprisonment
- Emil Hantl – Guilty, sentenced to three-and-one-half years' imprisonment
- Karl-Friedrich Höcker – Guilty, sentenced to seven years' imprisonment
- Franz-Johann Hoffmann – Guilty, sentenced to life imprisonment
- Oswald Kaduk – Guilty, sentenced to life imprisonment
- Josef Klehr – Guilty, sentenced to life plus 15 years' imprisonment
- Franz Lucas – Guilty, sentenced to three years and three months’ imprisonment
- Robert Mulka – Guilty, sentenced to 14 years' imprisonment
- Willi Sawatzki – Acquitted
- Willi Schatz – Acquitted
- Herbert Scherpe – Guilty, sentenced to four-and-one-half years' imprisonment
- Bruno Schlange – Guilty, sentenced to six years' imprisonment
- Friedrich Schlüter – Guilty, sentenced to four-and-one-half years' imprisonment
- Johann Schobert – Acquitted
- Willi Stark – Guilty, sentenced to 10 years' imprisonment
- Kurt Uhlenbroock – Charges dropped due to lack of evidence.

== Dachau trials ==
=== Dachau ===
Malmedy massacre trial (please note that these are the original sentences; many were altered later)

- Bersin, Valentin
- Bode, Friedel
- Braun, Willi
- Briesemeister, Kurt
- Christ, Friedrich – sentenced to death
- Clotten, Roman
- Coblenz, Manfred
- Josef Diefenthal – sentenced to death
- Josef Dietrich – sentenced to life imprisonment
- Eckmann, Fritz
- Fischer, Arndt
- Georg Fleps – sentenced to death
- Friedrichs, Heinz
- Gebauer, Fritz
- Godicke, Heinz
- Goldschmidt, Ernst
- Gruhle, Hans
- Hammerer, Max
- Hecht, Armin
- Hendel, Willi – sentenced to death
- Hennecke, Hans
- Hillig, Hans
- Hoffmann, Heinz
- Hoffmann, Joachim – sentenced to death
- Huber, Hubert
- Jaekel, Siegfried
- Junker, Benoni
- Kies, Friedel – sentenced to death
- Gustav Knittel – sentenced to life imprisonment
- Kotzur, Georg
- Fritz Krämer – sentenced to 10 years' imprisonment
- Klingelhoefer, Oskar
- Kuehn, Werner
- Maute, Erich
- Mikolaschek, Arnold
- Motzheim, Anton
- Meunkemer, Erich
- Neve, Gustav
- Ochmann, Paul Hermann
- Joachim Peiper – sentenced to death
- Pletz, Hans
- Preuss, Georg
- Hermann Priess – sentenced to 20 years' imprisonment
- Rau, Fritz
- Rauh, Theo
- Rehagel, Heinz
- Reiser, Rolf
- Richter, Wolfgang
- Rieder, Max
- Ritzer, Rolf
- Rodenburg, Axel
- Rumpf, Erich
- Schaefer, Willi
- Von Schamier, Willi
- Schwambach, Rudolf
- Claus Schilling – Dachau camp doctor, sentenced to death for conducting experiments for malaria treatment on prisoners.
- Sickel, Kurt
- Siegmund, Oswald
- Sievers, Franz
- Siptrott, Hans
- Sprenger, Gustac
- Sternebeck, Werner
- Heinz Stickel – sentenced to death
- Stock, Herbert
- Erwin Szyperski – sentenced to life imprisonment
- Tomczak, Edmund
- Heinz Tomhardt – sentenced to death
- Tonk, August
- Trettin, Hans
- Wassenberger, Johann
- Weis, Guenther
- Werner, Erich
- Wichmann, Otto
- Zwigart, Paul

=== Buchenwald ===
- Max Schobert – Guilty, sentenced to death, commuted to five years imprisonment
- Josef Kestel – Guilty, sentenced to death
- Hermann Grossmann – Guilty, sentenced to death
- Hermann Helbig – Guilty, sentenced to death
- Hans Wolf – Guilty, sentenced to death
- Hubert Krautwurst – Guilty, sentenced to death
- Emil Pleissner – Guilty, sentenced to death
- Richard Köhler – Guilty, sentenced to death
- Friedrich Karl Wilhelm – Guilty, sentenced to death
- Hans Merbach – Guilty, sentenced to death
- Hans Theodor Schmidt – Guilty, sentenced to death
- Hermann Pister – Guilty, sentenced to death, died in prison
- Dr. Hans Eisele – Guilty, sentenced to death, commuted to life imprisonment
- Helmut Roscher – Guilty, sentenced to death, commuted to life imprisonment
- Phillip Grimm – Guilty, sentenced to death, commuted to life imprisonment
- Albert Schwartz – Guilty, sentenced to death, commuted to life imprisonment
- Hermann Hackmann – Guilty, sentenced to death, commuted to life imprisonment
- Gustav Heigel – Guilty, sentenced to death, commuted to life imprisonment
- Guido Reimer – Guilty, sentenced to death, commuted to life imprisonment
- Anton Bergmeier – Guilty, sentenced to death, commuted to life imprisonment
- Otto Barnewald – Guilty, sentenced to death, commuted to life imprisonment
- Peter Merker – Guilty, sentenced to death, commuted to 20 years
- Franz Zinecker – Guilty, sentenced to life imprisonment
- Josias Erbprinz zu Waldeck und Pyrmont Guilty, sentenced to life imprisonment, commuted to 20 years
- Dr. Werner Greunuss – Guilty, sentenced to life imprisonment, commuted to 20 years
- Dr. Edwin Katzenellenbogen – Guilty, sentenced to life imprisonment
- Ilse Koch – Guilty, sentenced to life imprisonment, but committed suicide in 1967
- Wolfgang Otto – Guilty, sentenced to 15 years' imprisonment
- Dr. Arthur Dietzsch – Guilty, sentenced to 15 years' imprisonment
- Walter Wendt – Guilty, sentenced to 15 years' imprisonment, commuted to five years
- Dr. August Bender – Guilty, sentenced to 10 years' imprisonment, commuted to three years

=== Mauthausen ===
- August Eigruber – death by hanging
- Viktor Zoller – death by hanging
- Friedrich Entress – death by hanging
- Hans Altfuldisch – death by hanging
- Josef Riegler – death by hanging
- Willy Brünning (Gusen) – death by hanging
- Emil Müller – death by hanging
- Kurt Keilwtz – death by hanging
- Franz Kautny – death by hanging
- Johannes Grimm (DEST-Wienergraben) – death by hanging
- Adolf Zutter – death by hanging
- Eduard Krebsbach – death by hanging
- Heinrich Häger – death by hanging
- Hans Spatzenneger – death by hanging
- Otto Striegel – death by hanging
- Werner Grahn – death by hanging
- Willy Jobst – death by hanging
- Georg Gössl – death by hanging
- Hans Diehl – death by hanging
- Paul Kaiser (Gusen) – death by hanging
- Waldemar Wolter – death by hanging
- Gustav Kreindl – death by hanging
- Willy Eckert – death by hanging
- Hermann Pribyll – death by hanging
- Josef Leeb – death by hanging
- Auden Vailes - death by hanging
- Wilhelm Henkel – death by hanging
- kapo Willy Frey – death by hanging
- Leopold Trauner (DEST-Gusen) – death by hanging
- Wilhelm Müller – death by hanging
- Heinrich Eisenhöfer – death by hanging
- Andreas Trumm – death by hanging
- Rudolf Mynzak – death by hanging
- Erich Meissner – death by hanging
- kapo Rudolf Fiegl (Gusen) – death by hanging
- Josef Niedermayer – death by hanging
- Julius Ludolf – death by hanging
- Hans Hegenscheidt – death by hanging
- Franz Huber – death by hanging
- Erich Wasicky – death by hanging
- Theophil Priebel – death by hanging
- Kaspar Klimowitsch (Gusen II) – death by hanging
- Heinrich Fitschok (Gusen II) – death by hanging
- Anton Kaufmann (DEST-Gusen) – death by hanging
- Stefan Barczey – death by hanging
- Karl Struller – death by hanging
- August Blei – death by hanging
- Otto Drabeck – death by hanging
- Vincenz Nohel – death by hanging
- Thomas Sigmund (Gusen) – death by hanging
- Heinrich Giese (Gusen) – death by hanging (changed to life imprisonment)
- Walter Höhler – death by hanging (changed to life imprisonment)
- Adolf Rutka (Gusen) – death by hanging (changed to life imprisonment)
- Ludwig Dörr (Gusen II) – death by hanging (changed to life imprisonment)
- Viktor Korger (Gusen II) – death by hanging (changed to life imprisonment)
- Karl Billman (Gusen II) – death by hanging (changed to life imprisonment)
- Herbert Grzybowski (Gusen) – death by hanging (changed to life imprisonment)
- Wilhelm Mack (Gusen) – death by hanging (changed to life imprisonment)
- Ferdinand Lappert (Gusen) – death by hanging (changed to life imprisonment)
- Michael Cserny – life imprisonment
- Paul Gützlaff (Gusen) – life imprisonment
- Josef Mayer – life imprisonment

=== Flossenbürg ===
- Konrad Blomberg – sentenced to death
- Christian Mohr – sentenced to death
- Ludwig Schwarz – sentenced to death
- Bruno Skierka – sentenced to death
- Albert Roller – sentenced to death
- Erhard Wolf – sentenced to death
- Josef Wurst – sentenced to death
- Cornelius Schwanner – sentenced to death
- Josef Hauser – sentenced to death
- Christian Eisbusch – sentenced to death
- Willi Olschewski – sentenced to death
- August Ginschel – sentenced to death
- Wilhelm Brusch – sentenced to death, commuted to life imprisonment
- Karl Keiling – sentenced to death, commuted to life imprisonment
- Alois Schubert – sentenced to death, commuted to life imprisonment
- Ludwig Buddensieg – life imprisonment
- Johann Geisberger – life imprisonment
- Michael Gelhard – life imprisonment
- Erich Mußfeldt – sentenced to death
- Hermann Pachen – life imprisonment
- Erich Penz – life imprisonment
- Josef Pinter – life imprisonment
- Alois Jakubith – life imprisonment
- Karl Mathoi – life imprisonment
- Georg Weilbach – life imprisonment
- Raymond Maurer – 30 years' imprisonment
- Gerhard Haubold – 20 years' imprisonment
- Eduard Losch – 20 years' imprisonment
- Walter Reupsch – 20 years' imprisonment
- Kurt Erich Schreiber – 20 years' imprisonment
- Hermann Sommerfeld – 15 years' imprisonment
- August Fahrnbauer – 15 years' imprisonment
- Peter Bongartz – 15 years' imprisonment
- Walter Paul Adolf Neye – 15 years' imprisonment
- Hans Johann Lipinski – 10 years' imprisonment
- Gustav Matzke – 10 years' imprisonment
- Karl Gräber – 10 years' imprisonment
- Franz Berger – 3½ years' imprisonment
- Joseph Becker – 1 year's imprisonment
- Karl Buttner – Acquitted
- Karl Friedrich Alois Gieselmann – Acquitted
- Georg Hoinisch – Acquitted
- Theodor Retzlaff – Acquitted
- Peter Herz – Acquitted

=== Mühldorf ===
- Franz Auer – sentenced to death
- Erika Flocken – sentenced to death
- Wilhelm Jergas – sentenced to death
- Herbert Spaeth – sentenced to death
- Otto Sperling – sentenced to death
- Heinrich Engelhardt – life imprisonment
- Hermann Giesler – life imprisonment
- Karl Gickeleiter – 20 years' imprisonment
- Wilhelm Griesinger – 20 years' imprisonment
- Jakob Schmidberger – 20 years' imprisonment
- Daniel Gottschling – 15 years' imprisonment
- Wilhelm Bayha – 10 years' imprisonment
- Karl Bachmann – Acquitted
- Anton Ostermann – Acquitted

=== Dora-Nordhausen ===
- Hans Möser – sentenced to death
- Erhard Brauny – life imprisonment
- Otto Brinkmann – life imprisonment
- Emil Bühring – life imprisonment
- Ruldof Jacobi – life imprisonment
- Josef Kilian – life imprisonment
- Georg König – life imprisonment
- Wilhelm Simon – life imprisonment
- Willi Zwiener – 25 years' imprisonment
- Arthur Andrä – 20 years' imprisonment
- Oskar Helbig – 20 years' imprisonment
- Richard Walenta – 20 years' imprisonment
- Heinrich Detmers – 7 years' imprisonment
- Walter Ulbricht – 5 years' imprisonment
- Paul Maischein – 5 years' imprisonment
- Josef Fuchsloch – Acquitted
- Kurt Heinrich – Acquitted
- Georg Rickhey – Acquitted
- Heinrich Schmidt – Acquitted

== Belsen trials ==
- Josef Kramer – Guilty, sentenced to death
- Irma Grese – Guilty, sentenced to death
- Elisabeth Volkenrath – Guilty, sentenced to death
- Johanna Bormann – Guilty, sentenced to death
- Fritz Klein – Guilty, sentenced to death
- For information about nine other Germans who were executed for their war crimes at Belsen, see Belsen Trial.

== Neuengamme Trials ==
- Max Pauly – Guilty, sentenced to death
- Bruno Kitt – Guilty, sentenced to death
- Anton Thumann – Guilty, sentenced to death
- Johann Reese – Guilty, sentenced to death
- Willy Warnke – Guilty, sentenced to death
- Alfred Trzebinski – Guilty, sentenced to death
- Heinrich Ruge – Guilty, sentenced to death
- Wilhelm Bahr – Guilty, sentenced to death
- Andreas Brems – Guilty, sentenced to death
- Wilhelm Dreimann – Guilty, sentenced to death
- Adolf Speck – Guilty, sentenced to death
- Karl Totzauer – Guilty, sentenced to 20 years' imprisonment
- Karl Wiedemann – Guilty, sentenced to 15 years' imprisonment
- Walter Kümmel – Guilty, sentenced to 10 years' imprisonment

== Bucharest People’s Tribunal ==
- Gheorghe Alexianu – Guilty, sentenced to death
- Ion Antonescu – Guilty, sentenced to death. Carried out June 1, 1946
- Mihai Antonescu – Guilty, sentenced to death. Carried out June 1, 1946
- Constantin Vasiliu – Guilty, sentenced to death

== International Military Tribunal for the Far East ==
(trials held in Tokyo)

- Sadao Araki – Guilty, sentenced to life imprisonment (released in 1955)
- Kenji Doihara – Guilty, sentenced to death
- Kingoro Hashimoto – Guilty, sentenced to life imprisonment (released in 1955)
- Shunroku Hata – Guilty, sentenced to life imprisonment (released in 1955)
- Kiichirō Hiranuma – Guilty, sentenced to life imprisonment (released in 1955)
- Kōki Hirota – Guilty, sentenced to death
- Naoki Hoshino – Guilty, sentenced to life imprisonment (released in 1955)
- Seishirō Itagaki – Guilty, sentenced to death
- Okinori Kaya – Guilty, sentenced to life imprisonment (released in 1955)
- Kōichi Kido – Guilty, sentenced to life imprisonment (released in 1955)
- Heitarō Kimura – Guilty, sentenced to death
- Kuniaki Koiso – Guilty, sentenced to life imprisonment (died in prison in 1950)
- Iwane Matsui – Guilty, sentenced to death
- Yōsuke Matsuoka – Died of natural causes during the course of the trial
- Jirō Minami – Guilty, sentenced to life imprisonment (released in 1955)
- Akira Mutō – Guilty, sentenced to death
- Osami Nagano – Died of natural causes during the course of the trial
- Takazumi Oka – Guilty, sentenced to life imprisonment (released in 1955)
- Shūmei Ōkawa – Ruled unfit to stand trial after suffering from mental illness
- Hiroshi Ōshima – Guilty, sentenced to life imprisonment (released in 1955)
- Kenryō Satō – Guilty, sentenced to life imprisonment (released in 1955)
- Mamoru Shigemitsu – Guilty, sentenced to seven years' imprisonment (released in 1950)
- Shigetarō Shimada – Guilty, sentenced to life imprisonment (released in 1955)
- Toshio Shiratori – Guilty, sentenced to life imprisonment (died in prison in 1949)
- Teiichi Suzuki – Guilty, sentenced to life imprisonment (released in 1955)
- Shigenori Tōgō – Guilty, sentenced to 20 years' imprisonment (died in prison in 1949)
- Hideki Tōjō – Guilty, sentenced to death
- Yoshijirō Umezu – Guilty, sentenced to life imprisonment (released in 1955)

Other trials were held at various locations in the Far East by the United States in the Philippines, Australia, China, the United Kingdom, and other Allied countries. In all, a total of 920 Japanese military personnel and civilians were executed following World War II.

== Khabarovsk War Crime Trials ==
- Mitomo Kazuo – Guilty, sentenced to 15 years' imprisonment
- Kawashima Kiyoshi – Guilty, sentenced to 25 years' imprisonment
- Onoue Masao – Guilty, sentenced to 12 years' imprisonment
- Kikuchi Norimitsu – Guilty, sentenced to two years' imprisonment
- Otozō Yamada – Guilty, sentenced to 25 years' imprisonment
- Kajitsuka Ryuji – Guilty, sentenced to 25 years' imprisonment
- Sato Shunji – Guilty, sentenced to 20 years' imprisonment
- Takahashi Takaatsu – Guilty, sentenced to 25 years' imprisonment
- Karasawa Tomio – Guilty, sentenced to 18 years' imprisonment
- Nishi Toshihide – Guilty, sentenced to 20 years' imprisonment
- Kurushima Yuji – Guilty, sentenced to three years' imprisonment
- Hirazakura Zensaku – Guilty, sentenced to 20 years' imprisonment

== By nationality ==
=== Austrian ===
- Hermine Braunsteiner – A female camp guard at both Ravensbrück and Majdanek, she was sentenced in Graz to three years imprisonment on April 7, 1948, for her crimes in Ravensbruck and released in April 1950. She was later extradited from the United States to West Germany in 1973 for her crimes in Majdanek. Sentenced to life imprisonment on June 30, 1981, she was released in 1996 due to poor health.
- Amon Göth – The commandant of the Kraków-Płaszów concentration camp, he was sentenced to death on September 5, 1946, and executed by hanging in Kraków on September 13, 1946.
- Konstantin Kammerhofer – The Higher SS and Police Leader in Croatia, he was convicted of war crimes in absentia by Yugoslavia but was never extradited by Germany.
- Richard Kaaserer – The SS and Police Leader in Sandžak and in Central Norway. Involved in Operation Kopaonik, he was sentenced to death on December 22, 1946, and executed by hanging in Belgrade on January 24, 1947.
- August Meyszner – The Higher SS and Police Leader in German-occupied Serbia, he was sentenced to death on December 22, 1946, and executed by hanging in Belgrade on January 24, 1947.
- Friedrich Rainer – The Gauleiter of Salzburg and Carinthia, he was also the Chief of Civil Administration of Upper Carniola in Slovenia. Sentenced to death by hanging in Ljubljana in July 1947, he was reportedly executed in November 1950.
- Hanns Albin Rauter – The Higher SS and Police Leader in the Netherlands, he was sentenced to death on May 4, 1948, at The Hague and executed by firing squad on March 25, 1949.
- Walter Reder – A Sturmbannführer in the Waffen-SS, he led the Marzabotto massacre. Sentenced to life imprisonment by an Italian military court in October 1951, he was paroled in January 1985.
- Siegfried Seidl – The commandant of the Theresienstadt concentration camp, he was sentenced to death in Vienna on November 14, 1946, and executed by hanging on February 4, 1947.

Franz Stangl, commandant at Treblinka and Sobibor

=== Croatian ===
- 1986 trial of Andrija Artuković
- 1945 Trial of Mile Budak: Mile Budak and others
- 1998–1999 trial of Dinko Šakić

=== Danish ===
- Søren Kam – (1921–2015) Member of the Nazi Party of Denmark, who fled from Denmark to Germany after the war, and later became a German citizen. On September 21, 2006, Kam was detained in the German town of Kempten im Allgäu. He was wanted in Denmark for the assassination of Danish newspaper editor Carl Henrik Clemmensen in Copenhagen in August 1943.

=== Dutch ===
- Pieter Menten, sentenced to 10 years in prison and fined 100,000 guilders for war crimes in 1980, released in 1986, died 1987.
- Willy Lages
- Ferdinand aus der Fünten
- Joseph Kotalla
- Franz Fischer

Important Dutch collaborators sentenced by the special tribunals in The Netherlands in connection with the Second World War. There have been 14,562 convictions pronounced by the special tribunals, and 49,920 sentences by courts. The special tribunals sentenced in more than 10,000 cases to prison sentences of 3 years or more, and in 152 cases condemned the guilty persons to death, many of which were commuted to life sentences or less. The other courts decided in 30,784 cases on internment of 1 up to 10 years and in 38,984 cases on forfeit of certain civil rights.

=== Estonian ===
- Aleksander Laak - Commander of Jägala concentration camp. Escaped to Canada via unknown ratlines in 1948. Indicted in a 1960 trial in Estonia and committed suicide the same year.

=== French ===
- Philippe Pétain - Sentenced to death, later commuted to life in prison, died in 1951
- Pierre Laval - Sentenced to death and executed in 1945

=== German ===
- Otto Abetz – Sentenced to 20 years' imprisonment in 1949, appealed in 1952, released in 1954
- Richard Baer – Sturmbannführer, commander of the Auschwitz I concentration camp. Lived under the pseudonym of Karl Neumann after the War. Then discovered in 1960 and arrested.
- Klaus Barbie – Sentenced to life imprisonment in 1987, died after serving four years' imprisonment
- Heinz Barth – Convicted in 1983 for his involvement in the Oradour-sur-Glane massacre; released in 1997; died in 2007
- Rudolf Batz – Lived for 15½ years after the war under assumed identity; captured at Bielefeld in November 1960; hanged himself in prison before trial
- Alois Brunner – Escaped, worked for the Gehlen Organization
- Friedrich Christiansen – Arrested, tried and convicted of war crimes and sentenced in 1948 to 12 years' imprisonment in Arnhem; Released prematurely in December 1951 on grounds of ill health; Died in Aukrug, Germany on December 3, 1972.
- Kurt Christmann – SS-Obersturmbannführer and commander of Einsatzkommando 10a in Krasnodar, Russia; Arrested, tried and convicted under Article 6 of the IMT Statute (Crimes Against Humanity) and sentenced to 10 years' imprisonment on December 19, 1980; Died on April 4, 1987.
- Luise Danz – Female guard at various concentration camps, including Plaszów, Majdanek, Auschwitz-Birkenau, and Malchow. Danz was brought to trial in 1996, but the charges were dismissed due to her advanced age and unfitness to stand trial
- Anton Dostler – Executed by an American firing squad in Italy on December 1, 1945
- Adolf Eichmann – Lived for years in Argentina, captured by Israeli agents in 1960, convicted of high crimes against the Jewish nation and humanity, in Israel, and executed on June 1, 1962.
- Albert Forster - Gauleiter of Danzig-West Prussia, he was sentenced to death in Poland in 1948 and hanged in Warsaw on February 28, 1952.
- Karl Hermann Frank - A Sudeten German, he was the Higher SS and Police Leader in the Protectorate of Bohemia-Moravia and oversaw the Lidice massacre. Sentenced to death in Czechoslovakia, he was hanged May 22, 1946, in Prague.
- Karl Frenzel – An Oberscharführer who served at Sobibór extermination camp. Frenzel aided in the implementation of the Final Solution, taking part in the industrial-scale extermination of thousands of prisoners as part of Operation Reinhard. Sentenced to life imprisonment in 1966 but released in 1982 due to his ill health.
- Arthur Greiser - Gauleiter of Wartheland, he was sentenced to death for genocide in Poland and hanged in Poznań on July 21, 1946.
- Friedrich Hildebrandt - Gauleiter of Mecklenburg, he was sentenced to death by the U.S. military for issuing orders to shoot parachuting U.S. airmen, and was hanged in Landsberg prison on November 5, 1948.
- Hermann Höfle - Higher SS and Police Leader in Slovakia, sentenced to death and hanged in Bratislava on December 9, 1947.
- Friedrich Jeckeln - The Higher SS and Police Leader in Southern Russia and then in the Baltics, he was sentenced to death in the Riga Trial on February 3, 1946, and executed by hanging the same day.
- Herbert Kappler – Sentenced by Italy to life imprisonment in 1947. Escaped from prison in 1977, then died in 1978
- Fritz Knochlein – Responsible for Le Paradis massacre in 1940, tried, convicted, and hanged by the forces of the United Kingdom in 1949.
- Erich Koch - The Gauleiter of East Prussia and Reichskommissar in Ostland and in Ukraine. He was sentenced to death in March 1959 in Poland but this was commuted to life imprisonment, and he died November 12, 1986.
- Reinhold Kulle - SS guard at the Gross-Rosen concentration camp in Poland. Immigrated to the United States in 1957. Found guilty of lying on his immigration application by concealing his role in the SS, and deported to West Germany in 1987, where he was set free.
- Hanns Ludin - SA general and German ambassador to Slovakia, sentenced to death and hanged in Bratislava on December 9, 1947.
- Kurt Meyer – Sentenced to death by a Canadian military court, later reduced to life imprisonment, then to 14 years' imprisonment, served 10 years.
- Martin Mutschmann - Gauleiter of Saxony, he was sentenced to death in the Soviet Union in January 1947 and executed by firing squad in Moscow on February 14, 1947.
- Emanuel Schäfer – SS-Oberführer; BdS in Serbia and northern Italy; sentenced to six-and-a-half years' imprisonment in 1953; released 1956.
- Walter Schmitt – Chief of the SS Personnel Main Office, he was sentenced to death in Czechoslovakia and hanged in Dablice, Prague on September 18, 1945.
- Willy Tensfeld – SS and Police Leader "Oberitalien-West," he was charged with war crimes against Italian partisans. Acquitted by a British military tribunal in April 1947.
- Robert Heinrich Wagner - Gauleiter of Baden and Chief of Civil Administration in Alsace, he was known as the "Butcher of Alsace." Sentenced to death in France in May 1946, he was executed by firing squad on August 14, 1946.

=== Hungarian ===
- László Bárdossy – Prime Minister of Hungary from April 1941 to March 1942. Sentenced to death.
- László Deák - Hungarian Colonel involved in the Novi Sad massacre. Later a Waffen-SS Colonel. Sentenced to death.
- Ferenc Feketehalmy-Czeydner - Hungarian General commanded the Novi Sad massacre. Later a Waffen-SS General. Deputy Minister of Defense under Szálasi. Sentenced to death.
- József Grassy - Hungarian General involved in the Novi Sad massacre. Later a Waffen-SS General. Sentenced to death.
- Béla Imrédy – Prime Minister of Hungary 1938–1939. Sentenced to death.
- Károly Beregfy - Hungarian General and Minister of Defense under Szálasi. Sentenced to death.
- Ferenc Szombathelyi - Hungarian Chief of the General Staff September 1941 to April 1944. Sentenced to death.
- Ferenc Szálasi – Arrow Cross Party government Prime Minister of Hungary from October 1944 to March 1945. Sentenced to death.
- Döme Sztójay – Prime Minister of Hungary from March to August 1944. Sentenced to death.
- Gábor Vajna - Interior Minister under Szálasi. Sentenced to death.
- Márton Zöldi - Hungarian gendarmerie commander involved in the Novi Sad massacre. Sentenced to death.

=== Italian ===
- Nicola Bellomo – sentenced to death by firing squad and executed on 11 September 1945.
- Pietro Caruso – sentenced to death by firing squad and executed on 22 September 1944.
- Guido Buffarini Guidi – executed 10 July 1945.
- Pietro Koch – sentenced to execution by firing squad, sentence carried out 4 June 1945.

=== Japanese ===
- Masaharu Homma – convicted of war crimes, sentenced to death, then executed on April 3, 1946.
- Hitoshi Imamura – sentenced to imprisonment for ten years.
- Kiyotake Kawaguchi – imprisoned from 1946 to 1953.
- Tomoyuki Yamashita – sentenced to death, executed on February 23, 1946.

=== Latvian ===
- Edgars Laipenieks - [B.June 25, 1913] Former Olympic athlete (1936 Summer Games 5000m run). Worked for the Latvian Political Police as an administrator of Riga Central Prison for political prisoners during Nazi occupation. "Witnesses who testified in 1982 at a deportation hearing in San Diego said Laipenieks was responsible for ordering the execution there of at least 200 prisoners from 1941 to 1943." Recruited by the CIA in 1960. Moved to the US in 1960 and worked under the name Edgar Laipenieks as a sports coach. In 1985 he moved to La Jolla, California and died March 29, 1998 age 84
- Konrāds Kalējs – A member of the Arajs Kommando.Immigrated to Australia in 1950; moved to the United States in 1959; deported from the United States to Australia in 1994; fled from Australia to Canada in 1995; deported from Canada 1997; moved to England; and then to Australia. Died in Australia in 2001.
- Boļeslavs Makovskis –[b.21 January 1904] Fled from the United States to West Germany in 1987; put on trial in 1990; his trial was quashed.Died 19 April 1996
- Elmārs Sproģis – [b.November 26, 1914] Sproģis was charged with concealing his role as assistant police chief in Nazi-occupied Latvia when he applied for U.S. citizenship in 1950. A witness "said Sprogis ordered him to deliver valuables taken from Jews scheduled to be executed." In 1984, a federal judge ruled the government had failed to prove Sproģis "had helped the Nazis kill Jews in Latvia during World War II." In 1985 his residence was firebombed; he died New York 10 July 1991

=== Lithuanian ===
- Aleksandras Lileikis - Chief of Lithuania's secret police during Nazi occupation. Recruited by the CIA in Munich in 1952. Entered the United States in 1955 and settled in central Massachusetts. Deported to Lithuania in 1996. Died 26 September 2000
- Juozas Kisielaitis - Member of Lithuanian 12th Lithuanian Auxiliary Police Schutzmannschaft, responsible for the murder of thousands of Jews. Fled the US, where he was residing under the name "Joseph" or "Joe" Kisielaitis, for Canada in 1984.
- Kazys Gimzauskas - Second-in-command to Aleksandras Lileikis in the Lithuanian secret police during Nazi occupation. In charge of "interrogating" Jews. Recruited by the CIA. Moved to St. Petersburg, Florida, in 1955. Convicted of genocide but spared prison for health reasons.
- Vladas Zajanckauskas – In 2005 at the age 89, his U.S. citizenship was ordered revoked in 2007. He was ordered to be deported.
- Antanas Mineikis, [died November 1997] age 80. After the war, Mineikis fled Lithuania and settled in the United States. He was deported to Lithuania after he was stripped of his U.S. citizenship in 1992 for concealing his wartime service in a Nazi-led execution squad.
- July 11, 2001 US Department of Justice deportrtion of Algimantas Dailide 80 [Update Jan 14, 2004 — Algimantas Dailide, 82, a retired real estate agent living in Gulfport, Florida, has permanently departed the United States for Germany]

=== Polish ===
- Dmytro Sawchuk - Guard at Trawniki and Poniatowa slave-labor camps, and at Belzec death camp. Became a naturalized US citizen in 1957. Sawchuk fled the United States in 1999 and renounced his citizenship.

=== Russian Soviet Federative Socialist Republic ===
- Tscherim Soobzokov - Schutzstaffel Obersturmführer. Participated in the murder of civilians in the North Caucasus as part of the Schutzmannschaft. Escaped via Vatican and CIA ratlines to the US after the war. Charged with concealing participation in SS and war crimes by the Office of Special Investigations (United States Department of Justice) in 1979.

=== Ukrainian ===
- Teodozy Dak - officer in the Ukrainian Legion of Self-Defense. Convicted in 1972 and died in prison in 1974.
- Yaroslav Hunka - 14th Waffen Grenadier Division of the SS (1st Galician) veteran. Escaped to Canada after the war. Charged in 2023 with participating in the Huta Pieniacka massacre.

== See also ==
- Épuration légale
- List of Most Wanted Nazi War Criminals according to the Simon Wiesenthal Center
- The Ravensbrück trials of the camp officials from the Ravensbrück concentration camp.
- War-responsibility trials in Finland – a series of trials of the Finnish leadership, originally established for war crimes but held without war crime indictments
