= Carl Wurster =

German chemist (1900–1974)

Carl Wurster (2 December 1900, in Stuttgart – 14 December 1974, in Frankenthal) was a German chemist and Wehrwirtschaftsführer (war economy leader) during the Third Reich. He subsequently became one of the leading figures in post-war Germany's industrial life.

== Pre-war career ==
The son of police inspector Carl Wurster and his wife, Clara Sippel Carl Wuster entered the German Imperial Army to serve in the First World War after leaving school. After his war service he studied chemistry at the University of Stuttgart whilst also serving with the Einwohnerwehr, a right-wing militia active in southern Germany. He subsequently took a doctorate in engineering and in 1924 took a post with BASF where he worked closely with Carl Bosch. In 1926 he was made the head of the main inorganic laboratory at IG Farben's Ludwigshafen plant, marrying Margareta Bergmann around the same time (the couple eventually having two daughters).

Wurster rose through the ranks at IG Farben, becoming head of inorganic operations in 1931, chairman of the Inorganic Production Committee in 1933, a director of the company in 1936 and both a full member of the Vorstand and head of Farben's Upper Rhine Business Group.

== Under the Nazis ==
Like his fellow IG Farben executive Georg von Schnitzler, Wurster was close to Dr Carl Ungerwitter, a government chemist with links to leading figures in the Schutzstaffel, and through him Wurster learned in early 1939 that an invasion of Poland was planned for September. Following the German occupation, Wurster went to Poland to inspect the chemical works in that country. Here he was able to determine which could be absorbed by IG Farben and utilised as part of the Nazi war effort. IG Farben was complicit in crimes committed at German Nazi death camp in Auschwitz-Birkenau, leading to the death of an estimated 1.5 million people, according to the Auschwitz museum in Poland.

Wurster was made a Wehrwirtschaftsführer in 1941 and also became a member of the Military Economy Council of the Reich Economic Chamber. This was followed in 1943 by the award of the War Merit Cross first class. He had joined the Nazi Party itself in 1937.

== After the war ==
The occupying Allies initially gave Wurster permission to remain in charge of the plant at Ludwigshafen following the end of the war but in 1947 he was arrested by American authorities to face trial at Nuremberg. However Wurster was acquitted and soon returned to a leading position in German business.

He became chairman of the board at IG Farben in 1952 and successfully led moves to re-establish BASF. In the academic world he was made an honorary professor at Heidelberg University and was awarded the title of honorary doctor or honorary senator by several other German universities. He was recognised by the West Germany government when he was awarded the Great Cross of Merit with Star of the Order of Merit of the Federal Republic of Germany in 1955 and also received the Bavarian Order of Merit. He officially retired from IG Farben in 1965 but continued to be involved on the supervisory boards of a number of other companies, including Robert Bosch GmbH, Allianz and Degussa.

Wurster retained links to those he had worked with as part of the Nazi war machine and on 6 February 1959 as chairman of BASF he hosted a reunion banquet for the veterans of the pre-1945 IG Farben Vorstand. The event was attended by Otto Ambros, Heinrich Bütefisch, Fritz Gajewski, Max Ilgner, Friedrich Jähne, Carl Krauch, Hans Kühne, Wilhelm Rudolf Mann, Christian Schneider and Fritz ter Meer as well as Carl Bosch's widow.
