= Wehrwirtschaftsführer =

Executive title in Nazi Germany

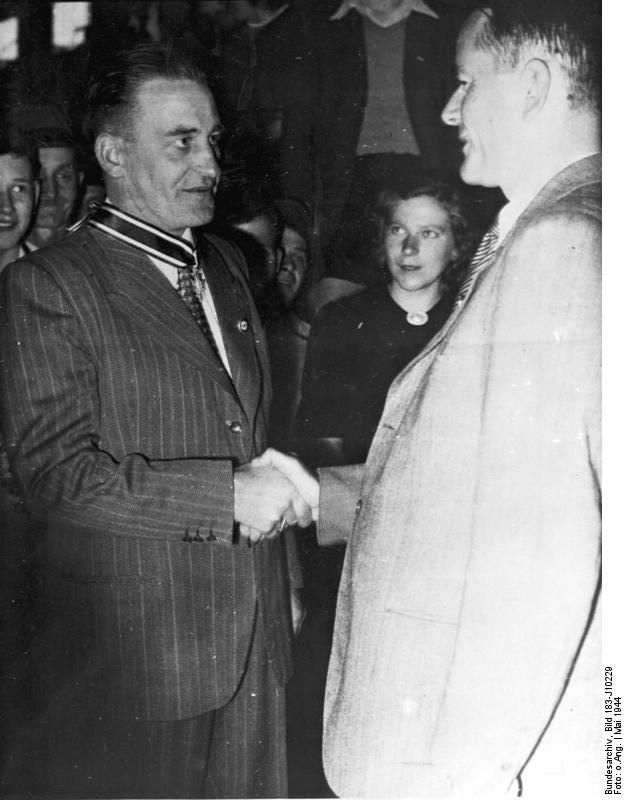
Albert Speer (right) congratulates Wehrwirtschaftsführer Edmund Geilenberg (left) on the bestowal of Ritterkreuz des Kriegsverdienstkreuzes (May 1944)

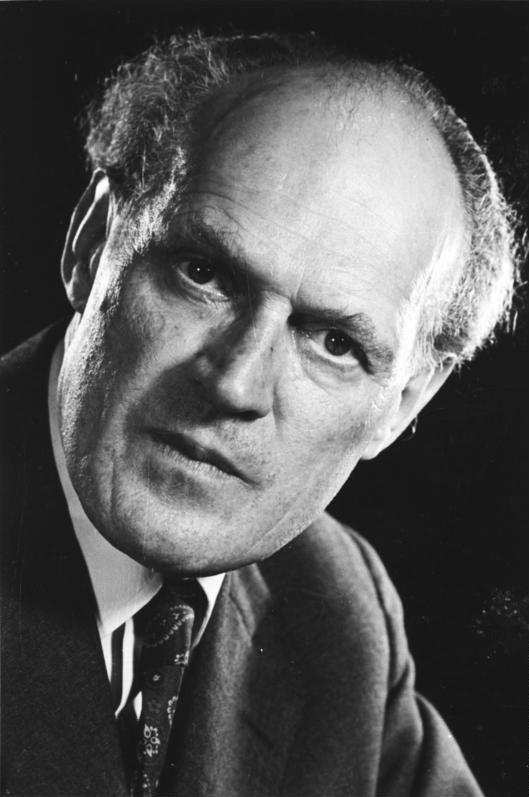
Willy Messerschmitt (1958)

A Wehrwirtschaftsführer (WeWiFü; German language plural: Wehrwirtschaftsführer, English literal translation: Defense Economy Leader) was, during the time of Nazi Germany (1933–1945), an executive of a company or of a large factory (German: rüstungswichtiger Betrieb, lit. 'company important for the production of war materials'). Wehrwirtschaftsführer were appointed, starting in 1935, by the Wehrwirtschafts und Rüstungsamt (department which existed from 1939 for implementing the policy of directing the nation's economic activity towards preparation for and support of the war effort, including armaments) being a part of the Oberkommando der Wehrmacht (OKW), that was pushing the build-up of arms for the Wehrmacht (which was founded in March 1935). Appointments aimed to bind the Wehrwirtschaftsführer to the Wehrmacht and to give them a quasi-military status.

After 1938, the Reich Ministry of Economics appointed the Wehrwirtschaftsführer. From 1940 on, this title was given more and more also to leading employees in companies not belonging to the armament branch, also to demonstrate that those companies were contributing to the wartime economy.

Especially before 1940, appointments did not indicate the political attitude of the person receiving the title. The designation also gave no indication that a given company was important for armaments.

If a manager was appointed Wehrwirtschaftsführer, their company could more easily degrade employment conditions for the workers and employees.

== Appointees ==
- August Bode
- Gustav Böhme, owner of Dr. Ing. Böhme & Co., Metallwarenfabrik, Minden-Lübbeckerstrasse
- Walter Borbet, chief executive officer and general director of the Bochumer Verein coal mining company
- Carl Friedrich Wilhelm Borgward
- William Borm
- Carl Bosch
- Max Brose
- Richard Bruhn (Auto Union)
- Heinrich Bütefisch (I.G. Farben)
- August Diehn (Deutsches Kalisyndikat)
- Carl Martin Dolezalek
- Claude Dornier
- Gerhard Fieseler
- Friedrich Flick
- Fritz Gajewski
- Edmund Geilenberg
- Berthold Geipel, founder of Erfurter Maschinenfabrik (ERMA)
- Alfred Freiherr von Harder
- Ernst Heinkel
- Jost Henkel
- Paul Henrichs (Carl Zeiss, Jena)
- Arthur Hess
- Heinrich Hörlein
- Heinrich Hunke
- Max Ilgner
- Robert Kabelac
- Gustav Köllmann
- Hans Kohnert
- August Kotthaus, Zeiss (company), Jena
- Fritz Kranefuss
- Carl Krauch
- Karl Krekeler
- Alfried Krupp von Bohlen und Halbach
- Gustav Krupp von Bohlen und Halbach
- Heinz Küppenbender (Carl Zeiss, Jena)
- Carl Lautenschläger
- Friedrich Linde, of Linde plc
- Wilhelm Meinberg
- Karl Merck
- Wilhelm Emil Messerschmitt
- Johannes Müller
- Fritz Nallinger
- Heinrich Nordhoff
- Heinrich Notz
- Hans Constantin Paulssen
- Alfred Pierburg
- Paul Pleiger
- Ernst Poensgen
- Ferdinand Porsche
- Jakob Preh
- Günther Quandt
- Philipp Fürchtegott Reemtsma
- Friedrich Reinhart
- Wilhelm Renner
- Fritz Reuther
- Waldemar Rienäcker
- Hermann Röchling
- Alexander Rodenstock
- Willy Sachs
- Eduard Schalfejew
- Hermann Schmitz
- Christian Schneider
- Georg Schnitzler
- Philipp Alois von Schoeller
- Hermann von Siemens
- Hans-Günther Sohl
- Franz Stapelfeldt
- Otto Steinbrinck
- Gerd Stieler von Heydekampf
- Kurt Tank
- Alfred Teves
- Herbert Tengelmann
- Hermann Terberger
- Emil Tscheulin
- Ernst Hellmut Vits
- Wilhelm Voss
- Hans Walz
- Gerhard Alois Westrick
- Ludger Westrick
- Wolf-Dietrich von Witzleben (Siemens)
- Carl Wurster
- Wilhelm Zangen
- Ernst Zindel

== Wehrwirtschaftsführer after the war ==
After the end of the war, most military leaders were punished by the Allies, but were soon reinstated in key posts of reconstruction under Cold War conditions. Symptomatic of this was the return to power of Friedrich Flick, the greatest business leader of the Third Reich and the most prominent leader of the military economy. After seven years of captivity, he again became the greatest entrepreneur of the Federal Republic, awarded the Grand Cross of Merit with shoulder strap and star.

== Literature ==
- Paul Erker: Industrieeliten in der NS-Zeit: Anpassungsbereitschaft und Eigeninteresse von Unternehmen in der Rüstungs- und Kriegswirtschaft, 1936 - 1945. Passau: Wissenschaftsverlag Rothe, 1993, 120 p.
- Kurt Pritzkoleit: Gott erhält die Mächtigen - Rück- und Rundblick auf den deutschen Wohlstand. Düsseldorf: Karl Rauch Verlag, S. 430, pp. 95 -123 (comprehensive list of World War II "Wehrwirtschaftsführer" and their role in German economy and politics which was firmly established again after the war).
