= Heinrich Gattineau =

German economist (1905–1985)

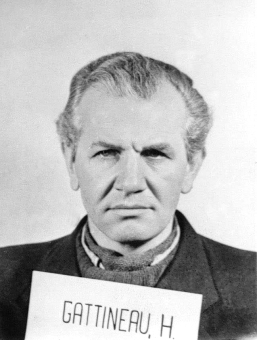
- Gattineau after his arrest by the U.S. Army
- Born: 6 January 1905; Bucharest, Kingdom of Romania
- Died: 27 April 1985 (aged 80)
- Citizenship: German
- Education: Ludwig-Maximilians-Universität München
- Occupation: Business executive
- Employer: IG Farben
- Title: Head of IG Farben Department of Economic Policy
- Term: 1932-1934
- Predecessor: new creation
- Successor: Max Ilgner
- Political party: Nazi Party
- Movement: Sturmabteilung
- Criminal charge: War crimes in the IG Farben Trial
- Criminal penalty: Acquitted
- Spouse: Wera Fritzsche
- Children: five
- Parent: Julius Gattineau (father)

Heinrich Gattineau (6 January 1905 – 27 April 1985) was a German economist, Sturmabteilung (SA) leader, director of IG Farben and defendant during the Nuremberg trials.

== Early years ==
Gattineau was born in Bucharest, the son of Julius Gattineau, a German dentist who had established a practice in Romania. The young Gattineau was initially educated in Switzerland before being sent to high school in Munich, ultimately studying economics at the Ludwig-Maximilians-Universität München, completing his doctorate in 1929. He took a minor role in local politics, serving with the right-wing Bund Oberland in 1923. He married Wera Fritzsche, with whom he had five children, in 1929.

== Dealing with the Nazi Party ==
Gattineau was employed by IG Farben from 1928, becoming head of commercial policy and public relations at the firm in 1931. During the growth of the Nazi Party it was not uncommon for Adolf Hitler to attack IG Farben in his speeches due to the presence of some Jewish executives in prominent positions. Fearing the growth of Hitler and the potential ramifications for the business Carl Duisberg called upon Gattineau, his press secretary at the time, to open contact with the Nazis. Gattineau enlisted the aid of Karl Haushofer, under whom he had studied at university for a time, and after Haushofer vouched for the German credentials of the IG Farben leaders to Hitler the attacks ceased for around a year.

In September 1932, Gattineau, along with Heinrich Bütefisch, had held a meeting with Hitler at which they discussed the issue of producing synthetic oil, something Hitler felt crucial to end German energy dependence and to ensure his plans for secret rearmament would remain secret were he to be elected. By this time Carl Bosch was already providing the Nazi Party with funding. Gattineau's role within IG Farben had grown significantly as in 1932 he had been appointed as head of the newly established Department of Economic Policy (Wipo), an arm of the finance section of IG Farben the purpose of which was to monitor legal, foreign policy and taxation issues that might impact on the relationship between the company and the government.

== Under the Nazis ==
As soon as Hitler came to power Gattineau applied for Nazi Party membership, but he was told he would have to wait as the party was unwilling, initially at least, to accept a rush of business executives whom it felt were only seeking membership for reasons of expediency. Nonetheless, Gattineau took up a part-time role with the SA in an attempt to prove his Nazi credentials. He rose swiftly through the ranks, already holding the rank of SA-Standartenführer by 1934 and being recognised as one of Ernst Röhm's main advisers on economic issues.

Gattineau's closeness to Röhm almost proved his undoing and as the Night of the Long Knives got under way on 30 June 1934 he was dragged from his bed and taken into Gestapo custody under the trumped-up charges that he had diverted money from IG Farben to Röhm in order to fund the supposed plot that was used as justification for the massacre of SA members that ensued. He was interrogated for several hours and feared execution but then was surprisingly released from custody. The reason for his release is uncertain; Max Ilgner later claimed to have used his influence to secure Gattineau's freedom. Equally, it may have simply been the case that Gattineau, as an SA hobbyist, was not considered important enough for the executioners.

Gattineau immediately resigned from the SA but faced anger at IG Farben where his superior Erwin Selck attempted to secure his dismissal or deployment away from the company's main Unter den Linden Berlin offices to the provinces. Bosch rejected this move but, in order to reduce Gattineau's public role, made his Wipo subordinate to Ilgner's operations and before long Gattineau also answered to Ilgner with his press duties. Despite seemingly coming close to being executed Gattineau was admitted to full membership of the Nazi Party in 1935.

He spent much of the Second World War in Bratislava as a director of Dynamit-Nobel-Fabrik and other Czechoslovak chemical companies that had been brought under the IG Farben umbrella by the Nazis.

== Post-war ==
In 1947, Gattineau was one of 24 executives indicted for war crimes by the United States as part of what became known as the IG Farben trial. He was however acquitted of all charges and released. He secured a number of boardroom positions in the corporate world following the trial.

== Bibliography ==
- Diarmuid Jeffreys, Hell's Cartel: IG Farben and the Making of Hitler's War Machine, Bloomsbury, 2009
