= Max Ilgner =

German industrialist

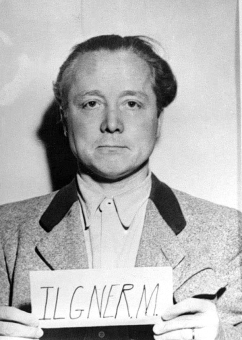
- Ilgner after his arrest by the US Army
- Born: Max Ilgner; 28 June 1899; Biebesheim am Rhein, Grand Duchy of Hesse, German Empire
- Died: 28 March 1966 (aged 66); Schwetzingen, West Germany
- Education: Doctorate in political science
- Alma mater: Goethe University Frankfurt
- Occupation: Business executive
- Employer: IG Farben
- Organization: BASF
- Political party: Nazi Party
- Criminal charges: Spoliation and plunder
- Criminal penalty: Three years imprisonment
- Spouse: Erna Hällström
- Children: Three

Max Ilgner (28 June 1899 – 28 March 1966) was a German industrialist. He was a member of the board of IG Farben and held the title Wehrwirtschaftsführer or war economy leader under the Nazi regime. After the war, he was convicted by the Allies of "spoliation and plunder", but released almost immediately, and continued his career as a political lobbyist and business executive, becoming chairman of a Swiss chemical company.

== Early life ==
Born in Biebesheim am Rhein, Ilgner came from an established military family, with his father and grandfather both officers, and followed in their footsteps by entering cadet school. He briefly served as a junior officer on the Western Front at the very end of the First World War. He then joined the Freikorps for a spell before being discharged from the new Reichswehr after its numbers were substantially reduced by the terms of the Treaty of Versailles.

The demobbed Ilgner took a doctorate in political science at the Goethe University Frankfurt, having also studied metallurgy and chemistry at the Technische Hochschule in Charlottenburg (now Technische Universität Berlin). He briefly worked in Stockholm following completion of his studies and whilst there he met Werna Gudrun Hällström. The two were later married and had three children.

== Rise in IG Farben ==
Despite his extensive qualifications Ilgner found work hard to get in depressed post-war Germany, and so he called on his uncle Hermann Schmitz, the financial chief at BASF, who secured for Ilgner a position as a salesman at the chemical company. In 1926, having worked for BASF for two years, Ilgner was given a new role working with Schmitz at a newly established central finance unit for IG Farben on Berlin's Unter den Linden. Although little more than a messenger boy Ilgner built up a strong network of contacts and, with his uncle's support, advanced through the ranks at the company.

By 1934 Ilgner had been appointed as a deputy member of the Vorstand of IG Farben and had a remit that gave him some control over not only financial and public relations decisions but also the company's dealings with central government. He led two important subsections of the central finance unit, namely the Department of Economic Research (known as Vowi) which was established in 1929 and dealt with overseas investment opportunities and the Department of Economic Policy (Wipo) which was set up in 1932, under Heinrich Gattineau and then Ilgner, to keep an eye on legal, foreign policy and taxation issues that might impact on the relationship between the company and the government.

Ilgner's rapid rise, his naked ambition and the feeling that he was being pushed only because of his family connections made him unpopular with many of his fellow executives but Schmitz held too much power in the company for such objections to be raised publicly.

== Working with the Nazis ==
Ilgner was offered membership of the Nazi Party in 1933 but refused on the grounds that he wished to retain his membership of Rotary International, an organisation that Joseph Goebbels had declared incompatible with Nazism. Nevertheless, Ilgner was happy to work closely with the fledgling Nazi regime and encouraged public support for Nazism by the company's factory workers. He also worked with Goebbels in an attempt to get the Minister of Propaganda to tone down some of his rhetoric, which Ilgner believed was damaging Germany's reputation internationally, an initiative which initially enjoyed some success until Goebbels became angry at Ilgner telling him what to do and broke off communication. Undeterred Ilgner hired the services of the American public relations expert Ivy Lee to improve the reputation of Adolf Hitler on the world stage. After Lee's initial suggestion, the dropping of anti-Semitism, was rejected out of turn by Hitler, they agreed on a programme of presenting Germany as a welcoming, historical destination to American investors whilst also plotting a policy of arranging for pro-Hitler articles to be added to American newspapers. Ilgner's work was criticised by other Vorstand members, who felt that he was undertaking too much government propaganda and not enough work for IG Farben, but his initiatives won Hitler's approval and increasingly IG Farben's overseas offices also became centres of Nazi Party propaganda. In return Ilgner was able to boost IG Farben's contracts with the government, notably their fading Leuna arm which was rejuvenated considerably when Ilgner was able to use contacts in the Reichswehr's Weapons Office to secure for this branch of the company the contract to produce fuel for the Luftwaffe, which was being covertly built up in contravention of the Treaty of Versailles but which would have been discovered had they been forced to import large quantities of aircraft fuel. According to Ilgner's much later claims his influence amongst the Nazi hierarchy even saved the life of Gattineau on Night of the Long Knives after his fellow executive had been arrested due to his membership of the Sturmabteilung and his friendship with Ernst Röhm. Ilgner would finally join the Nazi Party in 1937.

Under Ilgner's direction IG Farben would also play a role in the annexation of the Sudetenland and the dismemberment of Czechoslovakia. Along with fellow executive Georg von Schnitzler Ilgner developed a scheme whereby IG Farben would fund pro-German newspapers in Czechoslovakia. The large scale publication of propaganda stories that accompanied the negotiations between Hitler and Neville Chamberlain helped to whip up strong support for the Nazis amongst the country's German community and the company continued to pour money into Sudeten German Relief Fund and the Sudetendeutsches Freikorps. When the fate of the country was sealed and the Nazis took over IG Farben were rewarded for their part in events by being allowed to take control of Aussiger Verein, a Prague-based chemical company that was the fourth largest in Europe, at a low price.

== World War II ==
Immediately after the outbreak of the Second World War Ilgner handed over the company's extensive collection of geological maps to the government, informing them of the locations across Europe where chemicals might be extracted. As head of Vowi he had also built up extensive knowledge of IG Farben's main overseas competitors and he was able to supply the government with full details of the operations of Imperial Chemical Industries, a British chemical company that Ilgner had one eye on in the event of Operation Sea Lion being launched.

As the war dragged on a Nazi defeat began to look inevitable Ilgner took steps to safeguard his own future. After a bomb struck the Unter den Linten offices in January 1945 Ilgner announced that he could not work under such conditions and, taking all sensitive documented material with him, relocated his office to Frankfurt am Main. In fact Ilgner was simply trying to avoid falling into the hands of the Soviet Union and so moved westwards and whilst in Frankfurt ensured the disappearance of the incriminating documents he had taken with him.

== Post-war ==
Ilgner was one of 24 executives of the company indicted for "spoliation and plunder" by the Americans on 4 May 1947 in what became known as the IG Farben Trial. Ilgner in particular was singled out for the leading role he played in German rearmament and at the trial it was noted that he was the only executive who continued to fraternise openly with Carl Krauch who was bearing the bulk of the guilt due to his close relationship to Hermann Göring. Ilgner was one of nine defendants found guilty of "spoliation and plunder" in 1948, which was defined as the taking of property without the owner's full and non-coerced consent and was sentenced to three years in prison. However, he was released already in the same year.

Ilgner announced his conversion to Christianity in prison and vowed to follow a missionary path following his release. For a time he followed this path, undertaking work on behalf of the Evangelical Church of Westphalia. This did not prove to be long-lived however and instead he became a professional political lobbyist. In 1955 he was appointed the chairman of the board at a chemical company in Zug. He died in Schwetzingen.

== General bibliography ==
- Diarmuid Jeffreys, Hell's Cartel: IG Farben and the Making of Hitler's War Machine, Bloomsbury, 2009
