= IG Farben Trial =

Post-WWII war crimes trial

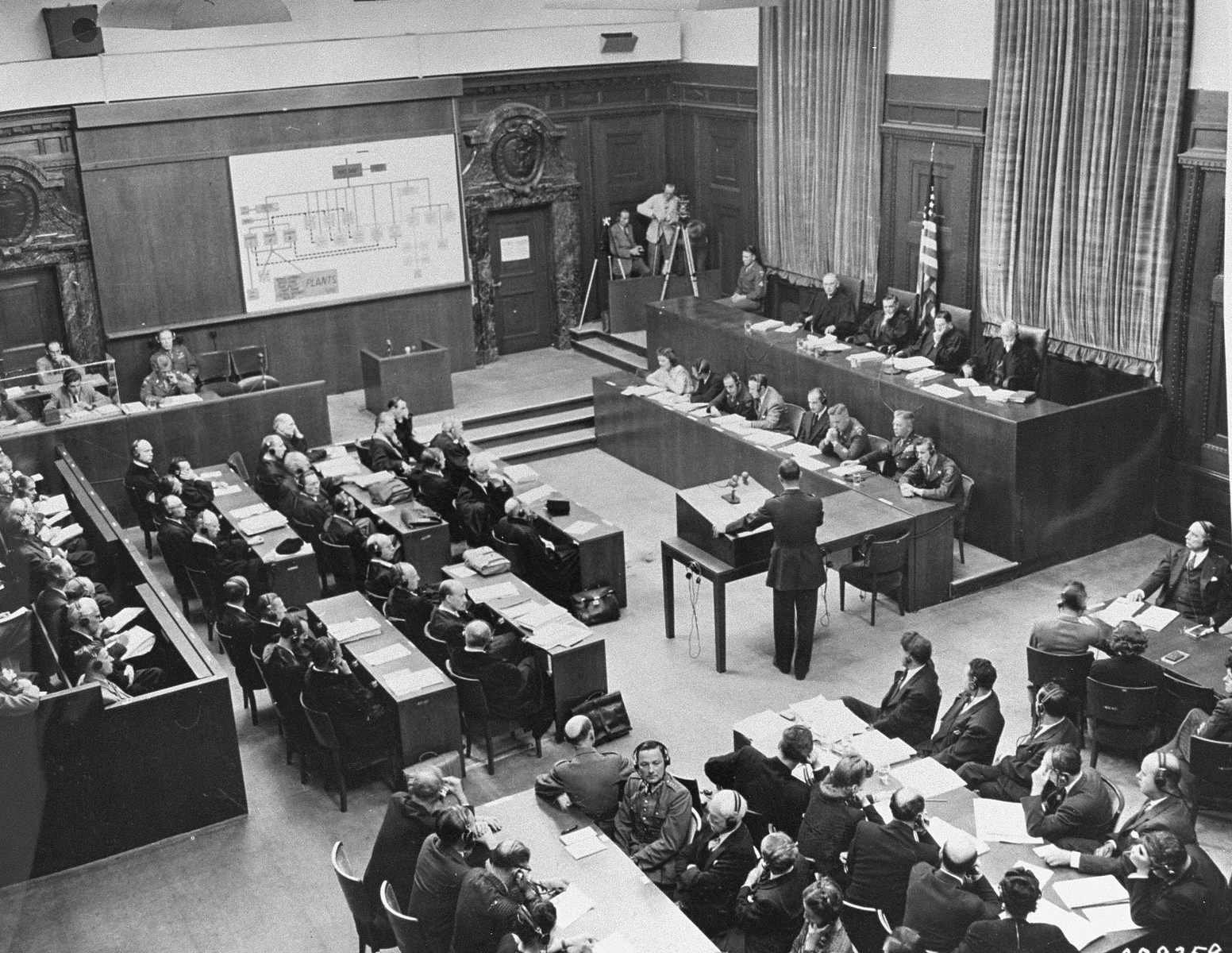
Telford Taylor opens the case against the defendants.

The United States of America vs. Carl Krauch, et al., also known as the IG Farben Trial, was the sixth of the twelve trials for war crimes the U.S. authorities held in their occupation zone in Germany after the end of World War II. IG Farben was the private German chemicals company allied with the Nazis that manufactured the Zyklon B gas used in the genocide of millions of European Jews, Roma, homosexuals, socialists and other innocent civilians in the Holocaust.

The twelve trials were all held before U.S. military courts, not the International Military Tribunal, but took place in the same rooms at the Palace of Justice in Nuremberg. The twelve U.S. trials are collectively known as the "Subsequent Nuremberg Trials" or, more formally, as the "Trials of War Criminals before the Nuremberg Military Tribunals" (NMT). The IG Farben Trial was the second of three trials of leading industrialists of Nazi Germany for their conduct during the Nazi regime, the other two being the Flick Trial and the Krupp Trial.)

The defendants in this case had all been directors of IG Farben, a large German conglomerate of chemical firms. The company had been a major factor already in World War I, when their development of the Haber–Bosch process for nitrogen fixation compensated for Germany's being cut off from the Chilean nitrate trade and allowed IG Farben to produce synthetic nitrate and extract and process nitrogen for use in agricultural fertilizer. Nitrate is also an important component for the fabrication of explosives such as gunpowder, dynamite or TNT. In World War II, Degesch (42.5 per cent owned by IG Farben) was the trademark holder of Zyklon B, the poison gas used at some Nazi extermination camps. IG Farben also developed processes for synthesizing gasoline and rubber from coal, thereby contributing much to Germany's ability to wage a war despite having been cut off from all major oil fields. The charges consequently centered on preparing to wage an aggressive war, but also on the use of slave labor and plundering.

The judges in the case, heard before Military Tribunal VI, were Curtis Grover Shake, former Chief Judge of the Indiana Supreme Court, as presiding judge; James Morris of the North Dakota Supreme Court; Paul M. Hebert, dean of Louisiana State University Law School; and Clarence F. Merrell, a lawyer from Indiana and friend of Judge Shake, as an alternate judge. The Chief of Counsel for the Prosecution was Telford Taylor. The indictment was filed on May 3, 1947, and the trial lasted from August 27, 1947, until July 30, 1948. Of the 24 defendants arraigned, 13 were found guilty on one or the other counts of the indictment and sentenced to prison terms ranging from one and one half to eight years, including time already served; 10 defendants were acquitted of all charges. Max Brüggemann (Farben's chief legal advisor) was removed from the trial and his case discontinued on September 9, 1947, for medical reasons.

== Indictment ==
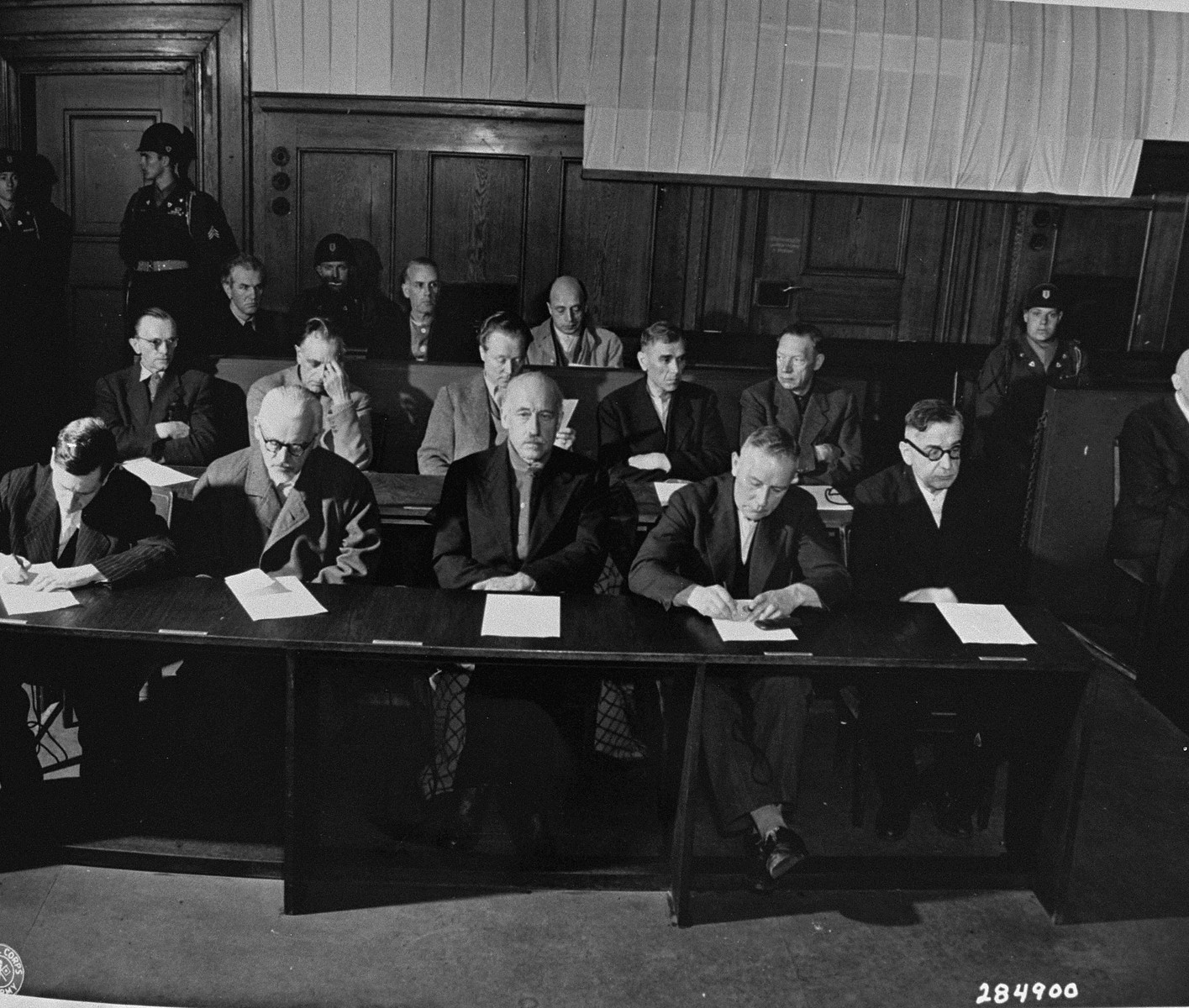
IG Farben defendants read indictments

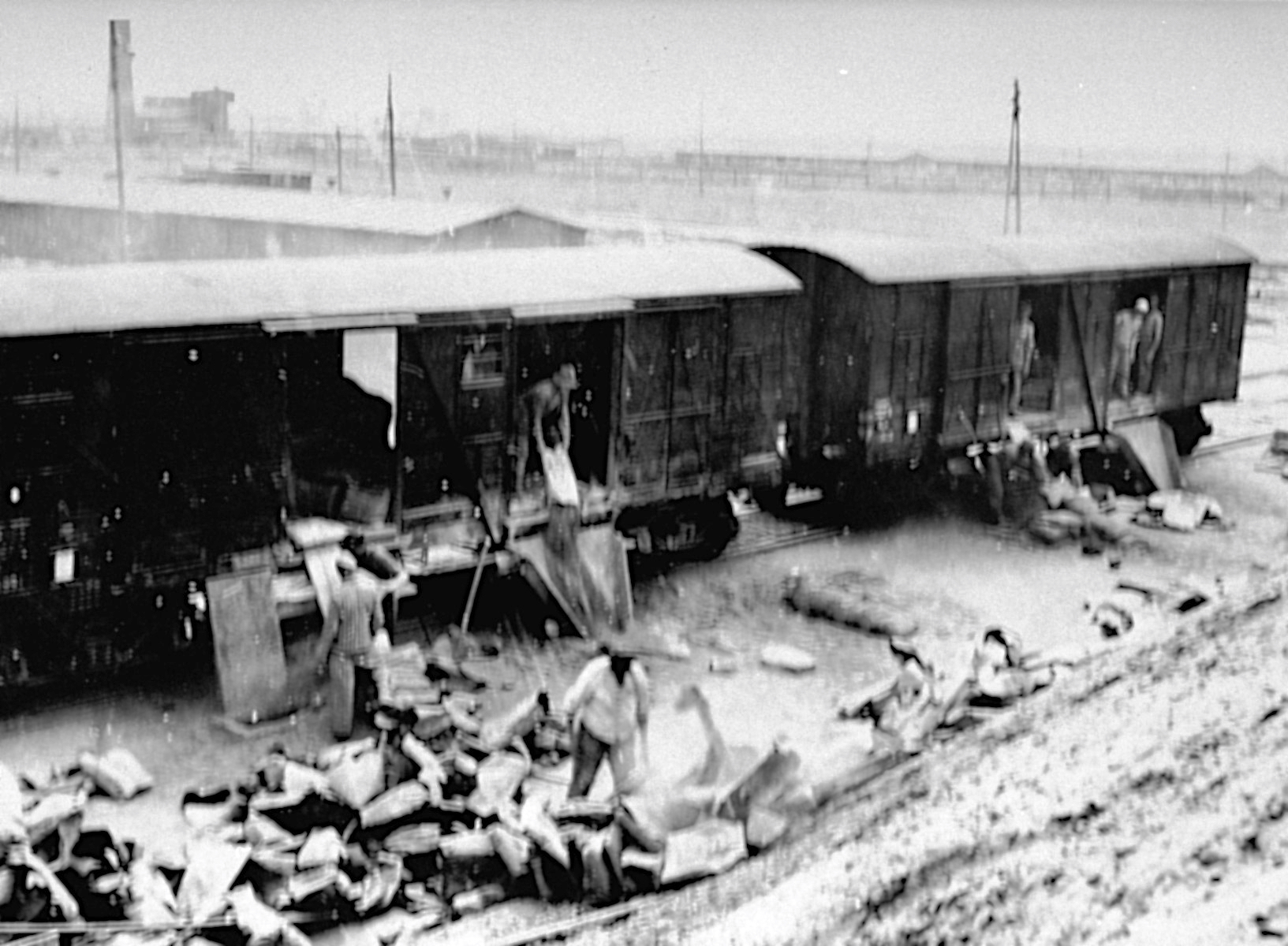
Monowitz prisoners unload cement from trains for IG Farben. Photograph entered into evidence at the trial.

1. Planning, preparation, initiation, and waging of wars of aggression and invasions of other countries.
2. War crimes and crimes against humanity through the plundering and spoliation of occupied territories, and the seizure of plants in Austria, Czechoslovakia, Poland, Norway, France, and Russia.
3. War crimes and crimes against humanity through participation in the enslavement and deportation to slave labor on a gigantic scale of concentration camp inmates and civilians in occupied countries, and of prisoners of war, and the mistreatment, terrorization, torture, and murder of enslaved persons.
4. Membership in a criminal organization, the SS.
5. Acting as leaders in a conspiracy to commit the crimes mentioned under counts 1, 2, and 3.

All defendants were indicted on counts 1, 2, 3, and 5. Only Christian Schneider, Heinrich Bütefisch, and Erich von der Heyde were charged on count 4, "Membership in the SS". The SS had been declared a criminal organization previously by the IMT.

Despite the extensive evidence presented by the prosecution that showed that the company had been deeply involved in Germany's rearmament after World War I from the onset, the tribunal rejected the charges for preparing an aggressive war and for conspiracy to that end. On count three ("slave labor"), the judgement "allowed the defendants the benefit of the defense of 'necessity'" (Telford Taylor, "The Nuremberg War Crimes Trials"; International Conciliation, No. 450, April 1949). Only in the case of Auschwitz, where IG Farben had constructed a plant next to the concentration camp with the clear intent to use inmates as slave workers, did the tribunal consider the evidence sufficient to prove that IG Farben acted on its own initiative. The tribunal concluded that the defendants could be held responsible only for this one case.

Judge Hebert filed a dissenting opinion, in which he argued that the defense of "necessity" did not apply and that all defendants should have been found guilty on count 3 of the indictment. He stated that:

... the record shows that Farben willingly cooperated and gladly utilized each new source of manpower as it developed. Disregard of basic human rights did not deter these defendants.

Willing cooperation with the slave labor utilization of the Third Reich was a matter of corporate policy that permeated the whole Farben organization ... For this reason, criminal responsibility goes beyond the actual immediate participants at Auschwitz. It includes other Farben Vorstand plant-managers and embraces all who knowingly participated in the shaping of the corporate policy.

Judge Hebert filed his statement on December 28, 1948, nearly 5 months after the judgement.

== Defendants ==
Name	Photo	Function	Charges					Sentence
			1	2	3	4	5	
Carl Krauch		Chairman of the Supervisory Board; member of Göring's Office of the Four-Year Plan	I	I	G		I	6 years, including time already served; died 1968
Hermann Schmitz		Chairman of the Managing Board (CEO); member of the Reichstag	I	G	I		I	4 years, including time already served; died 1960
Georg von Schnitzler		Wehrwirtschaftsführer (Military Economy Leader); Captain in the SA	I	G	I		I	5 years, including time already served; died 1962
Fritz Gajewski		Director of AGFA	I	I	I		I	Acquitted; died 1965
Heinrich Hörlein		Head of chemical research	I	I	I		I	Acquitted; died 1954
August von Knieriem		Chief Counsel; Head of the legal department	I	I	I		I	Acquitted; died 1978
Fritz ter Meer		Head of dept. II, which was in charge of the chemical plant in Buna near Auschwitz	I	G	G		I	7 years, including time already served; died 1967
Christian Schneider		Head of dept. I, in charge of nitrogen and gasoline production; head of personnel dept., "supporting member" of the SS	I	I	I	I	I	Acquitted; died 1972
Otto Ambros		Head of the chemical warfare committee at the war ministry; production chief for Buna and Auschwitz	I	I	G		I	8 years including time already served; died 1990
Max Brüggemann		Plant leader	I	I	I		I	Removed from trial for medical reasons
Ernst Bürgin		Plant leader	I	G	I		I	2 years including time already served-died 1966
Heinrich Bütefisch		Production chief at Auschwitz, Obersturmbannführer in the SS	I	I	G	I	I	6 years including time already served; died 1969
Paul Häfliger		Head of the metals department	I	G	I		I	2 years including time already served-died 15 Nov 1950
Max Ilgner		Head of intelligence and propaganda	I	G	I		I	3 years including time already served; died 1966
Friedrich Jähne		Chief engineer	I	G	I		I	1½ years including time already served; died 1965
Hans Kühne		Plant leader	I	I	I		I	Acquitted; died 1969
Carl Lautenschläger		Plant leader	I	I	I		I	Acquitted; died 1962
Wilhelm Rudolf Mann		Pharmaceuticals; member of the SA	I	I	I		I	Acquitted; died 1992
Heinrich Oster		Manager of the Nitrogen Syndicate	I	G	I		I	2 years including time already served; died 1954
Carl Wurster		Plant leader	I	I	I		I	Acquitted; died 1974
Walter Dürrfeld		Head of construction at Auschwitz plant; head of construction at Monowitz (Auschwitz III)	I	I	G		I	8 years including time already served; died 1967
Heinrich Gattineau		Intelligence and plant police	I	I	I		I	Acquitted; died 1985
Erich von der Heyde		Deputy of intelligence and plant police; Hauptsturmführer in the SS, member of the OKW	I	I	I	I	I	Acquitted; died 1984
Hans Kugler		Head of sales for dyestuffs for south-eastern Europe	I	G	I		I	1½ years including time already served; died 1968

I — Indicted G — Indicted and found guilty

The defendants Ilgner and Kugler were released immediately after the judgement since they had already been in custody longer than their sentence.

== Bibliography ==
- Grietje Baars: Capitalism´s Victor´s Justice? The Hidden Stories Behind the Prosecution of Industrialists Post-WWII. In: The Hidden Histories of War Crime Trials. Heller and Simpson, Oxford University Press 2013, ISBN 978-0-19-967114-4.
- Kevin Jon Heller: The Nuremberg Military Tribunals and the Origins of International Criminal Law. Oxford University Press, 2011, ISBN 978-0-19-955431-7.
- Florian Jeßberger: Von den Ursprüngen eines „Wirtschaftsvölkerstrafrechts“: Die I.G. Farben vor Gericht. In: Juristenzeitung. 2009.
- Stefan H. Lindner: Das Urteil im I.G.-Farben-Prozess. In: NMT – Die Nürnberger Militärtribunale zwischen Geschichte, Gerechtigkeit und Rechtschöpfung. Priemel und Stiller, Hamburger Edition 2013, ISBN 978-3-86854-577-7
