= Heinrich Oster =

German chemist and SS officer (1878–1954)

Doctor Heinrich Oster
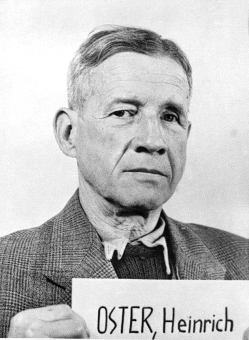
- Oster after his arrest by the U.S. Army
- Born: Heinrich Oster; 9 May 1878; Strasbourg, Reichsland Elsaß-Lothringen, German Empire
- Died: 29 October 1954 (aged 76); Essen, West Germany
- Education: Doctorate in chemistry
- Alma mater: Technische Hochschule Berlin; Friedrich Wilhelm University
- Occupations: Chemist and business executive
- Employer: IG Farben
- Political party: Nazi Party
- Movement: Schutzstaffel
- Criminal charge: Plunder and spoliation
- Criminal penalty: Two years imprisonment

Heinrich Oster (9 May 1878 – 29 October 1954) was a German chemist, executive at BASF and IG Farben and convicted Nazi war criminal.

== Early years ==
Oster was the son of Oberstleutnant Heinrich Oster and served as a volunteer for a year in the army himself in 1898 before studying chemistry at the Technische Hochschule Berlin-Charlottenburg and the Friedrich Wilhelm University in Berlin, obtaining his doctorate in 1905. He immediately went to work for Agfa and remained with them until 1914 when he returned to the army to serve in the First World War. Oster was wounded early in the war, losing his left eye as a result, and so most of his service was as a member of staff to the Commander of the German Army in Alsace, as well as in matters of arms procurement to BASF.

== IG Farben ==
Following the armistice Oster was hired full-time by BASF as a deputy director and he was made a member of the board in 1921. Oster was admitted to the Vorstand of their parent company IG Farben in 1926 as an alternate member and held a number of other posts of responsibility at the company, including membership of the board's Working Committee, the post of managing director of the Nitrogen Syndicate and membership of the Subcommittee for Fertilizers and Explosives. He was promoted to full membership of the board at IG Farben in 1931.

== Under the Nazis ==
Oster recognised the potential for growth of the Nazi movement and was one of the first leading figures in IG Farben to advocate close co-operation with Adolf Hitler's movement. Oster held sponsoring membership of the Schutzstaffel from 1935 to 1939, a position which entitled him to officer rank in the black uniformed movement. He did not become a full member of the Nazi Party itself until 1940. In 1939 he was awarded a First Class War Merit Cross.

== Post-war ==
Oster was arrested by the occupying American forces in 1946 and the following year was charged with war crimes as part of the IG Farben trial. In 1948 he was sentenced to two years imprisonment for "plunder and spoliation".

Following his release in 1949 he took on a position on the board at Gelsenberg AG.
