= Carl Lautenschläger =

German chemist and physician

Carl Lautenschläger M.D.
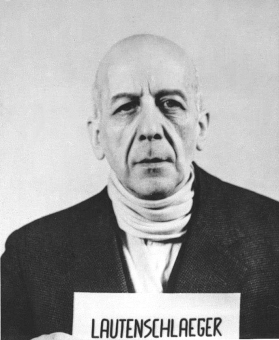
- Lautenschläger after his arrest by the U.S. Army
- Born: Carl Ludwig Lautenschläger; 27 February 1888; Karlsruhe, Grand Duchy of Baden, German Empire
- Died: 6 December 1962 (aged 74); Karlsruhe, Germany
- Education: University of Freiburg
- Occupations: Chemist and physician
- Employer: IG Farben
- Political party: Nazi Party
- Criminal charge: War crimes
- Criminal penalty: Acquitted
- Awards: War Merit Cross

Carl Ludwig Lautenschläger (27 February 1888 in Karlsruhe – 6 December 1962 in Karlsruhe) was a German chemist and physician. He was tried during the IG Farben Trial but was acquitted.

== Early life ==
Lautenschläger was the son of Ludwig Lautenschläger, an architect and his wife Paula Schober. He was trained in pharmacy before studying chemistry, medicine and pharmacy at a number of universities, receiving his doctorate in engineering from the Karlsruhe Institute of Technology in 1913. Lautenschläger served for a year in the German Imperial Army before returning to medical study, eventually receiving his MD from the University of Freiburg in 1919. He followed an academic career initially, becoming a non-tenured professor of pharmacy at the University of Greifswald in 1920.

== Joining Farben ==
In 1920 he was taken on at Hoechst AG's pharmaceutical department and by 1922 was in charge of the company's Science Office. He became an alternate member of the managing board of parent company IG Farben in 1931 as well as a member of their Pharmaceutical Main Assembly. Having initially concentrated his research on developing drugs to fight diabetes Lautenschläger's remit now broadened to take in the production and development of drugs for vaccination and pest control.

== Under the Nazis ==
Lautenschläger became a member of the Nazi Party in 1938. At the same time his duties at IG Farben expanded further as he took over the management of the company's Mittelrhein/Maingau Operating Unit and their Höchst plant. With this increased remit Lautenschläger was also admitted to full membership of the board. He was made a Wehrwirtschaftsführer in 1942 and presented with a First Class War Merit Cross.

According to Diarmuid Jeffreys Lautenschläger became aware of the Holocaust in 1943 after junior colleagues who had witnessed gassings told him about their experiences.

== Post-war ==
Arrested by the American Military Government in 1946 he was brought before the IG Farben trial the following year on charges of mass murder and slavery. The court stated that the pharmaceutical department had been responsible for sending drugs to the Schutzstaffel in order that they be tested on prisoners but ruled that Lautenschläger himself was not personally to blame and so acquitted him.

Like many of his colleagues at IG Farben he was taken under the wing of Bayer chairman Ulrich Haberland, who gave him a job as a research associate at the company's Elberfeld facility. He retired in 1952 and died ten years later.
