= Erich von der Heyde =

German SS officer (1900–1984)

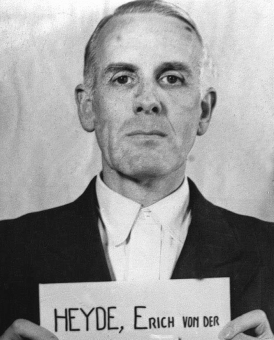
Erich von der Heyde at the Nuremberg Trials

Erich von der Heyde (1 May 1900 – 5 August 1984) was a German agronomist at IG Farben, an SS-Hauptscharführer and a defendant at the IG Farben Trial in Nuremberg. He was found innocent at these trials.

== Life ==
Erich von der Heyde was born on 1 May 1900 in Hong Kong, then a British colony. The von der Heyde family moved to Germany in 1906, where he attended school in Bremen and Weimar until May 1918. He served in the military until the end of World War I, after which he studied agronomy for five years at the Technical University of Munich. In 1925, he worked for a hailstorm insurance company. He changed jobs in 1926, joining the agricultural department of IG Farben in Ludwigshafen. In 1934, he joined the SS mounted unit, the Reitersturm, and left it in 1936. However, he was still a member of the SS. He joined the Nazi Party in 1937.

During 1936, von der Heyde became the advisor for nitrogen and agriculture in the Political-Economic Policy Department (WIPO, Wirtschaftspolitische Abteilung) of the I.G. in Berlin. From mid-1938 he was also the counterintelligence operative of I.G. Farben's “NW 7” (intelligence) office, where his duties included counterintelligence and taking action against breaches of secrecy. In addition, he passed on reports from abroad that appeared to be of general interest, distributing them internally at the I.G. and sending them to the Wehrmacht. In this capacity, he was borrowed by the Reich Main Security Office (RSHA, Reichssicherheitshauptamt) and by 1940 had been promoted to Hauptscharführer. In September 1940, he was called up for service in the Wehrmacht, and until the war's end he served in the military-economic branch of the War Economy and Armament Office (Wehrwirtschafts- und Rüstungsamt; and later the War Economy Staff, or Wehrwirtschaftsstab).

=== Post-war ===
In 1948 at the IG Farben Trial in Nuremberg, von der Heyde was acquitted on the charges of plundering, spoliation, and mass murder. Unlike many SS members, he was not charged with membership in a criminal organization (the SS), because the SS-Reitersturm had not been classified as criminal.

== Bibliography ==
- Jens Ulrich Heine: Verstand & Schicksal: Die Männer der I.G. Farbenindustrie A.G. (1925-1945) in 161 Kurzbiographien. Weinheim, Verlag Chemie, 1990. ISBN 3527281444
