= Otto Ambros =

German chemist (1901–1990)

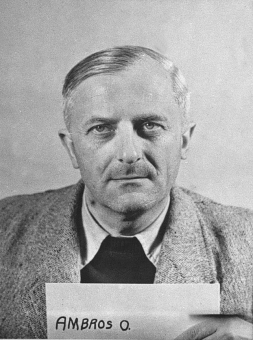
- At the Nuremberg Trials, taken by the US Army
- Born: 19 May 1901; Weiden in der Oberpfalz, Kingdom of Bavaria, German Empire
- Died: 23 July 1990 (aged 89); Mannheim, Baden-Württemberg, West Germany
- Education: Ludwig-Maximilians-Universität München
- Known for: Discovery of sarin
- Scientific career
- Fields: Synthetic rubber, organophosphate insecticides and nerve agents
- Workplaces: IG Farben, BASF

Otto Ambros (19 May 1901 – 23 July 1990) was a German chemist and Nazi war criminal. He is known for his wartime work on synthetic rubber (polybutadiene, or "Buna rubber") and nerve agents (sarin and tabun). After the war he was tried at Nuremberg and convicted of crimes against humanity for his use of slave labor from the Auschwitz III–Monowitz concentration camp. In 1948, he was sentenced to 8 years' imprisonment, but released early in 1951 for good behavior.

== Early life ==
The son of a university professor, Ambros attended school and passed his Abitur exam in Munich. In 1920, he went to the Ludwig-Maximilians-Universität München to study chemistry and agricultural science. In 1925, he gained a doctorate, studying under the 1915 Nobel Prize for Chemistry winner, Richard Willstätter.

== IG Farben and Nazi activities ==
Beginning in 1926, Ambros worked at BASF in Ludwigshafen. In 1930, he spent a year studying in the Far East. From 1934, he worked at IG Farben, becoming head of their Schkopau plant in 1935. He joined the Nazi Party in November 1938. His division of IG Farben developed chemical weapons, including the nerve agents sarin (in 1938) and soman (in 1944). In this capacity, Ambros was an advisor to Carl Krauch, a company executive. The name sarin is an acronym of the initials of the discoverers, with Ambros being the "a".

Ambros then managed the IG Farben factories at Dyhernfurth, which produced tabun (a nerve agent similar to sarin), and at Gendorf, which produced mustard gas (a poison gas originally developed and used in World War I). The Dyhernfurth factory included a slave labor concentration camp with about 3000 prisoners who were used for the most hard and dangerous work at the plant, and as human test subjects in nerve gas experiments.

At IG Farben, Ambros also helped research how to produce polybutadiene rubber, which they gave the trade name "Buna rubber" because it is made using butadiene and sodium (Na). This was an important project because the war cut off Germany from raw materials for natural rubber, and in June 1944, Ambros was awarded a prize of one million marks by Adolf Hitler in recognition of this work. In 1941, Ambros selected the site for the Monowitz concentration camp and the Buna Werke factory, which produced Buna rubber using slave labor from the Auschwitz camp, and he then spent the rest of the war serving as plant manager of Buna-Werk IV and managing director of the synthetic fuel production facility at IG Auschwitz.

In 1944 Ambros was awarded the Knight's Cross of War Merit Cross.

== Monowitz ==
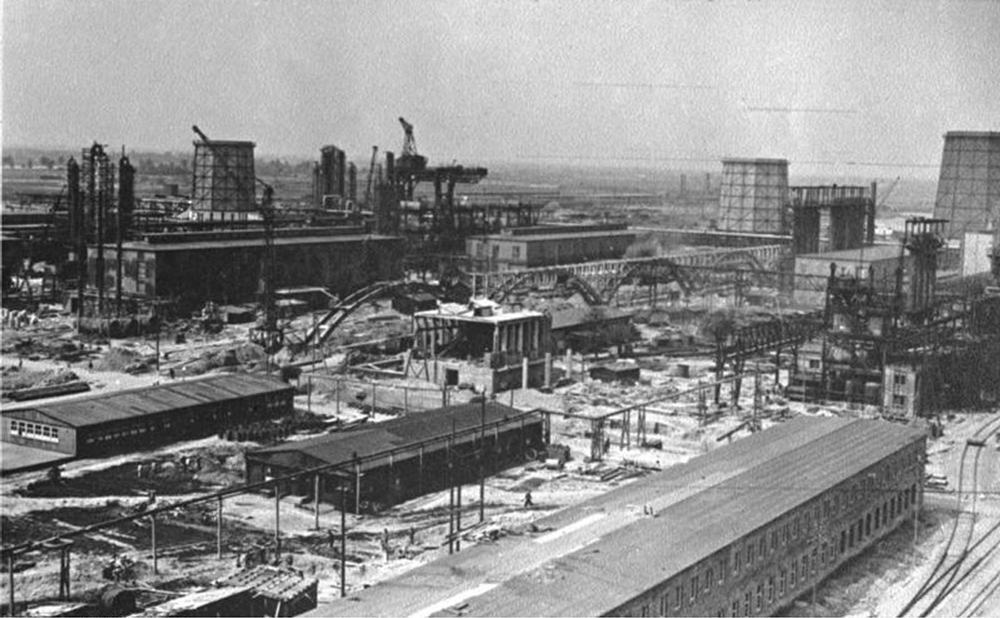
IG Farben plant at Monowitz under construction approximately 10 kilometres (6.2 mi) from Auschwitz, 1942

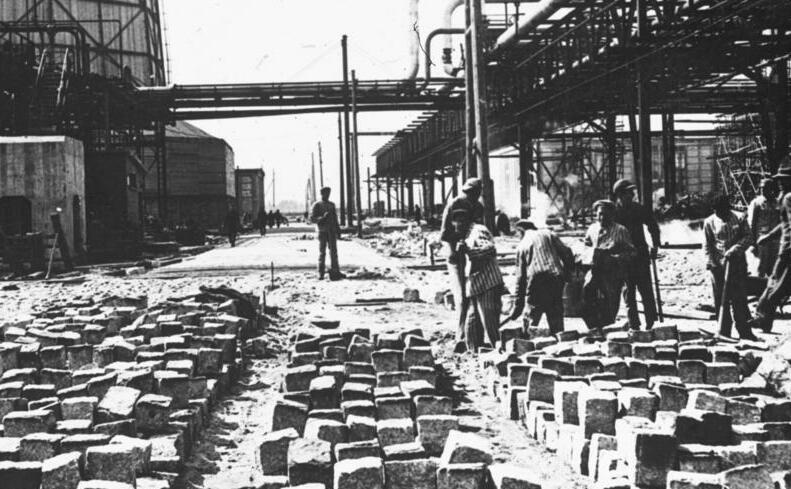
Concentration camp prisoners, identified by striped clothes at work in Monowitz

Ambros was arrested by the US Army in 1946. At the IG Farben trial in Nuremberg in 1948, Ambros and 23 other IG Farben executives were charged with waging wars of aggression; plunder and spoliation; and slave labor and mass murder. He was found guilty on the slave-labor count only, for his role overseeing the IG Buna Werke rubber plant at Monowitz, and sentenced to eight years' confinement. Ultimately he was released early from Landsberg Prison in 1951.

Monowitz was built as an Arbeitslager (workcamp); it also contained an "Arbeitsausbildungslager" (Labor Education Camp) for non-Jewish prisoners perceived not up to par with German work standards. It held approximately 12,000 prisoners, the great majority of whom were Jewish, in addition to non-Jewish criminals and political prisoners. Prisoners from Monowitz were leased out by the SS to IG Farben to labor at the Buna Werke, a collection of chemical factories including those used to manufacture Buna (synthetic rubber) and synthetic oil. The SS charged IG Farben three Reichsmarks (RM) per day for unskilled workers, four RM per hour for skilled workers, and one and one-half RM for children. By 1942 the new labour camp complex for IG Farben prisoners occupied about half of its projected area, and the expansion was for the most part finished in the summer of 1943. The last 4 barracks were built a year later. The labour camp's population grew from 3,500 in December 1942 to over 6,000 by the first half of 1943. By July 1944 the prisoner population was over 11,000, most of whom were Jews. Despite the increasing death-rate from slave labour, starvation, executions or other forms of murder, the demand for labour was growing, and more prisoners were brought in. Because the factory management insisted on removing sick and exhausted prisoners from Monowitz, people incapable of continuing their work were murdered at the death camp at Birkenau nearby. The company argued that they had not spent large amounts of money building barracks for prisoners unfit to work. The Buna camp was described in the writings of Primo Levi, the Italian Jewish chemist and Auschwitz survivor.

=== Release from prison ===
Otto Ambros was released from prison in 1951 due to good behaviour. He became an advisor to chemical companies such as W. R. Grace, Dow Chemical, as well as the U.S. Army Chemical Corps, and Konrad Adenauer. He was also advising Chemie Grünenthal (now Grünenthal GmbH) in the development of thalidomide.
