= Christian Schneider =

German chemist (1887–1972)

Standartenführer Christian Schneider Ph.D
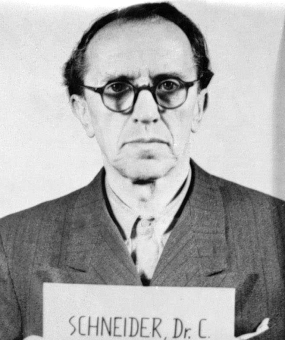
- Schneider after his arrest by the U.S. Army
- Born: Christian Schneider; 19 November 1887; Karlsruhe, Bavaria, Germany
- Died: 5 May 1972 (aged 84); Heidelberg-Ziegelhausen, West Germany
- Education: University of Erlangen-Nuremberg
- Occupation: Chemist
- Employer: IG Farben
- Political party: Nazi Party
- Movement: Schutzstaffel
- Criminal charge: War crimes
- Criminal penalty: Acquitted
- Spouses: Frieda Butzengeiger; Hedwig Breidenbach
- Children: Four

Christian Schneider (19 November 1887 – 5 May 1972) was a Nazi German chemist, industrial manager and, in the Third Reich, a Wehrwirtschaftsführer (war economy leader). He was tried, and ultimately acquitted, for war crimes and his role in the Holocaust.

== Early years ==
The son of August Schneider, an electrician, and his wife, Babette Weiss, Schneider studied chemistry at the University of Erlangen-Nuremberg, completing his doctorate in 1911. He began working with Alwin Mittasch at the nitrogen laboratory at BASF in 1912 and remained in this role until joining the German Imperial Army in 1914, being injured during the conflict.

== Career at IG Farben ==
Schneider became Carl Krauch's assistant at the IG Farben plant in Leuna in 1919 and soon rose through the corporate ranks. He was appointed an authorised signatory in 1921, a director two years later and became deputy manager of the Ammoniakwerke Merseburg plant in 1924. By 1928 he had been named an alternate member of IG Farben's managing board and was made plant manager at Merseburg in 1936.

== Nazi activities ==
Soon after Adolf Hitler came to power Schneider sought to underline his commitment to Nazism by becoming a sponsoring member of the Schutzstaffel. He held the rank of honorary Standartenführer within the organisation and developed a number of close contacts in the office of the Reichsführer-SS Heinrich Himmler. He joined the Nazi Party proper in 1937 and also became involved in the counter-intelligence work of the Abwehr when he was made Hauptabwehrbeauftragter (head of security officers) for "Liaison Office W" (or Wehrmacht at IG Farben's headquarters in Berlin that same year).

His career growth continued when he was appointed the head of Product Division I (which controlled IG Farben's mining, oil and nitrogen concern) in succession to Krauch, a post which brought with it full membership of the board. He became chief of plant managers in 1939, a role which also gave him responsibility for the slave labourers who worked on behalf of IG Farben at Auschwitz. He was made chief of counter-intelligence at IG Farben in 1940 and a Wehrwirtschaftsführer in 1941. According to Diarmuid Jeffreys, Schneider was made aware of the Holocaust in early 1943 when Walter Dürrfeld told him during a visit to Buna Werke in early 1943.

== Post-war ==
Brought to trial for plunder, slavery and SS membership at the IG Farben trial, Schneider was acquitted on all counts. After his acquittal, he took roles at the Süddeutsche Kalkstickstoff-Werke AG Trostberg and Rheinauer Holzhydrolyse-GmbH, Mannheim.

During his life Schneider was twice married, to Frieda Butzengeiger and Hedwig Breidenbach, and fathered four children.

== Bibliography ==
- Diarmuid Jeffreys, Hell's Cartel: IG Farben and the Making of Hitler's War Machine, Bloomsbury, 2009
