= Erika Flocken =

German physician (1912–1965)

Erika Flocken (12 November 1912 – 4 April 1965) was a chief doctor in the Mühldorf subcamp.

== Background ==
During World War II, Flocken worked for the Todt Organization. From June 1944 to April 1945, she was the head doctor of the Mühldorf subcamp. Flocken banned medical means to prisoners, limiting also the number of prisoners in camp hospitals. She also disregarded the poor sanitary conditions in Mühldorf. Flocken participated in the selection of prisoners who were later transported to Auschwitz-Birkenau for gassing.

Flocken was tried in the Mühldorf trial by the American Military Tribunal in Dachau. She was sentenced to death by hanging for war crimes. However, the verdict was later changed to a life sentence, which was reduced to 38 years in 1956. She was released from the prison in Landsberg on parole on 29 April 1957.
