= Georg Fleps =

Romanian war criminal

Georg Fleps (born 19 June 1922) was a Romanian-born Sturmmann and assistant gunner to Hans Siptrott, serving in the Waffen-SS under Joachim Peiper. He was found guilty of war crimes in the Malmedy Massacre during the Battle of the Bulge and sentenced to death in 1946. The sentence was commuted to 20 years on appeal.

Georg Fleps was born in Romania on 19 June 1922. He was interviewed and appears in archival footage in a documentary, Über Galgen wächst kein Gras (No grass grows over the gallows), released in 2005. (at Minute 35:44). Fleps is the defendant Nr. 14.
