= Hans Kühne =

German chemist and businessman (1880–1969)

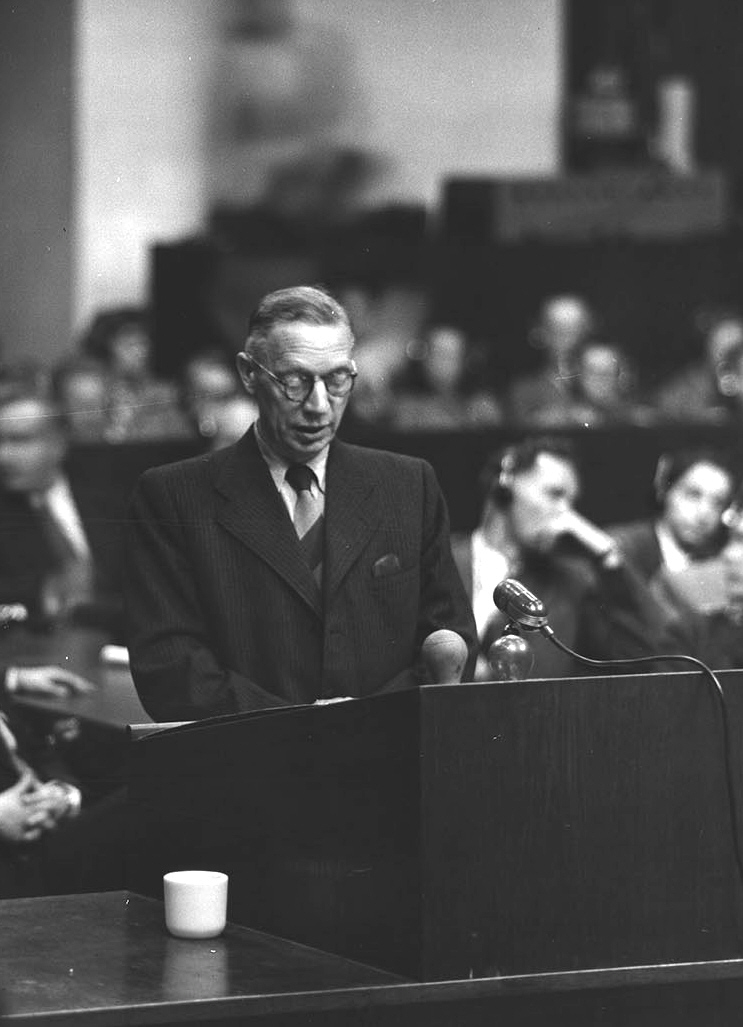
- Kühne at the IG Farben Trial (June 1948)
- Born: 3 June 1880; Magdeburg, Province of Saxony, German Empire
- Died: 18 February 1969 (aged 88); Lindau, West Germany
- Education: Chemistry degree
- Alma mater: University of Leipzig
- Occupations: Chemist; Business executive
- Employer: Bayer (IG Farben)
- Organization: Freemasonry
- Political party: Nazi Party
- Board member of: Bayer; IG Farben
- Criminal charge: War crimes (IG Farben Trial)
- Criminal penalty: Acquitted
- Spouse: Helene Bucerius
- Children: Four
- Parent(s): Julius and Elisabeth Kühne

Hans Kühne (3 June 1880 – 18 February 1969) was a German chemist on the board of IG Farben and a defendant during the IG Farben Trial.

== Early years ==
The son of Julius and Elisabeth Kühne, Hans Kühne enrolled in the University of Leipzig to study chemistry in 1903, graduating in 1906. He took a job with Chemische Fabrik Marienhütte after university but changed employer several times in the following years, as well as serving in the German Imperial Army in France for a spell in 1915 as part of the First World War. In 1916 he took on a position with Bayer where he flourished, developing a process for the production of sulfuric acid and being awarded his doctorate by the University of Cologne. He was appointed an alternate member of the Bayer board in 1923, a post he held until 1926 when he left to take on full membership of the board at IG Farben.

== IG Farben ==
Kühne first came to attention within IG Farben in the late 1920s when he called for a change in the company structure. He suggested that the company's major product lines should all be centralised at Frankfurt and that for each line a commercial executive should be appointed to work closely with a product manager in order to help secure a greater share of the world market for the company. He also argued for a restructuring at boardroom level, calling for a reduction in the number of senior executives and for those in charge to have greater power. Throughout the late 1920s and the early 1930s Kühne's suggestions were taken on board and helped determine a new structure for IG Farben's business practices.

== Serving Nazi regime ==
Kühne was an enthusiastic supporter of the Nazi regime from the moment it took office. As manager of IG Farben's Leverkusen plant, he immediately took up the suggestion that the traditional May Day holiday should instead be celebrated as a new Nazi holiday for industrial excellence. He equally encouraged involvement in other unusual government initiatives, such as regular air raid drills that were brought in 1933 despite Germany not being at war with anyone. He promptly joined the Nazi Party after being sponsored by Robert Ley although in 1934 he was summarily expelled from the party for his involvement in Freemasonry.

Kühne would later gain promotion to the post of chief of production for organic and inorganic chemicals at IG Farben and immediately following the signing of the Munich Agreement he was one of a number of executives appointed to oversee expansion in the Sudetenland. In this post he played a central role in the rapid remilitarisation of Germany.

== Post-war ==
On 4 May 1947 Kühne, as a member of the managing board of IG Farben, was one of 24 company executives indicted by the United States for their role in rearming Germany and their use of slave labour. He was however acquitted the following year and soon secured a role with the Bayer pharmaceutical research facility in Elberfeld. In an interview after the war Kühne insisted that he had only ever supported the Nazis because he hoped that their policies would lead to job creation.

== Personal life ==
Kühne was married to Helene Bucerius and the couple had four children together.

== Bibliography ==
- Diarmuid Jeffreys, Hell's Cartel: IG Farben and the Making of Hitler's War Machine, Bloomsbury, 2009
