= Wilhelm Rudolf Mann =

German business executive and Nazi (1894–1992)

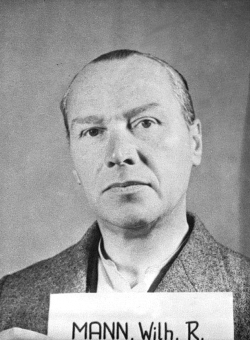
- Mann after his arrest by the US Army
- Born: Wilhelm Rudolf Mann; 4 April 1894; Wiesbaden, Grand Duchy of Hesse, German Empire
- Died: 10 March 1992 (aged 97); Grainau, Bavaria, Germany
- Occupation: Business executive
- Employer: IG Farben
- Political party: Nazi Party
- Criminal charges: Plundering, spoliation and mass murder
- Criminal penalty: Acquitted
- Spouse(s): Else Herrenbrück, Gerda Liefeld
- Children: Two
- Parent(s): Rudolf Mann and Selma Herrenbrück
- Awards: War Merit Cross First Class

Wilhelm Rudolf Mann (4 April 1894 – 10 March 1992) was a German business executive for IG Farben and later with Bayer. He was a supporter and member of the Nazi Party, and was involved in financing the human medical experiments of Josef Mengele at Auschwitz. Following the end of the Second World War, Mann was indicted for war crimes and crimes against humanity in the IG Farben trial, but he was acquitted in 1948.

== Early life ==
Mann was the son of Rudolf Mann, a shipping agent who later became a board member at IG Farben and Bayer, and his wife Selma Herrenbrück. Mann initially received a commercial education in Cologne and served a three-year apprenticeship at an Elberfeld steelworks before serving with the German Imperial Army in the First World War.

Following his military service he studied political economy for a time before entering the sales department at Hoechst, rising quickly through the ranks at the company. In 1926 he went to Leverkusen to being training to ultimately succeed his father at the IG Farben pharmaceuticals and pesticides department and also took a post on the supervisory board of Degesch. He became a director in 1928 and alternate member of the managing board in 1931, gaining full board membership in 1934. Although his progress has been endorsed by his father Mann had also garnered a reputation for his strong knowledge of the international pharmaceutical market as well as his ability to negotiate good deals for IG Farben.

== Under the Nazis ==
Mann joined the Nazi Party in 1931, two years before they came to power, and also joined the Sturmabteilung, the Party's paramilitary organization, achieving the rank of SA-Sturmführer in the brownshirts. At the time of his initial membership Mann was the only member of the Vorstand to hold a Nazi Party card. Mann's membership had lapsed after a year although he quickly renewed his subscription as soon as Adolf Hitler became Chancellor of Germany. Following the Nazi seizure of power, Mann penned a letter which he sent out to 75 of IG Farben's leading international sales representatives across the world. In the letter Mann told the executives that the Nazis had "won a victory against Bolshevism, the enemy of the entire world" and instructed them to tell their clients in their host countries that reports of Nazi repression contained "not a true word".

After the fall of France, Mann attempted to ensure that Bayer could take control of Rhône-Poulenc, the company's main rivals over the border, but his efforts were hampered by the fact that most of the company's bases were in Vichy France rather than the occupied territory. Mann therefore suggested to the directors that they formed a joint sales company, with terms that were much more beneficial to Bayer, but he was rebuffed in his attempt. However, Mann then threatened the company with military action leading to the deal being concluded. In 1944, he was decorated with the War Merit Cross First Class.

=== The Holocaust ===
Due to his role in Degesch, which included regular scrutinising of the company accounts, Mann was privy to information regarding the vast quantities of Zyklon-B that the company supplied to the Schutzstaffel. He thus was also aware that the consumption rate at Auschwitz was ten times the level of other similar sized camps, but he claimed that he never considered any connection between this fact and the Holocaust before later still arguing that he had barely paid any attention to the company accounts in the first place. It was also Mann who personally agreed that IG Farben would finance the research work of Josef Mengele at Auschwitz, which focused on genetics and involved several experiments on sets of identical twins held in the camps.

== Post-war ==
Mann was arrested by the U.S. Army in 1945 and two years later was indicted as part of the IG Farben trial. There he faced the charges of plundering, spoliation and mass murder, but he was acquitted in 1948. The following year, he returned to his earlier role of head of pharmaceutical sales at Bayer. He also returned to market research company GfK, of which he had been president from 1935 to 1945, continuing in this role until 1955, whilst also holding a role on the Foreign Trade Committee of the Bundesverband der Deutschen Industrie.

However, the American Chemical Association notes that all IG Farben pharmaceuticals were marketed under the Bayer trademark. Throughout the Nazi era, Bayer was the control center for IG Farben human experiments. And on 17 February 1999, a lawsuit was filed in U.S. District on behalf of Eva Mozes Kor, one of 180 surviving twin children (out of 1,500) who had been subjected to medical experiments at Auschwitz. The suit charged Bayer of collaborating with Dr. Josef Mengele (the "Angel of Death") to commit medical atrocities for profit. Eventually the case was settled out of court.

Mann had been twice married, initially to his cousin Else Herrenbrück, who bore him two children before her death, and subsequently to Gerda Liefeldt.

== Bibliography ==
- Diarmuid Jeffreys, Hell's Cartel: IG Farben and the Making of Hitler's War Machine, Bloomsbury, 2009
