= Hermann Schmitz =

German businessman and Nazi war criminal (1881–1960)

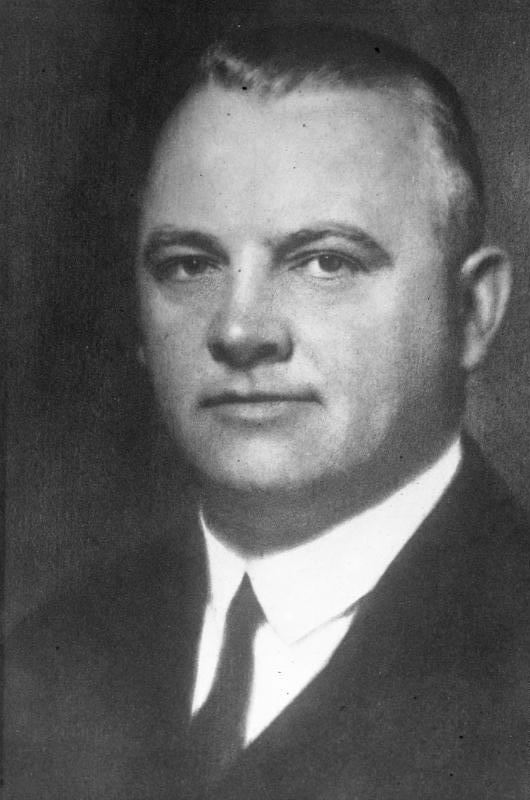
- Schmitz in 1931

Chief Executive Officer, IG Farben
- In office April 1935 – 8 May 1945
- Preceded by: Carl Bosch

Reichstag Deputy
- In office 12 November 1933 – 8 May 1945

Personal details
- Born: 1 January 1881 Essen, Rhine Province, Kingdom of Prussia, German Empire
- Died: 8 October 1960 (aged 79) Heidelberg, West Germany
- Occupation: Industrialist

Military service
- Allegiance: German Empire
- Branch/service: Imperial German Army
- Years of service: 1914–1915
- Rank: Leutnant
- Unit: Infantry Regiment 81
- Battles/wars: World War I
- Awards: Iron Cross, 1st and 2nd class Wound Badge

Hermann Schmitz (1 January 1881 – 8 October 1960) was a German industrialist and Nazi war criminal. CEO of IG Farben from 1935 to 1945, he was sentenced to four years in prison in the IG Farben Trial.

== Early life and war service ==
Schmitz was born in Essen on 1 January 1881, son of factory worker Diedrich Schmitz and Luise Wöhrmann. In 1898, he began studying at Ahrenbergische Aktiengesellschaft für Bergbau und Hüttenbetrieb in Hessen, and in 1905 he entered the Commerce College in Nuremberg. After completing his studies, he was hired by Metallurgische Gesellschaft (metallurgy company), where after some time he became consultant of Wilhelm Merton, member of the supervisors' council of the company, who helped Schmitz promote his career.

In 1914, Schmitz served in the Imperial German Army with Infantry Regiment 81 during the First World War. He was a Leutnant of reserves and was severely wounded in action in October 1914, earning the Wound Badge and the Iron Cross, 1st and 2nd class. After recovering from his injuries, he was made a commissioner in the Prussian War Ministry (War Raw Materials Department) from 1915 to 1916. From 1917 to 1918, he was an economic advisor to the Reich Treasury.

== Interwar years ==
In 1919, as an expert in fertilizers and nitric salts, Schmitz took part in the assembly that negotiated the Treaty of Versailles. There he met Carl Bosch, a chemist of worldwide fame. In July 1919 Schmitz was hired at BASF by Bosch as his financial advisor. He was promoted to administrator of BASF's exterior department, a position he maintained after the company became part of IG Farben. As per his job requirements he maintained contacts with large businesses, such as Standard Oil, with which he took part in negotiations, always having the support of that era's governments in the interests of IG Farben. He was elected to the central committee of the Reichsbank in 1927, and to the administrative board of the Deutsche Reichsbahn in 1929.

== Career in Nazi Germany ==
At the November parliamentary election, Schmitz was elected as a deputy to the Reichstag as a "guest" of the Nazi Party. He was reelected at the March 1936 and the April 1938 elections, and held this seat until the fall of the Nazi regime. He was also made a member of Hans Frank's Academy for German Law. In April 1935, he succeeded Carl Bosch as IG Farben's chief executive officer (CEO). In 1935, he was appointed a war economy leader (Wehrwirtschaftsführer). His company used forced labor in its factories and was involved in the financing and construction of the Auschwitz III concentration camp. In 1941, Hitler gave an autographed portrait of himself to Schmitz as a gift for his dedication to the aims of Nazi Germany. Also in 1941, he received the War Merit Cross, first class, for his contribution to the war effort. Schmitz led IG Farben until the end of the Second World War.

== Post-war prosecution for war crimes ==
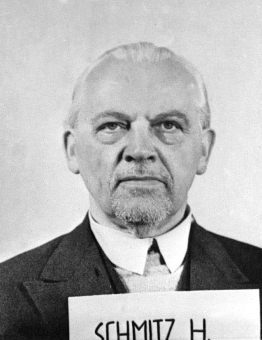
Schmitz after his arrest by the U.S. Army

At the end of the war, Schmitz was arrested and charged at the IG Farben Trial in 1947–1948, in which he was sentenced to four years imprisonment (including time served) for war crimes and crimes against humanity through the plundering and spoliation of occupied territories. He was released in 1950 and went on to become a member of the administrators' council of Deutsche Bank in Berlin, as well as the honorary president of "Rheinische Stahlwerke AG".

Schmitz died in Heidelberg on 8 October 1960.

== Sources ==
- Wollheim Memorial
- Jewish Virtual Library
- Online Academy: Profit over life
- Borkin, Joseph (1 June 1978). The Crime and Punishment of I.G. Farben. Free Press. pp. 250. ISBN 978-0-02-904630-2.
- Higham, Charles (1983) Trading with the Enemy; An exposé of the Nazi – American Money Plot 1933–1949. Robert Hale, London. Chapter 8 'The Film Conspiracy' ISBN 0 7090 10230
