= Fritz Gajewski =

Nazi German businessman (1885–1965)

Dr. Friedrich Gajewski
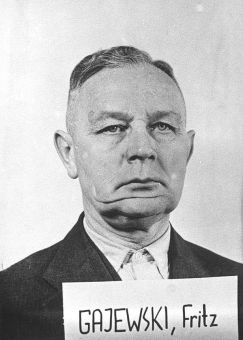
- Gajewski after his arrest by the U.S. Army
- Born: Friedrich Gajewski; 13 October 1885; Pillau, Kingdom of Prussia, German Empire
- Died: 2 December 1965 (aged 80); Cologne, Germany
- Education: University of Leipzig
- Occupation: Business executive
- Employer: IG Farben
- Political party: Nazi Party
- Criminal charge: War crimes
- Criminal penalty: Acquitted
- Spouse: Elisabeth Seckler

Friedrich Gajewski (13 October 1885 – 2 December 1965) was a Nazi German businessman with IG Farben and Wehrwirtschaftsführer (war economy leader) during the Second World War. He was tried for war crimes for his role in the Holocaust and acquitted.

== Early years ==
One of twelve children, Gajewski only had limited schooling due to his family's lack of money but, following the completion of an apprenticeship as a pharmacist, he was able to enrol in the University of Leipzig in 1905 to study chemistry and pharmacy. He completed his doctorate in 1910 and served for a year in the military, as was mandatory at the time. He entered civilian employment in 1912 with BASF but returned to the German Imperial Army in 1914, serving in the First World War until 1917. He was recalled to manage the BASF gas works at Ludwigshafen-Oppau and around this time he married Elisabeth Seckler, eventually fathering two daughters.

== Career at IG Farben ==
Gajewski first came to prominence at IG Farben in 1925 when he was appointed assistant to Carl Bosch and a director of the company in 1925. His career at the company was concentrated on photographic products, with Gajewski appointed technical director of Agfa in 1928 and head of IG Farben's Product Division III (photographic supplies, artificial silk and cellulose-based products) two years later, whilst he was also made a full member of IG Farben's managing board in 1932. These roles required him to work closely with Dynamit Nobel and as such he was on that company's supervisory board from 1936 until 1945.

== Nazi activities ==
Gajewski became a member of the Nazi Party in 1933. Gajewski demonstrated his support for the Nazi Weltanschauung during an incident in late 1938 involving a former colleague at IG Farben. Gerhard Ollendorf, a Jew, had been a member of the board in the early 1930s but had fallen afoul of Nazi laws and in November 1938 told Gajewski that he intended to leave Germany. Although Gajewski wished him luck he immediately wrote to the Gestapo, informing them that Ollendorf was in possession of sensitive information and that it would not be wise to allow him to leave. Ollendorf was prevented from leaving until eventually Gajewski relented and endorsed his departure.

His role as a member of the company's South-East Europe Committee, a post he took up in 1940, made him a regular visitor to IG Farben sites that had been established in occupied and satellite territories such as Hungary, Czechoslovakia, and Romania. His position as a Wehrwirtschaftsführer was confirmed in 1942.

== Post-war ==
Gajewski was arrested by the US Army on 5 October 1945. He was brought before the IG Farben trial in 1947 and, although the case saw details of his denouncing of Jewish members of IG Farben's managing board following the Nazi takeover, he was nonetheless acquitted of war crimes. Indeed, Gerhard Ollendorf had initially written an affidavit in defence of Gajewski, who he believed had aided his departure from Germany, but he withdrew the statement after Gajewski's letter to the Gestapo was discovered and read out in court.

He returned to the business world with Dynamit Nobel, becoming chairman of the company in 1952 and was awarded the Großes Verdienstkreuz the following year by the West German government. He also chaired the boards at Genschow & Co. and Chemie-Verwaltungs AG as well as holding board membership at two other companies. He retired in 1957 and ended his days in the Hahnwald suburb of Cologne.

== Bibliography ==
- Diarmuid Jeffreys, Hell's Cartel: IG Farben and the Making of Hitler's War Machine, Bloomsbury, 2009
