= Heinrich Bütefisch =

German chemist and Nazi war criminal (1894-1969)

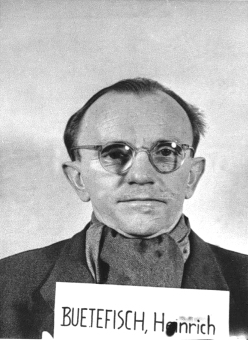
- Born: February 24, 1894; Hanover, German Empire
- Died: September 5, 1969 (aged 75); Essen, North Rhine-Westphalia, West Germany
- Occupation: Chemist
- Employer: IG Farben
- Organization: Freundeskreis der Wirtschaft
- Known for: head of production at the Bunawerke facility at Monowitz, part of the Auschwitz complex of camps
- Awards: Knight's Cross of the War Merit Cross, Grand Cross of Merit of the Federal Republic of Germany
- Status: released
- Criminal charges: War crimes, Crimes against humanity
- Penalty: 6 years including time already served in prison

Details
- Victims: Holocaust victims
- Imprisoned at: Landsberg Prison

Heinrich Bütefisch (24 February 1894, Hanover – 5 September 1969, Essen) was a German chemist, manager at IG Farben, and Nazi war criminal. He was an Obersturmbannführer in the SS.

== World War II ==
As a leading figure in IG Farben, Bütefisch joined the Freunde des Reichsführer-SS, an exclusive group close to Heinrich Himmler whose membership allowed prominent individuals in German society to become effectively SS officers without undergoing rigorous selection or training. He served as one of Nazi Germany's Wehrwirtschaftsführer (war economy leaders) and received the Knight's Cross of the War Merit Cross.

== Monowitz ==
During the IG Farben trial, Bütefisch was convicted in 1948 as a war criminal and sentenced to six years in prison. He was head of production at the Bunawerke facility at Monowitz, part of the Auschwitz complex of camps. The extensive works were to have produced Buna rubber, or polybutadiene for use in rubber tyres. Monowitz was built as an Arbeitslager (workcamp); it also contained an "Arbeitsausbildungslager" (Labor Education Camp) for non-Jewish prisoners perceived not up to par with German work standards. It held approximately 12,000 prisoners, the great majority of whom were Jewish, in addition to non-Jewish criminals and political prisoners. Prisoners from Monowitz were leased out by the SS to IG Farben to labor at the Buna Werke, a collection of chemical factories including those used to manufacture Buna (synthetic rubber) and synthetic oil. The SS charged IG Farben three Reichsmarks (RM) per day for unskilled workers, four (RM) per hour for skilled workers, and one and one-half (RM) for children. By 1942 the new labour camp complex for IG Farben prisoners occupied about half of its projected area, the expansion was for the most part finished in the summer of 1943. The last 4 barracks were built a year later. The labor camp's population grew from 3,500 in December 1942 to over 6,000 by the first half of 1943. By July 1944 the prisoner population was over 11,000, most of whom were Jews. Despite the growing death-rate from slave labor, starvation, executions or other forms of murder, the demand for labor was growing, and more prisoners were brought in. Because the factory management insisted on removing sick and exhausted prisoners from Monowitz, people incapable of continuing their work were murdered. The company argued that they had not spent large amounts of money building barracks for prisoners unfit to work.

== Work conditions ==
On 10 February 1943 SS-Obersturmbannführer Gerhard Maurer, responsible for employment of concentration camp prisoners went to Oświęcim; he promised IG Farben the arrival of another thousand prisoners, in exchange for the incapable factory workers. More than 10,000 prisoners were victims of the selection during the period in which the camp operated. Taken to the main camp's hospital, most victims were killed by a lethal injection of phenol to the heart. Some were sent to Birkenau where they were liquidated after "re-selection" in the Bllf prison hospital or in most cases murdered in the gas chambers. More than 1,600 other prisoners died in the hospital at Monowitz, and many were shot at the construction site or hanged at the camp. Summing up all figures, an estimated total number of about 10,000 Auschwitz concentration camp prisoners lost their lives because of working for IG Farben.

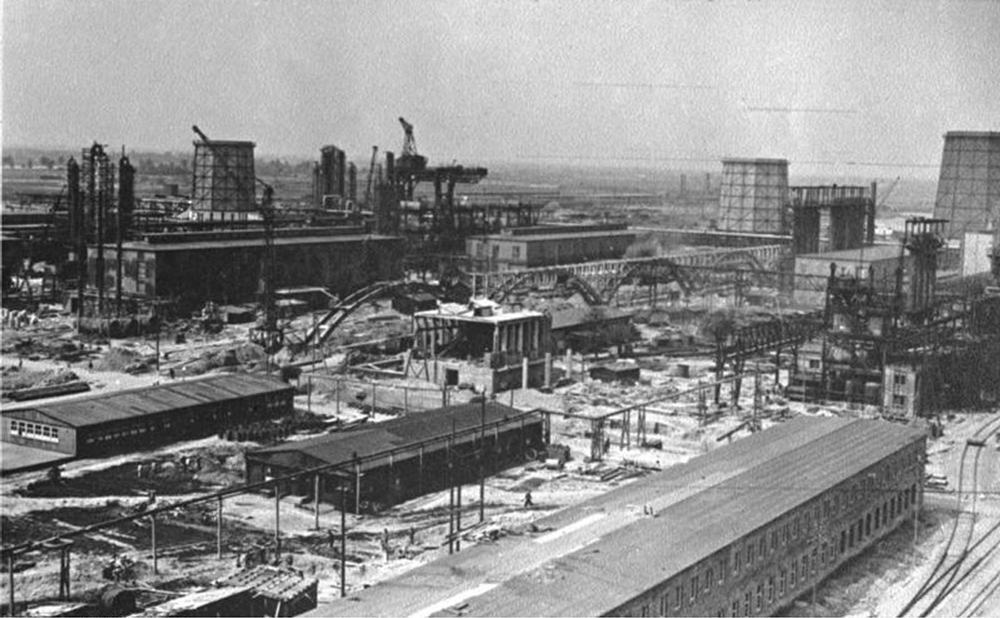
IG Farben plant under construction approximately 10 kilometres (6.2 mi) from Auschwitz, 1942

Primo Levi, author of If This Is a Man, survived Monowitz, and Elie Wiesel, author of the Pulitzer Prize-winning book Night, was a teenage inmate at Monowitz along with his father. The life expectancy of Jewish workers at Buna Werke was three to four months; for those working in the outlying mines, only one month. Those deemed unfit for work were gassed at Birkenau, phrased as sent "to Birkenau" (nach Birkenau), according to a euphemism used in I.G. Farben record books. The chemical works relied on thousands of the concentration camp inmates for forced labour during construction. The poor conditions in which they were held and to which they were subjected while working ensured a high death rate. Bütefisch was also head of operations at Leuna works, a very large producer of synthetic fuel.

== Indictment and trial ==
He was indicted at the Nuremberg IG Farben trial, convicted and sentenced to 6 years including time already served. The reasons for the judgment contain the statement 'Die Ausbeutung der Arbeit von KZ-Insassen ist ein Verbrechen gegen die Menschlichkeit.' (the exploitation of concentration camp inmates is a crime against humanity).

He served his sentence in Landsberg Prison and was released in 1951.

== Later life ==
In 1952, Bütefisch became a member of the supervisory boards for Deutsche Gasolin AG, Feldmühle, and Papier- und Zellstoffwerke AG. He also became a consultant for Ruhrchemie AG Oberhausen, joining its supervisory board in 1952.

In 1964, he was awarded the Grand Cross of Merit of the Federal Republic of Germany (Großes Verdienstkreuz). Protests ensued, so much so that President Heinrich Lübke asked him to return the award.

Bütefisch died on 5 September 1969 in Essen.
