= Termeer =

Termeer, ter Meer, ten Meer are Dutch topographic surname. Notable people with the surname include: Notable people with the surname include: Here 'ter/ten' are tussenvoegsels (surname affix) meaning 'at', 'by', i.e., the surnames mean "by the lake" or "by the sea". Notable people with the surname include:

- Edmund ter Meer (1852–1931), German chemist
- Fritz ter Meer (1884–1967), German chemist, businessman and war criminal
- Henri Termeer (1946–2017), American businessman
- Ilse ter Meer or Ilse Knott-ter Meer (1899–1996), German mechanical engineer

== See also ==
- Ter Meer castle, or simply Ter Meer
