= Carl Duisberg =

German chemist and industrialist (1861–1935)

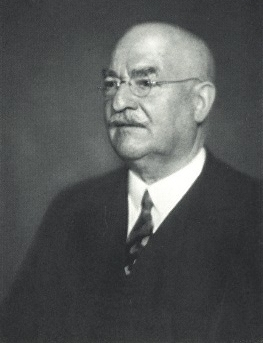
- Carl Duisberg
- Born: 29 September 1861; Barmen, Rhine Province, Prussia
- Died: 19 March 1935 (aged 73); Leverkusen, Germany
- Education: University of Göttingen, University of Jena
- Scientific career
- Doctoral advisor: Anton Geuther

Friedrich Carl Duisberg (29 September 1861 – 19 March 1935) was a German chemist, industrialist and co-founder of I.G. Farben.

== Life ==
Duisberg was born in Barmen, Germany. From 1879 to 1882, he studied at the Georg August University of Göttingen and Friedrich Schiller University of Jena, receiving his doctorate. After military service in Munich, which he combined with research in the laboratory of Adolf von Baeyer, he was hired in 1883 at the Farbenwerke (dye company) of Friedr. Bayer & Co., which later became Bayer AG.

In his career, he became confidential clerk (authorised signatory) and head of research. In 1900, he became the CEO of Bayer. Inspired by Standard Oil on a US tour, Bayer became part of IG Farben, a conglomerate of German chemical industries. Duisberg was head of the supervisory board for IG Farben. He died in Leverkusen.

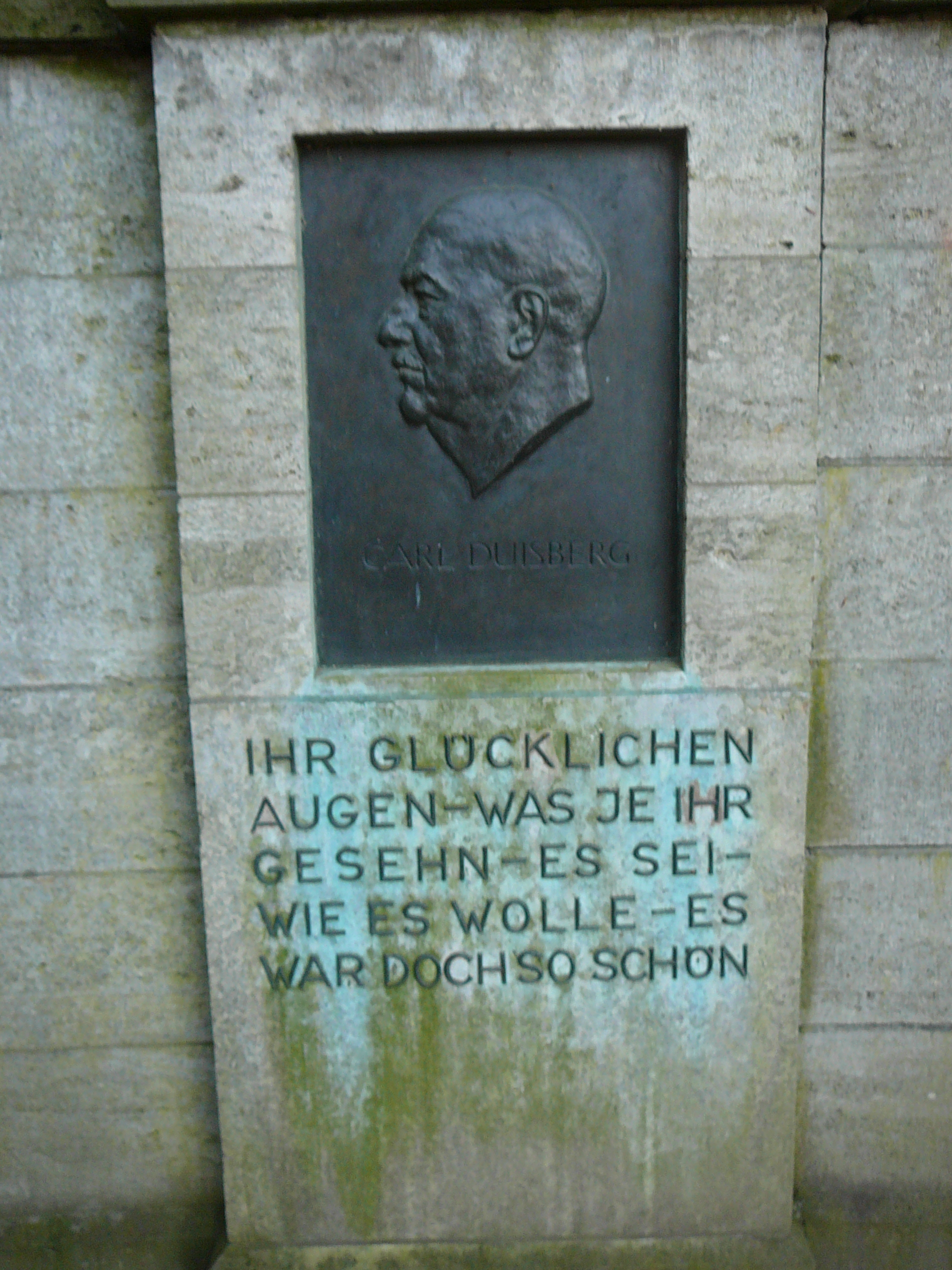
Carl Duisberg memorial plate, Floratempel Leverkusen

== Work ==
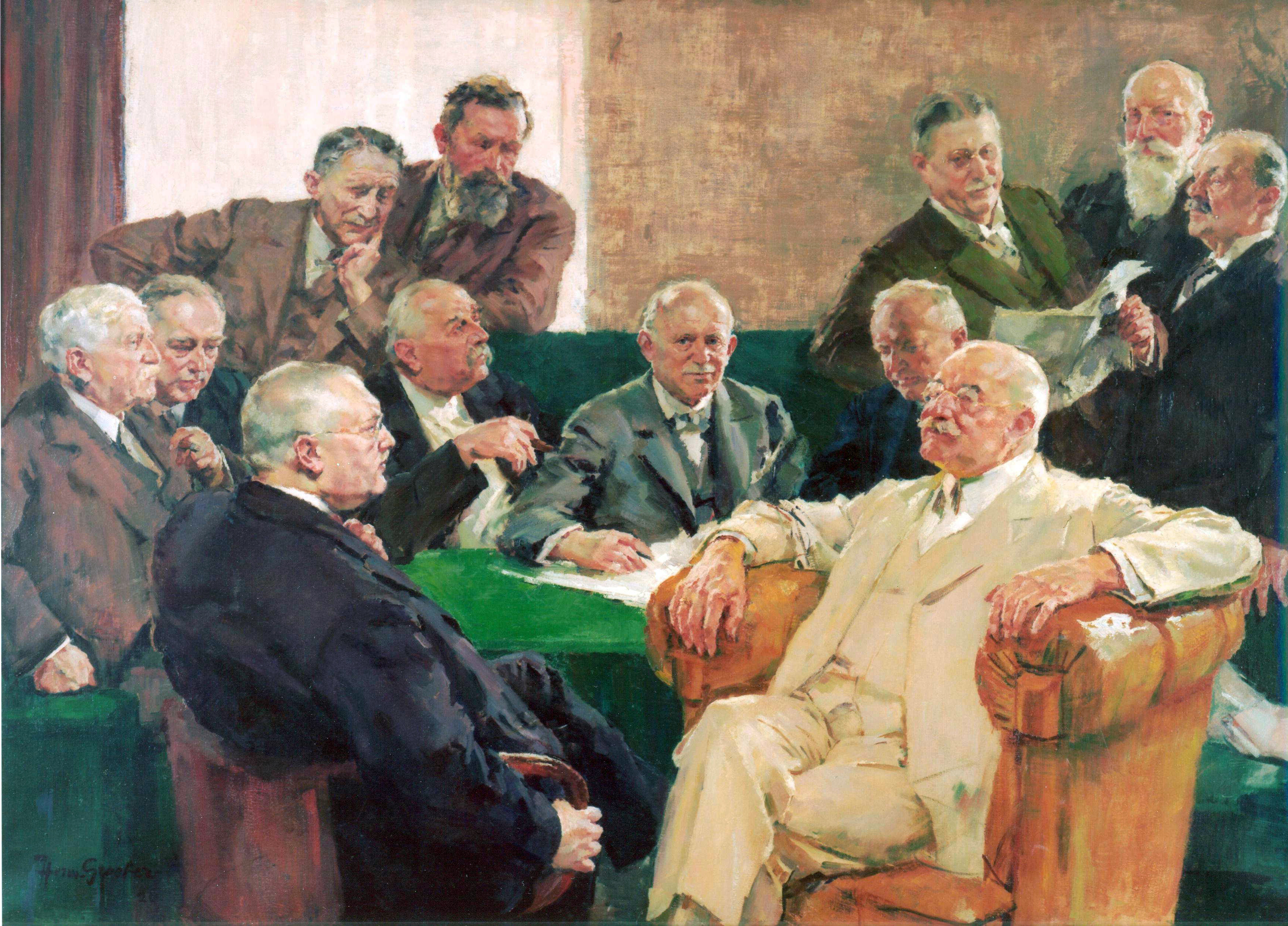
Painting by Hermann Groeber: Der Aufsichtsrat der 1925 gegründeten I.G. Farben AG, Carl Bosch and Carl Duisberg (in front sitting), Edmund ter Meer (third person from right with newspaper)

During World War I, the German army faced a great threat from an ammunition shortage. Indeed, the nitrates that were crucial for the production of gunpowder could not be imported any more because of the blockade by the British Navy. As a result, the German chemical firms (BASF and Bayer among others) were pushed to successfully synthesise nitrates. However, because of the war, shortage in manpower arose, and Duisberg advised Max Bauer on a new solution. In November 1916, Duisberg advised the Kaiser's troops to begin deporting 60 000 people from occupied Belgium; they were put in trains for transport to German mines and factories. Complaints from influential neutral countries, especially the United States, put an end to it. Also, in 1916, General Wilhelm Groener was appointed by General Ludendorff to reduce inflation. He proposed that increases in costs could be absorbed by the chemical community. When Duisberg heard the proposition, he successfully influenced the German government for Groener's removal.

In the 1920s, the dye industry leaders, led by Carl Duisberg of Bayer and Carl Bosch of BASF, successfully pushed for the merger of the dye makers into a single company. In 1925, the companies merged into the Interessengemeinschaft Farbenindustrie AG or IG Farben. The huge corporation, which soon included related industries such as explosives and fibers, was the biggest enterprise in all of Europe and the fourth largest in the world, behind General Motors, United States Steel and Standard Oil of New Jersey.

Duisberg forced the use of chemical weapons during World War I.

One of Duisberg's major achievements was to move Bayer into pharmaceuticals. He supported Gerhard Domagk's successful efforts to discover the first broadly effective antibiotic, Prontosil.

== Carl Duisberg Society ==
The Carl Duisberg Society (Carl Duisberg Gesellschaft) was founded in 1949 and was helping development aid with education programmes for people, especially from developing countries. From 1949 until its merger with the German Society for international Development (Deutschen Stiftung für internationale Entwicklung) in 2002 to form the InWEnt (Internationale Weiterbildung und Entwicklung gGmbH) 300,000 people took part in the programs of the society.
