= Carl Bosch =

German chemist and engineer (1874–1940)

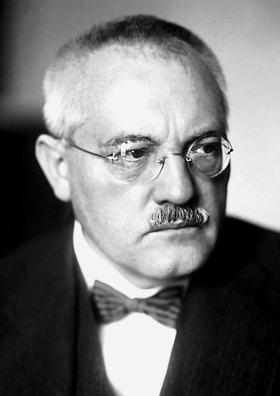
- Bosch c. 1929
- Born: 27 August 1874; Cologne, Germany
- Died: 26 April 1940 (aged 65); Heidelberg, Germany
- Education: Technische Universität Berlin; Leipzig University
- Known for: Bosch reaction Bosch–Meiser urea process Haber–Bosch process
- Awards: Liebig Medal (1919); Werner von Siemens Ring (1924); Nobel Prize in Chemistry (1931); Wilhelm Exner Medal (1932); Goethe Prize (1939)
- Scientific career
- Fields: Chemistry
- Workplaces: BASF, IG Farben
- Doctoral advisor: Johannes Wislicenus

Signature
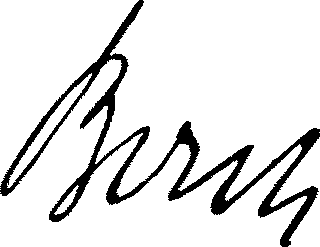

Carl Bosch (German pronunciation: [kaʁl ˈbɔʃ]; 27 August 1874 – 26 April 1940) was a German chemist and engineer and Nobel Laureate in Chemistry. He was a pioneer in the field of high-pressure industrial chemistry and founder of IG Farben, at one point the world's largest chemical company.

He also developed the Haber–Bosch process, important for the large-scale synthesis of fertilizers and explosives. It is estimated that one-third of annual global food production uses ammonia from the Haber–Bosch process, and that this supports nearly half of the world's population. In addition, he co-developed the so-called Bosch-Meiser process for the industrial production of urea.

== Biography ==
=== Early years ===
Carl Bosch was born in Cologne to a successful gas and plumbing supplier. His father was Carl Friedrich Alexander Bosch (1843–1904) and his uncle was Robert Bosch, who pioneered the development of the spark plug and founded the multinational company Bosch. Carl, trying to decide between a career in metallurgy or chemistry, studied at the Königlich Technische Hochschule in Charlottenburg (now Technische Universität Berlin) and the University of Leipzig from 1892 to 1898.

=== Career ===
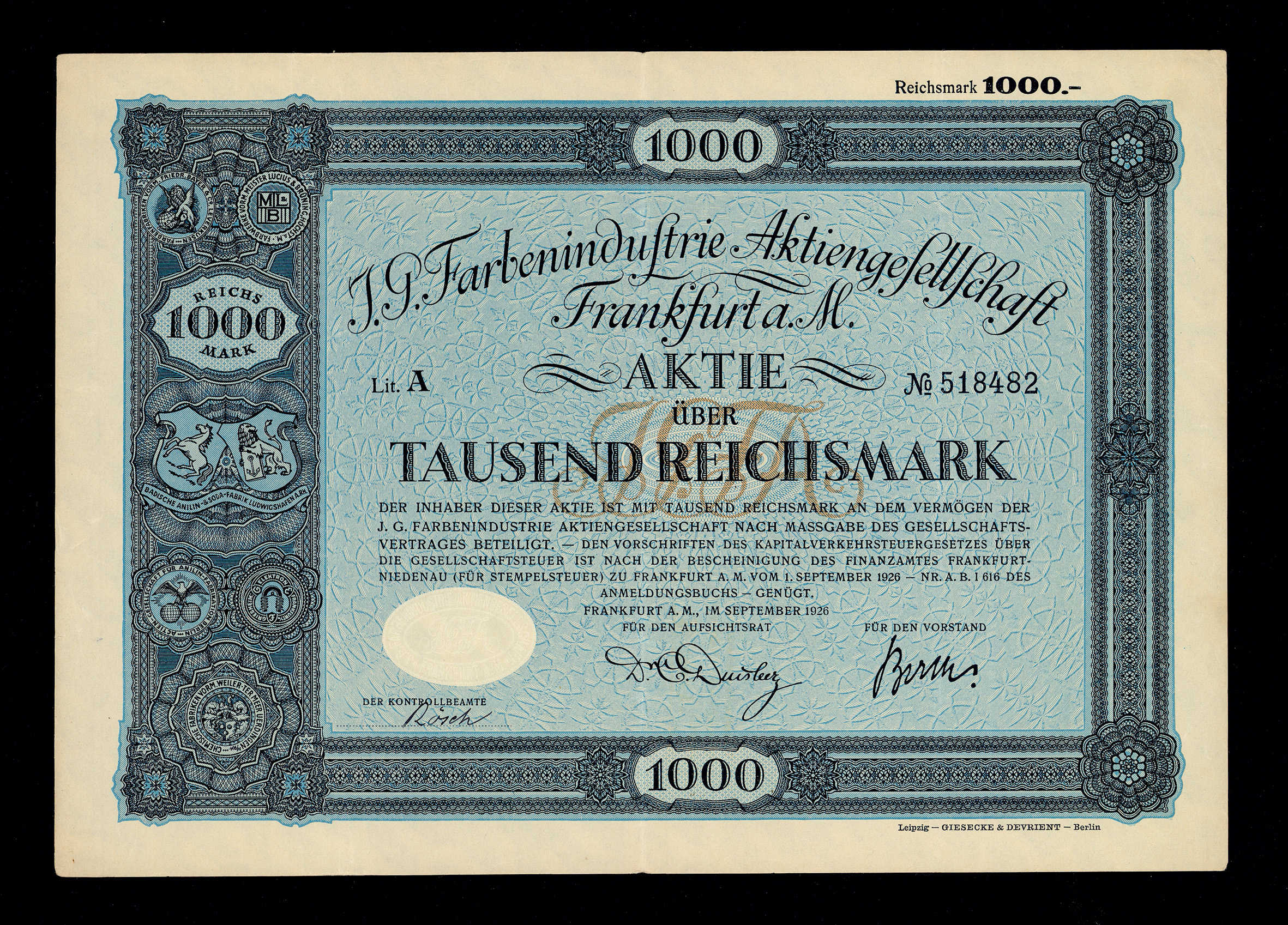
Share of the IG Farbenindustrie AG, issued September 1926; signed by Carl Bosch as chairman

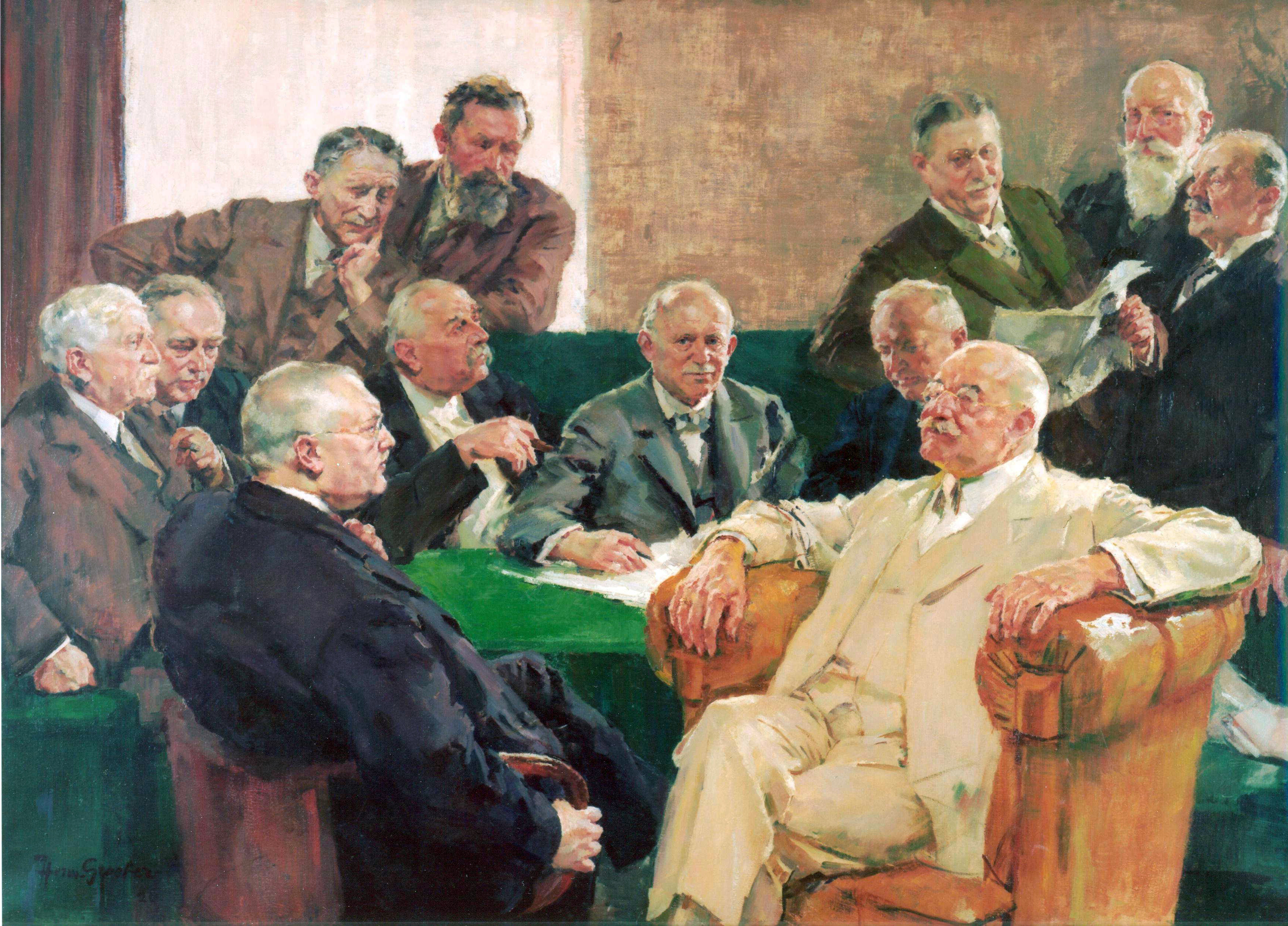
Painting by Hermann Groeber: Der Aufsichtsrat der 1925 gegründeten I.G. Farben AG, Carl Bosch and Carl Duisberg (in front sitting), Edmund ter Meer (third person from right with newspaper)

Carl Bosch attended the University of Leipzig, and this is where he studied under Johannes Wislicenus, and he obtained his doctorate in 1898 for research in organic chemistry. After he left in 1899 he took an entry-level job at BASF, then Germany's largest chemical and dye firm. From 1909 until 1913 he transformed Fritz Haber's tabletop demonstration of a method to fix nitrogen using high-pressure chemistry through the Haber–Bosch process to produce synthetic nitrate, a process that has countless industrial applications for making a near-infinite variety of industrial compounds, consumer goods, and commercial products. His primary contribution was to expand the scale of the process, enabling the industrial production of vast quantities of synthetic nitrate. To do this, he had to construct a plant and equipment that would function effectively under high gas pressures and high temperatures. Bosch was also responsible for finding a more practical catalyst than the scarce osmium and expensive uranium being used by Haber.

There were many more obstacles as well, such as designing large compressors and safe high-pressure furnaces. A means was needed to provide pure hydrogen gas in quantity as the feedstock. Also, cheap and safe means had to be developed to clean and process the product ammonia. The first full-scale Haber–Bosch plant was erected in Oppau, Germany, now part of Ludwigshafen. With the process complete he was able to synthesize large amounts of ammonia, which was available for the industrial and agricultural fields. In fact, this production has increased the agricultural yields throughout the world. This work won him the Nobel prize for Chemistry in 1931.

After World War I Bosch extended high-pressure techniques to the production of synthetic fuel via the Bergius process and methanol. In 1925 Bosch helped found IG Farben, and was the first head of the company.

He received the Siemens-Ring in 1924 for his contributions to applied research and his support of basic research. In 1931 he was awarded the Nobel Prize in Chemistry together with Friedrich Bergius for the introduction of high pressure chemistry. Today the Haber–Bosch process produces 100 million tons of nitrogen fertilizer every year.

In mid-1932, Bosch instructed two IG Farben executives to meet Adolf Hitler in an attempt to stop the Nazi Party's political attacks on the company's synthetic fuel project. In December 1933, the Nazi government granted IG Farben a price and purchase guarantee to expand the production of synthetic oil at Leuna, in a context of increasing state oversight of the company's operations.

Advocating open international cooperation and limited state control over science and industry, Bosch opposed the Nazi regime's autarkic and repressive policies from 1933 onward, which led to his gradual marginalization within IG Farben. From 1935, Bosch was chairman of the board of directors, a role that has become largely ceremonial as he was increasingly sidelined from operational decision-making under the Nazi regime.

== Personal life ==
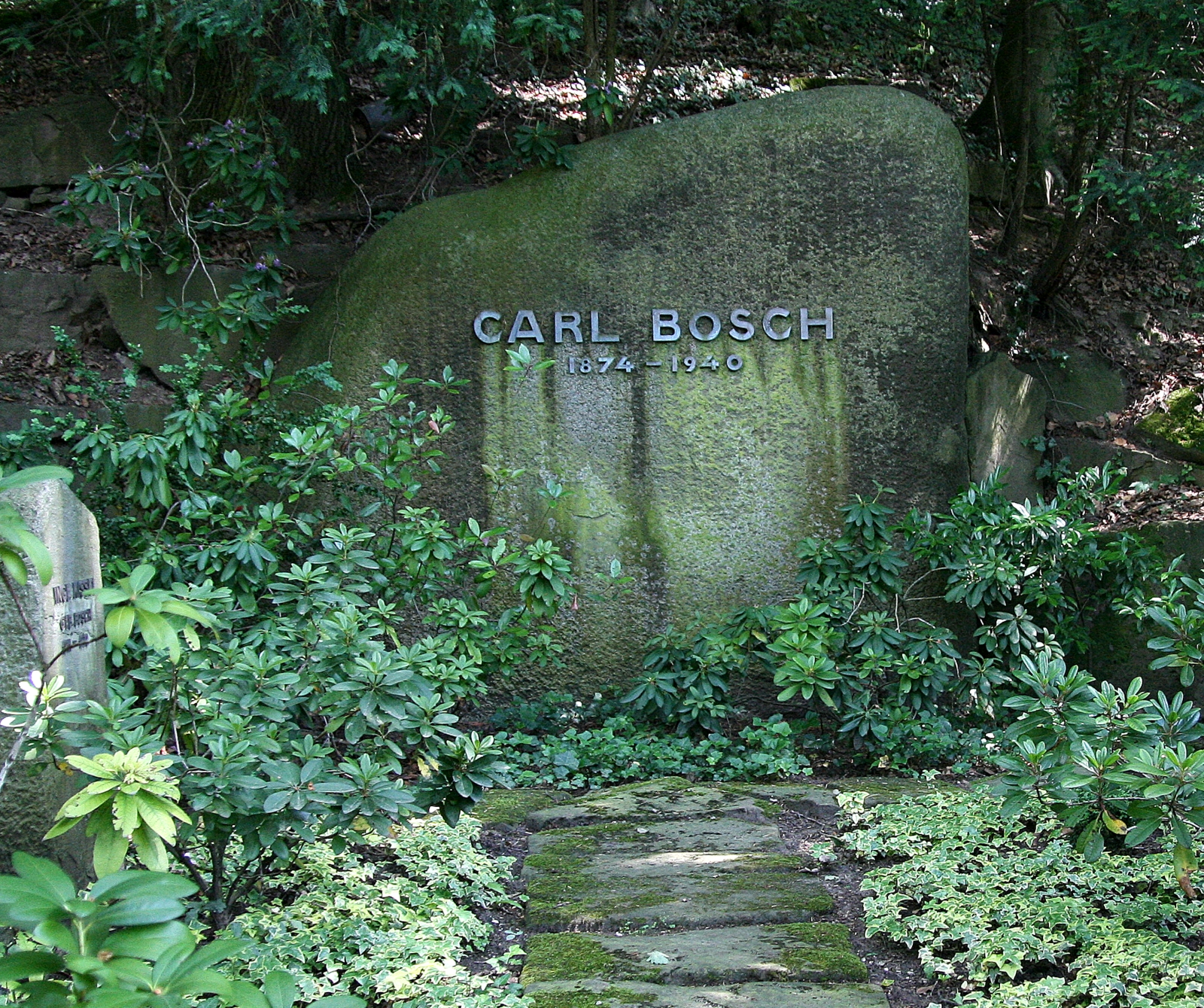
Bosch's grave in Heidelberg 49.396155°N 8.692567°E

Bosch married Else Schilbach in 1902. Carl and Else had a son and a daughter together. A critic of many Nazi policies, including anti-Semitism, Bosch was gradually relieved of his high positions, and fell into depression and alcoholism. He died in Heidelberg.

== Legacy ==
The Haber–Bosch Process today consumes more than one percent of humanity's energy production and is responsible for feeding roughly one-third of its population. On average, one-half of the nitrogen in a human body comes from synthetically fixed sources, the product of a Haber–Bosch plant. Bosch was an ardent collector of insects, minerals, and gems. His collected meteorites and other mineral samples were loaned to Yale University, and eventually purchased by the Smithsonian. He was an amateur astronomer with a well-equipped private observatory. The asteroid 7414 Bosch was named in his honour.

Carl Bosch along with Fritz Haber were voted the world's most influential chemical engineers of all time by members of the Institution of Chemical Engineers.

The Haber–Bosch process, which captures nitrogen from the air and converts it to ammonia, heavily impacted the Green Revolution that has been feeding the increasing population of the world.

Bosch also won numerous awards including an honorary doctorate from Technische Hochschule Karlsruhe (1918), the Liebig Memorial Medal of the Association of German Chemists along with the Bunsen Medal of the German Bunsen Society, the Siemens Ring, and the Golden Grashof Memorial medal of the VDI. In 1931 he was awarded the Nobel Prize for Chemistry for the contribution to the invention of chemical high pressure methods. He also received the Exner medal from the Austrian Trade Association and the Carl Lueg Memorial Medal. Bosch also enjoyed his membership of various German and foreign scientific academics, and his chairmanship of the Kaiser Wilhelm Society of which he became the President in 1937.

== Awards and honours ==
- 1931: Nobel Prize in Chemistry
- 1919: Liebig Medal of German Chemists Association
- 1924: Werner von Siemens Ring of Stiftung Werner-von-Siemens-Ring foundation
- 1932: Wilhelm Exner Medal of Austrian Trade Association
- Bunsen Medal of the German Bunsen Society
- Golden Grashof Memorial medal of the VDI
- Carl Lueg Memorial Medal

== See also ==
- German inventors and discoverers
- Fritz Haber
