= Wollheim Memorial =

Holocaust memorial site in Frankfurt am Main

Coordinates: 50°07′30″N 8°39′54″E

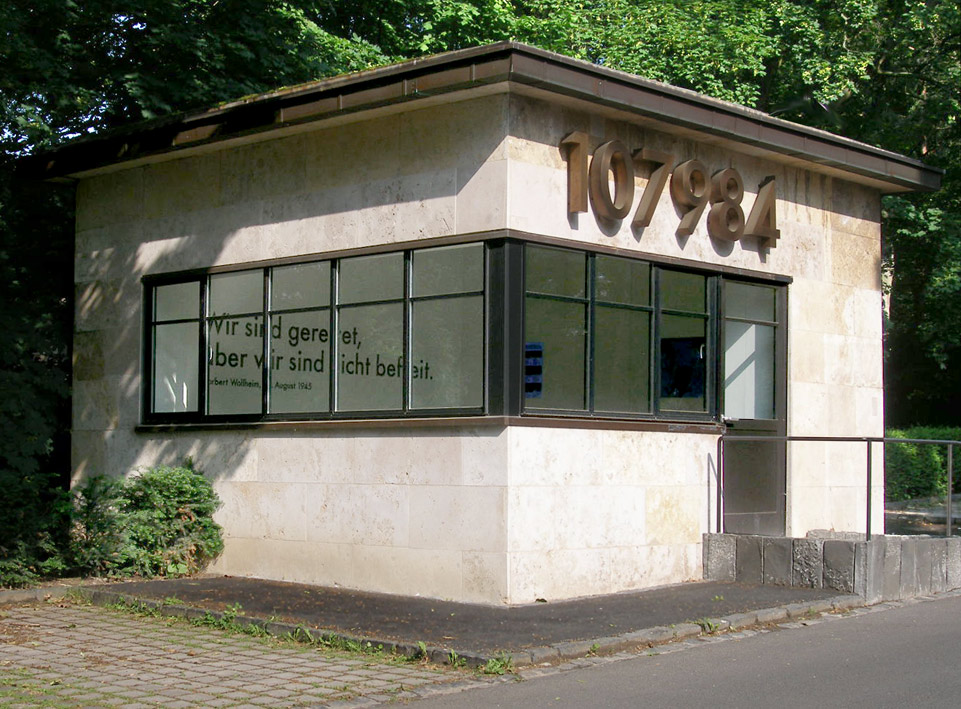
Wollheim Memorial

The Wollheim Memorial is a Holocaust memorial site in Frankfurt am Main.

It is named after Norbert Wollheim (1913–1998), a former member of the board of directors of the Central Council of Jews in Germany and forced labourer of IG Farben. Its purpose is to keep alive the memory of the victims at Buna/Monowitz and inform about their history and reparation.

Heiner Blum designed the Wollheim-Memorial and opened it on 2 November 2008. It consists of a small pavilion at Grüneburgplatz, which is now named Norbert-Wollheim-Platz, and 13 plates showing portraits of former prisoners in Buna-Monowitz. These photographs show young people who would later become imprisoned in the concentration camp Buna/Monowitz, they illustrate Jewish everyday life before Holocaust and testify devastated lifeworlds on the former grounds of IG Farben, which is today home to the humanistic and cultural studies faculty of the Goethe University Frankfurt (Campus Westend).

Above the entrance of the pavilion the prisoner number of Norbert Wollheim is installed. Inside the Wollheim quote "Wir sind gerettet, aber wir sind nicht befreit" ("We are saved but not liberated") of 26 August 1945 is placed on a wall inscription. Visitors are informed via two interactive screens by pictures, texts and documents about NS forced labour, the IG Farben lawsuits, the Auschwitz-Birkenau concentration camp and about the reparation (among other the Bundesentschädigungsgesetz and the Foundation Remembrance, Responsibility and Future).

In 24 video interviews survivors inform about their childhood, deportation, imprisonment and about their lives after the Holocaust. Norbert Wollheim also got a chance to speak in an interview which was recorded in Washington D.C. in 1991.
