= Heinrich Hörlein =

German chemist (1882–1954)

Philipp Heinrich Hörlein
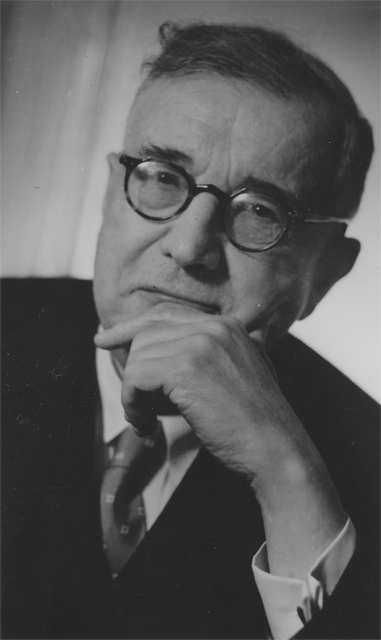
- Hörlein in 1953
- Born: 5 June 1882; Wendelsheim, Rhenish Hesse, Germany
- Died: 23 May 1954 (aged 71); Wuppertal, Germany
- Education: Alzey; University of Darmstadt
- Known for: Discovered the soporific Luminal in 1912
- Awards: state medal For Services to Public Health (ür Verdienste um die Volksgesundheit) (1932)
- Scientific career
- Fields: Chemistry
- Workplaces: Bayer, IG Farben
- Doctoral advisor: Ludwig Knorr

Philipp Heinrich Hörlein (5 June 1882 – 23 May 1954), was a German entrepreneur, scientist, lecturer, and Nazi Wehrwirtschaftsführer. He was tried for war crimes for his involvement in the Holocaust and his knowledge of medical experimentation on concentration camp prisoners, but he was ultimately acquitted and released.

== Bayer ==
Hörlein was the son of Heinrich Hörlein, a farmer, and his wife, Philippina (née Dürk). He studied chemistry at Technische Universität Darmstadt in 1900, moving on to the University of Jena in 1902 and graduating with his doctorate the following year. Having completed his studies under Ludwig Knorr, he worked as his assistant until 1909 when he took a position with the Bayer research laboratory in Elberfeld.

Hörlein succeeded Arthur Eichengrün as the head of the pharmaceutical research laboratories at Bayer in 1911. In this role he developed the soporific Luminal in 1912, an important drug in the treatment of epilepsy. In 1914 Hörlein became an authorised signatory at the company, adding a deputy directorship in 1919 before in 1921 becoming an alternate member of the managing board of the company.

== IG Farben and Nazi Party activity ==
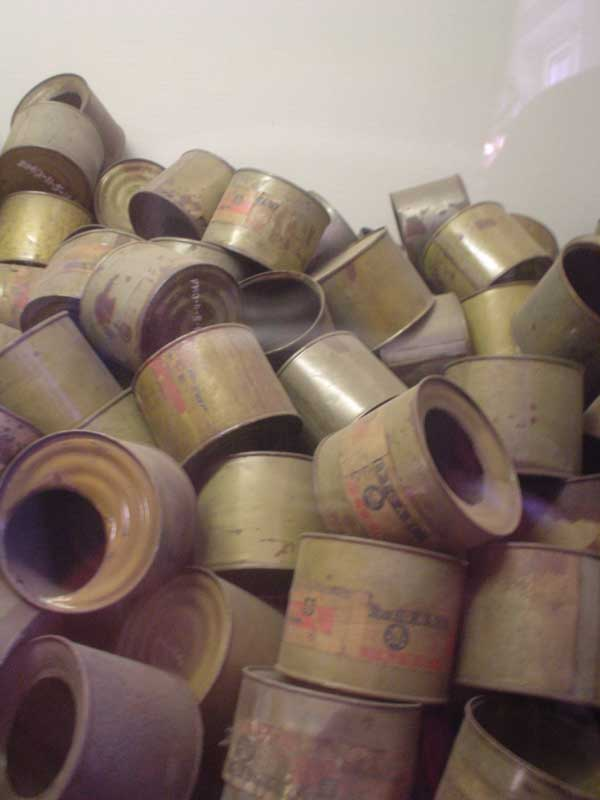
Empty Zyklon B canisters found by the Allies at Auschwitz the end of World War II

In 1925 the conglomerate IG Farben was established, bringing together Bayer and several other chemical companies. Hörlein was also an alternate member of the new company's managing board and in 1926 was made the head of their pharmaceutical research department.

He joined the Nazi Party in June 1934, one of a number of leading figures at IG Farben to do so once Hitler came to power. The previous year he had almost fallen foul of the Nazis when he campaigned against Hermann Göring's law banning testing on animals, something Hörlein considered essential to his research. He was eventually able to secure a partial lifting of the ban.

Although he was not responsible for developing the powerful nerve agent tabun (it had been developed by Gerhard Schrader), Hörlein was the one who recognised its potential value as a weapon of war and passed on information about the discovery to the Wehrmacht. Hörlein sat on the vorstand of the Deutsche Gesellschaft für Schädlingsbekämpfung, an IG Farben subsidiary company largely concerned with the production of Zyklon B. He was regularly privy to the sales figures for the gas and was fully aware of the company's close relationship to the extermination camps. He regularly received detailed reports of the human experimentation carried out by Helmuth Vetter, who purchased most of his subjects from the concentration camps.

Towards the end of the war Hörlein, sensing that a German defeat was imminent, moved his operations to Leverkusen and began to maintain a much lower profile.

== Post-war ==
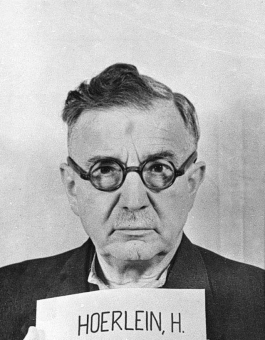
Heinrich Hörlein as defendant in the IG Farben trial

As a member of the managing board of the company he was one of those to face charges at the IG Farben trial. Ultimately he was acquitted and released. He returned to Leverkusen, where he took up a place on the board at Bayer. His wife Marie Hörlein donated 5,000 Euro for and designed the Hörlein Prize, which is for large scientific papers in the field of human medicine. In 1952, he received an honorary doctorate from Technische Universität Darmstadt. In 1955, the city of Leverkusen named a street after him.
