= Ernst von Simson =

German politician and judge (1876–1941)

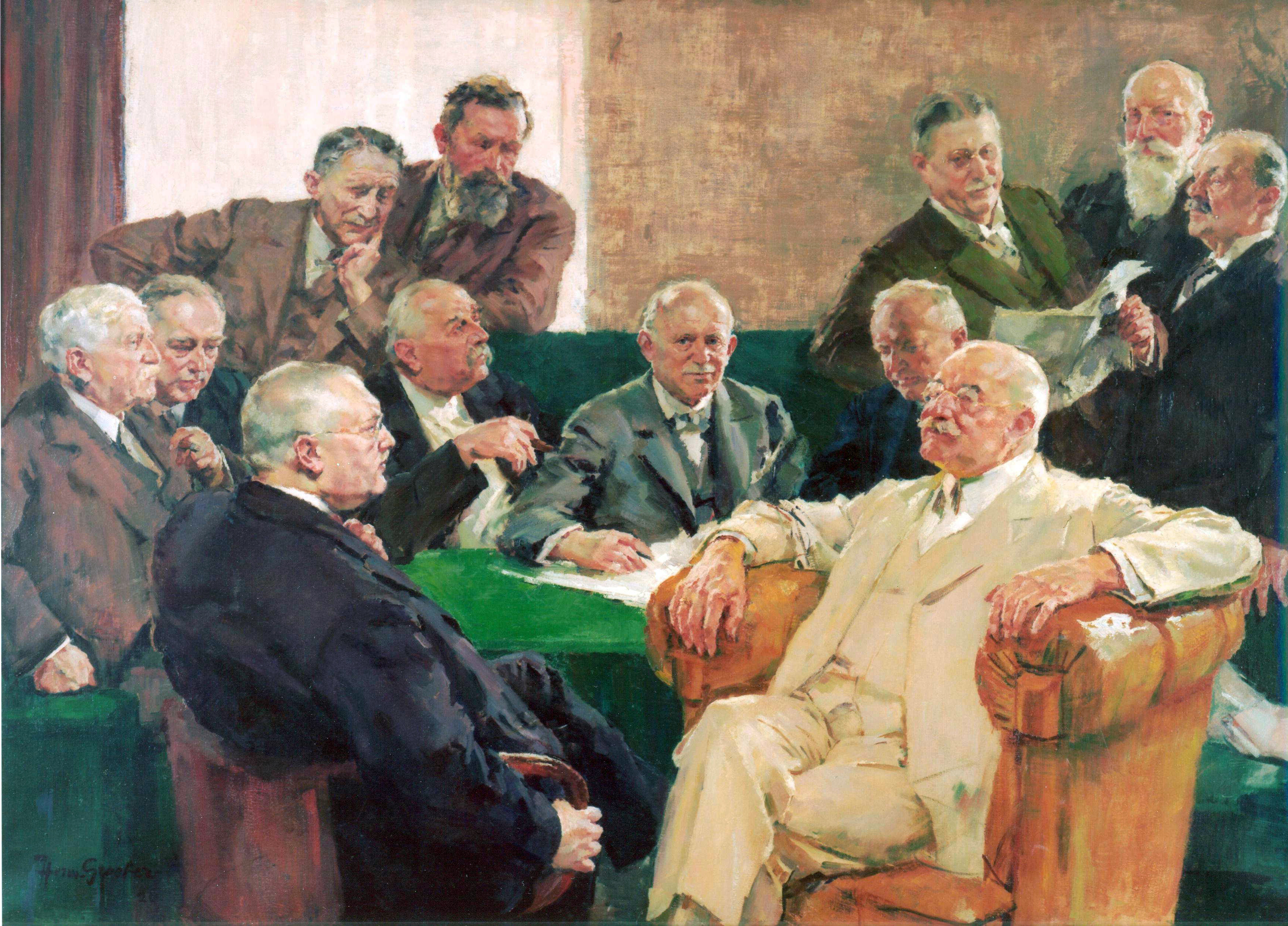
Ernst von Simson (second from left) on the IG Farben supervisory board, 1926.

Ernst von Simson (born 7 April 1876 in Berlin; died 7 November 1941 in Oxford) was a German lawyer, diplomat and entrepreneur.

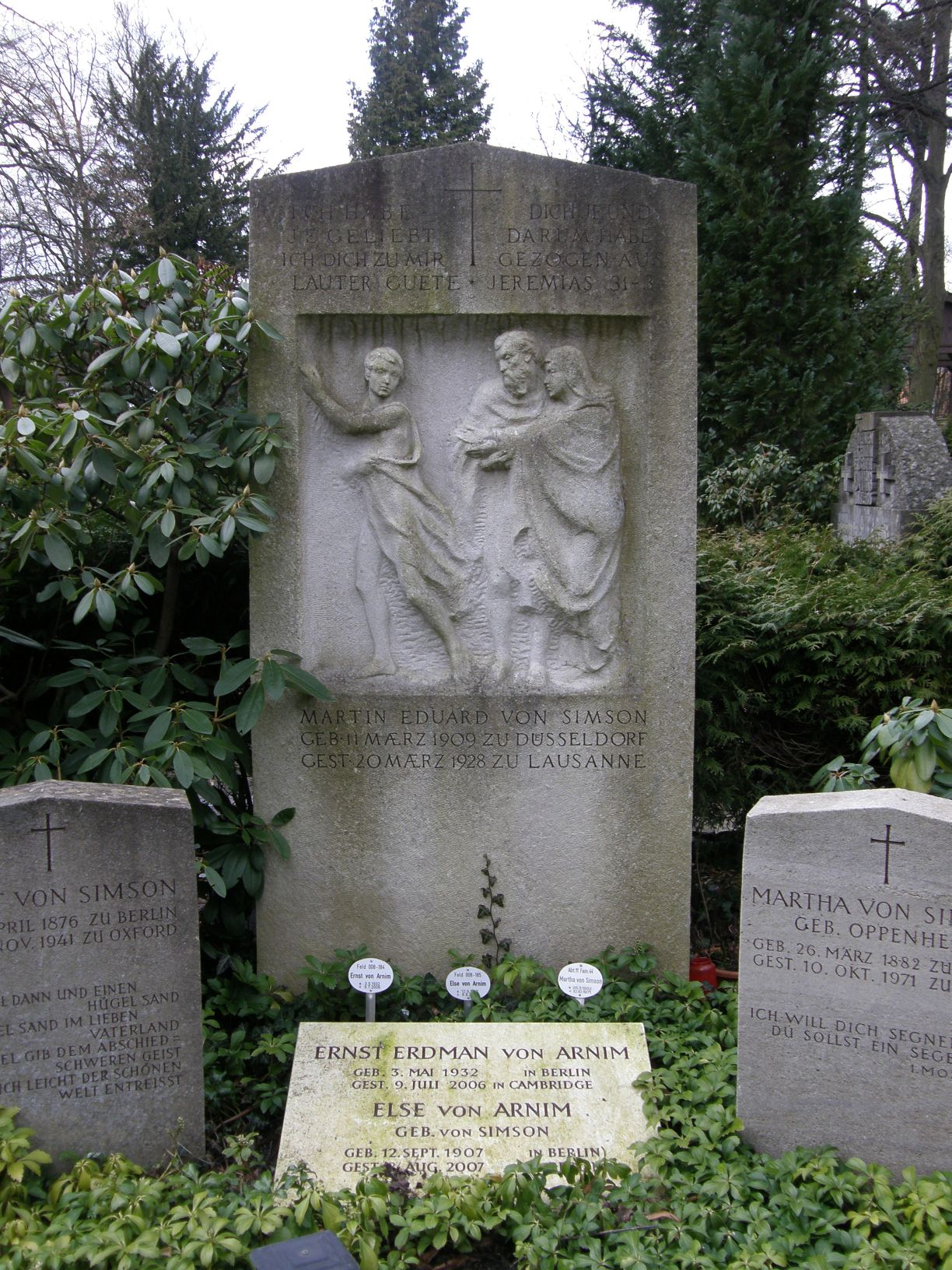
Memorial stone for Ernst von Simson in the Dahlem cemetery in Berlin

== Family ==
Ernst von Simson was a son of the lawyer August von Simson (1837-1927) and Beate, geb. Jonas, as well as a grandson of Eduard von Simsons. In 1901 he married Martha Oppenheim (1882–1971), a daughter of Franz Oppenheim and great-granddaughter of Martin Wilhelm Oppenheim. The couple had six children, including Dorothea von Simson (1910-1998), who married the lawyer Erckhinger von Schwerin, the art historian Otto von Simson (1912-1993) and the painter Vita Petersen (1915-2011).

== Literature ==
- Georg Simson, Singuna von Simson (ed.): Ernst von Simson (1876-1941). Memories, Berlin: Jonas'sche Family Foundation 2009.
- Dieter Neitzert: The office between Versailles and Rapallo. Review of State Secretary Ernst von Simson. In: Vierteljahrshefte für Zeitgeschichte 60, 2012, pp. 443–490.
- Norbert Gross: Ernst von Simson: in the service of Germany: from Versailles to Rapallo (1918–1922), Karlsruhe: Verlag der Gesellschaft für Kulturhistorischedokumentation 2013 (series of publications by the Legal History Museum Karlsruhe; 28) ISBN 978-3-922596-93-6.
