= High-pressure chemistry =

Field focused on chemical processes carried out under high pressure

High-pressure chemistry is concerned with those chemical processes that are carried out under high pressure – pressures in the thousands of bars (one bar equals 100 kPa) or higher. High-pressure processes are generally faster and have a higher conversion efficiency than processes at ambient pressure. However, they are usually only beneficial on an industrial scale because of the investment in plant required.

The Haber–Bosch process produces ammonia from hydrogen and atmospheric nitrogen. It was first demonstrated in 1909 and became an important industrial process for Germany during World War One when it played a part in the manufacture of explosives. Today, it is mostly used to produce fertilizer.

The Bergius process produces hydrocarbon fuel from bituminous coal and hydrogen. The process was first published in 1913 and was an important source of fuel for Germany during World War Two. The process was used in the US for a while after the war, but there are currently no commercial plants in the world.

The Bergius process and the Haber-Bosch process were two pioneering methods of high-pressure chemistry. The invention and development of these two processes led to the award of the Nobel Prize in Chemistry for 1931 jointly to Friedrich Bergius and Carl Bosch.

== See also ==
- Jiri Jonas
- Otto Ruff
- Hanns Hörbiger
- Vladimir Ipatieff
- Nylon
- Haber process
