= Helmuth Vetter =

German Nazi SS officer (1910–1949)

Helmuth Vetter (21 March 1910 in Rastenberg – 2 February 1949) was an SS-Hauptsturmführer and a Nazi war criminal.

Vetter was a doctor at the Auschwitz extermination camp, appointed chief doctor by Reichsführer-SS Heinrich Himmler. He joined other doctors (such as Hans König, Heinz Thilo, and Fritz Klein) in the task of choosing employable Jews to operate the industrial machines and sending others to the gas chambers. He also carried medical experiments on prisoners, involving phenol injections As paid retainer of IG Farben, Vetter would also deliberately infect prisoners in Auschwitz, Dachau and Gusen to carry out medical experiments. After the war, Vetter was found guilty of war crimes and sentenced to death. He was hanged in the prison of Landsberg am Lech.
