= Vita Petersen =

German American artist (1915–2011)

- Born: Vita von Simson; 1915; Berlin, Germany
- Died: October 22, 2011 (aged 95–96); New York, New York
- Known for: Painter
- Movement: Abstract expressionism
- Spouse: Gustav Petersen

Vita Petersen (1915–2011) was an Abstract expressionist painter. She is known for her association with the New York Studio School.

Petersen née von Simson was born in Berlin, Germany in 1915. She had an older brother named Otto von Simson. She studied at the Berlin Academy and the Munich School of Fine Arts.

She fled Germany and immigrated to the United States in 1938.

Petersen settled in New York. She married fellow immigrant Gustav Peterson, with whom she had one child named Andrea Petersen. She studied with Hans Hofmann. Petersen was friends with Mercedes Matter, founder of the New York Studio School. Petersen was both a teacher and a trustee of the school. In the 1960s she was the subject of a series of portraits by Walker Evans. Eventually, Petersen had to transition to painting strictly in black and white due to her deteriorating eyesight.

She exhibited around New York City, including the Betty Parsons Gallery. In 2012 she held her last show Vita Petersen – In Black and White: Her Last Works at the New York Studio School.

Petersen died in New York City on October 22, 2011 at the age of 96.
