= Edmund ter Meer =

German chemist (1852–1931)

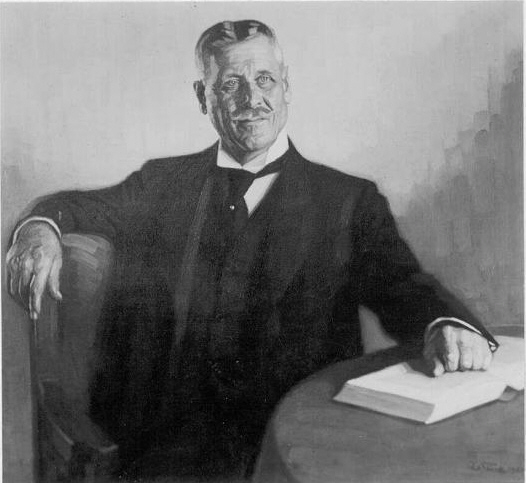
- Portrait by Paul Türoff, circa 1922
- Born: 31 July 1852; Krefeld
- Died: 5 November 1931 (aged 79); Krefeld-Uerdingen
- Known for: ter Meer reaction
- Scientific career
- Workplaces: Bayer

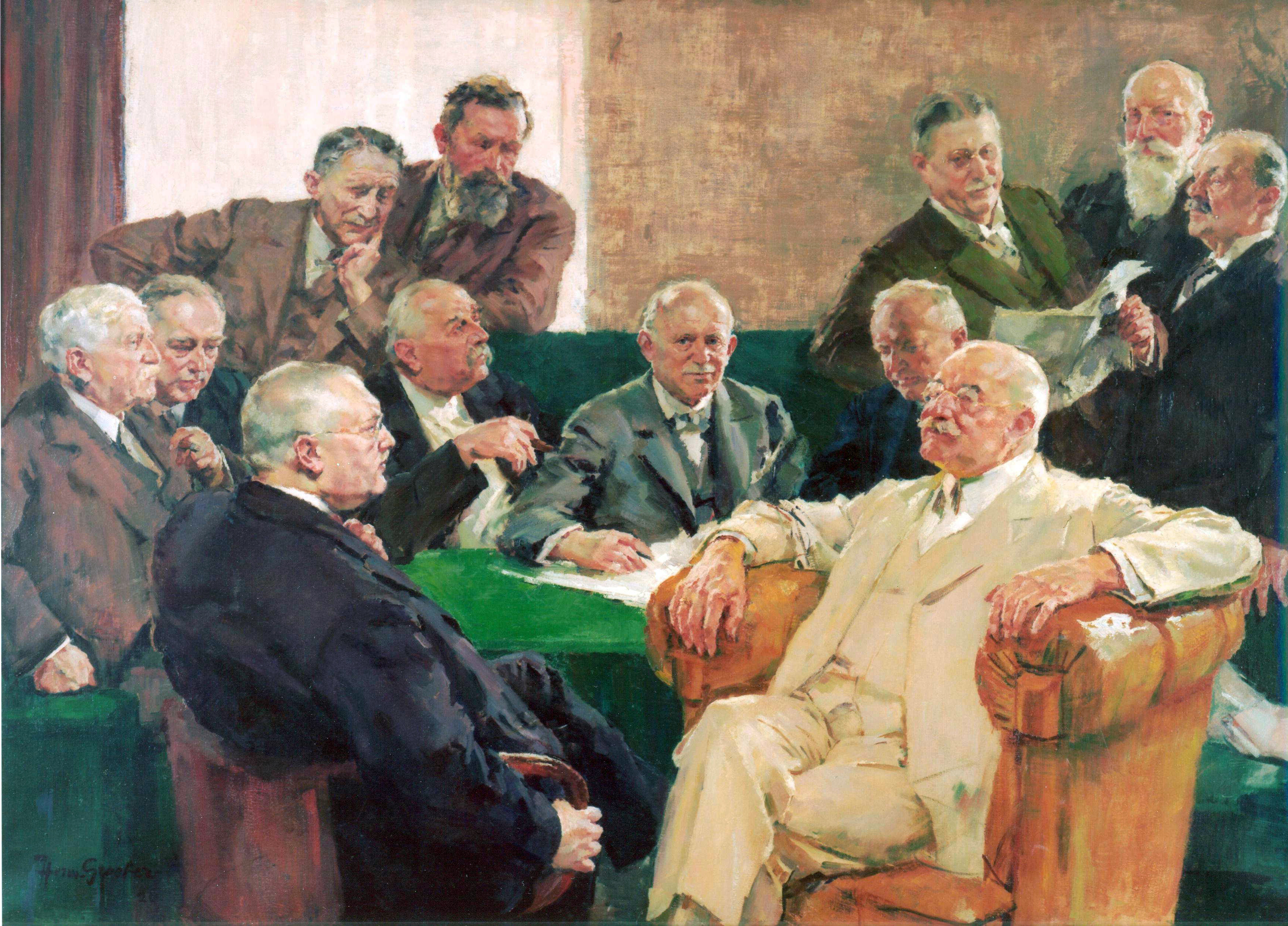
Painting by Hermann Groeber: Der Aufsichtsrat der 1925 gegründeten I.G. Farben AG, Carl Bosch and Carl Duisberg (in front, sitting), Edmund ter Meer (third person from right with newspaper)

Edmund ter Meer (31 July 1852 – 5 November 1931) was a German chemist who discovered the ter Meer reaction and founded in 1877 the ter Meer dye company in Uerdingen. After merging Julius Weiler's aniline factory, the Weiler-ter Meer company was formed. The company later became part of Bayer. His son Fritz ter Meer also became a chemist associated with Bayer.
