= Norbert Wollheim =

German chartered accountant and tax advisor

- Born: April 26, 1913; Berlin, Kingdom of Prussia, German Empire
- Died: November 1, 1998 (aged 85); New York, USA
- Occupation: Accountant
- Known for: Winning compensation from I.G. Farben

Norbert Wollheim (April 26, 1913 – November 1, 1998) was a chartered accountant, tax advisor, previously a board member of the Central Council of Jews in Germany and a functionary of other Jewish organisations.

Wollheim grew up in Berlin. He studied jurisprudence and political economy, but had to cease his studies in 1933 because of his Jewish origin. He then worked as a welder for a metal export firm until the outbreak of war in 1939. During that same period he played a key role in running the Kindertransport which transported 10,000 Jewish children out of the Nazi government's reach and into safety.

Wollheim engaged himself strongly in the Jewish life and became a managing director of the federation of German-Jewish Werkleute youth. After the night of the November Pogroms known as Kristallnacht in 1938, he helped to organise the transports of Jewish children to Great Britain and Sweden. In 1939, he also personally accompanied Kindertransports to Sweden, but immediately returned to Berlin after leaving the children in safety. Until 1941 he was responsible for the vocational training schools of the Reichsvereinigung der Juden in Deutschland and adviser on the training relating to crafts of Jewish Germans.

From September 1941 Wollheim worked at a transportation equipment factory in Lichtenberg, Berlin.

== Auschwitz ==
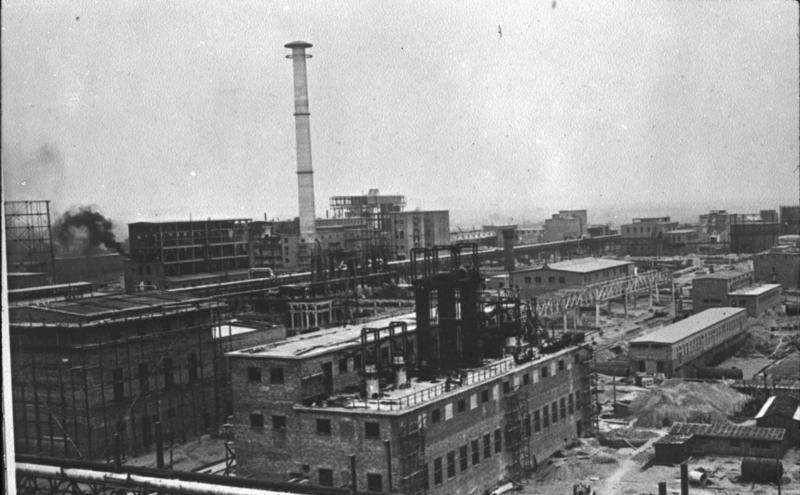
IG Farben factory in Monowitz (near Auschwitz), 1941 50.036094°N 19.275534°E

On March 8, 1943, Wollheim with his sister Ruth Wollheim (born in 1910), his wife Rosa (née Mandelbrod, born in 1912) and their son Peter Uriel (born in 1939) were arrested by the Gestapo and brought to the gathering point for Jews in the Große Hamburger Straße in Berlin, Germany. On March 12, 1943, the whole family was deported to Auschwitz. While Wollheim was singled out for slave labour, his sister, wife and child were gassed in the concentration camp.

Wollheim was brought to Auschwitz camp III, Monowitz, where he had to work as a slave labourer for I.G. Farbenindustrie AG, helping build the new Buna-factory IV until the evacuation of Auschwitz on January 18, 1945. On one of the so-called death marches of camp inmates being evacuated by the SS, Wollheim managed to flee.

== After the war ==
He settled in Lübeck, British Zone of Occupation. He soon engaged in the Lübeck Jewish community, elected its president, and helped to rebuild Jewish life in West Germany. He was elected second chairman of the Central Committee of Liberated Jews in the British Zone ("Zentralkomitee der befreiten Juden in der britischen Zone") and was cofounder of the Jewish Trust Corporation in the British zone. Later he became chairman of the Association of Northwestern Germany's Jewish Congregations (German: Verband der Jüdischen Gemeinden Nordwestdeutschlands) and member of the board of the Central Council of Jews in Germany.

== I.G. Farben claim ==
In 1950 Norbert Wollheim sued I.G. Farbenindustrie AG in liquidation for his salary as a forced labourer and compensation for damages. His lawsuit was the first test case of a former forced labourer against a company in Germany. In 1953, Frankfurt's Landgericht convicted IG Farben i.L. and ordered them to pay, at the first hearing, DM 10,000 in punitive damages to Wollheim. At the second hearing, Frankfurt's Oberlandesgericht settled the lawsuit with a global settlement awarding several thousand of the former slave labourers of I.G. Farben DM 30 million. The settlement apart from the parties of the lawsuit involved the Conference on Jewish Material Claims against Germany. The settlement was accompanied by a law (German: Aufrufgesetz) in 1957 passed by the West German Bundestag.

Wollheim emigrated to the U.S. in September 1951 and settled in New York City, where he studied to become an accountant. He exercised his profession until the mid-1980s. Wollheim provided his services on a pro bono basis to organisations like the US Holocaust Council and the World Federation of Bergen-Belsen Survivors.
