= Fritz ter Meer =

German chemist, businessman and war criminal (1884–1967)

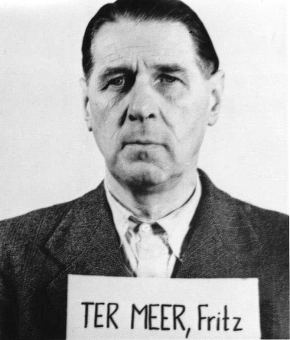
- Mugshot of ter Meer at the Nuremberg trials
- Born: Friedrich Hermann ter Meer; 4 July 1884; Uerdingen, Rhine Province, Prussia, Germany
- Died: 27 October 1967 (aged 83); Leverkusen, West Germany
- Awards: War Merit Cross
- Scientific career
- Fields: Chemistry
- Workplaces: IG Farben, Bayer
- Criminal information
- Status: Released 1950
- Conviction: War crimes
- Penalty: Seven years' imprisonment (1948)

Details
- Targets: Slave labourers; Jews and others
- Imprisoned at: Kransberg Castle; Landsberg Prison

Friedrich Hermann ter Meer (4 July 1884 – 27 October 1967) was a German chemist, businessman and convicted war criminal.

From 1925 to 1945 ter Meer was on the board of IG Farben AG. He was involved in the planning of Monowitz concentration camp, a satellite camp of Auschwitz concentration camp. Fritz ter Meer was sentenced to seven years in prison in the Nuremberg trials in 1948 for "mass murder and enslavement". After his release in 1951 he was selected as chairman of the board of directors for Bayer AG.

== Early life ==
Fritz ter Meer was the son of Edmund ter Meer (1852–1931), who founded the chemical company Teerfarbenfabrik Dr. E. ter Meer & Cie in Uerdingen, which in 1925 became part of IG Farben. His family tree can be traced back to the 15th Century.

After completing his schooling in 1903, ter Meer studied chemistry and law in France and Germany until 1908. His thesis on the ether Isonitrosoketonen won him a doctorate in Berlin in 1909. He went on to study dye chemistry in Krefeld, France and England.

== Career ==
Thereafter, he worked in the family-owned company Dr. E. ter Meer & Co., where he held senior positions and in 1919 became a member of the Board. After the merger he worked for IG Farben until 1945. Meer was responsible for running negotiations between IG Farben and Standard Oil.

From 1925 to 1945 Fritz ter Meer was on the board of IG Farben AG. He was also from 1932 a member of the Working Committee and the Technical Committee, Head of Division II in the War Ministry and the defense industry.

=== Nazi support during World War II ===
In May 1937, he joined the Nazi Party. On 7 September 1939 he and Henry agreed with the Army Ordnance Hörlein the production of the gas Tabun, an extremely toxic nerve agent. More than 100 prisoners of war were used during construction of the designated poison gas factory in Dyhernfurth.

He was involved in the planning of Monowitz concentration camp, a satellite camp of Auschwitz concentration camp, and was responsible for helping build the IG Farben Buna Werke factory at Auschwitz, which conducted human experiments and held some 25,000 slave labourers under deplorable conditions.

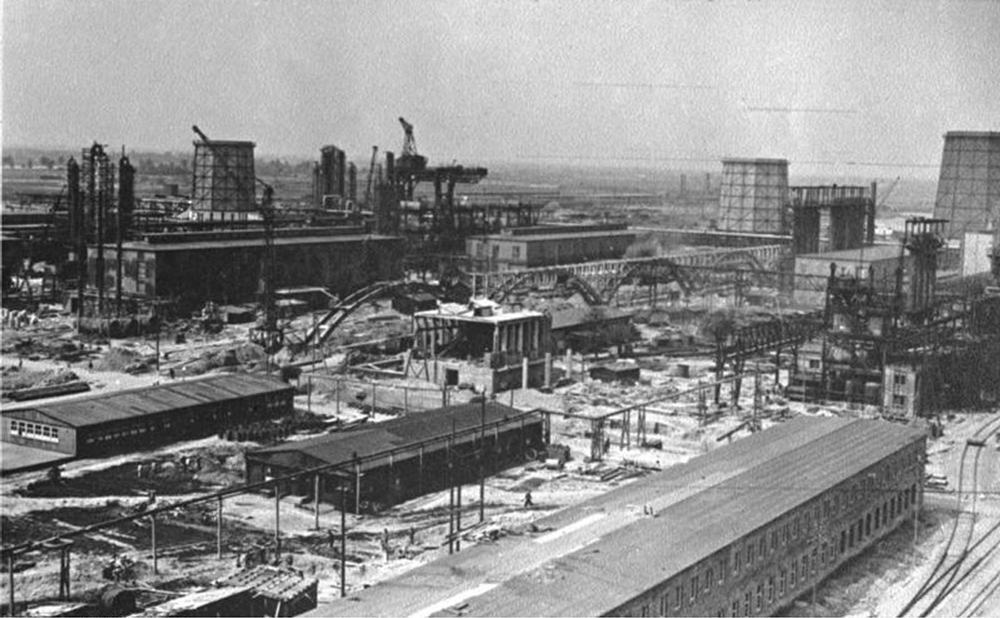
IG Farben plant at Monowitz under construction approximately 10 kilometres (6.2 mi) from Auschwitz, 1942

In September 1943 he became General Agent for Italy, the Reich Minister for armaments and war production. The same year, he received the Knight's Cross of War Merit Cross.

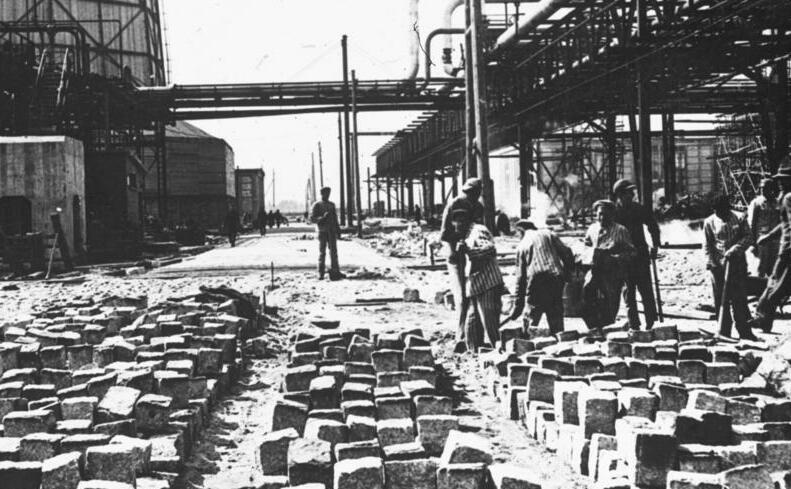
Prisoners at work in Monowitz, identified by striped clothes

=== War crimes trial ===
Fritz Ter Meer was incarcerated at Kransberg Castle in July 1945, under Operation Dustbin.

In 1945 the US began investigating the IG Farben for potential war crime violations, and US attorneys began questioning Farben executives. In 1946 Meer began writing company memos that tried to hide IG Farben's service to the Nazi Party and Hitler. On May 3, 1947, Meer along with 23 other board members and executives of IG Farben were charged with five counts of war crimes by US attorneys at the Nuremberg Military Tribunals:

1. Planning, preparation, initiation, and waging of wars of aggression and invasions of other countries
2. Plunder and spoliation
3. Slavery and mass murder
4. Membership in the SS
5. Common plan or conspiracy

On 27 August 1947, the IG Farben Trial began. The trial lasted 152 days, ending on 28 May 1948. On 29 July 1948 the verdict was announced. On counts 1 and 5, specifically relating to the waging of wars, the defendants were found not guilty; while the court found the defendants had worked to assist the Nazi Party there was no evidence the executives were directly advising Hitler. However, on the rest of the counts (mass murder/enslavement, plunder, SS membership), Meer — along with other executives — was found guilty as charged. He was sentenced to seven years imprisonment. The court, in part of its findings regarding Meer wrote:

"The inference is strong that Farben officials subordinate to Ter Meer took the initiative in securing the services of these inmates at the plant site. This inference is further supported by the fact that Farben at its own expense and with funds appropriated by the TEA [Technical Committee], of which Ter Meer was chairman, built Camp Monowitz for the specific purpose of housing its concentration-camp workers. We are convinced beyond a reasonable doubt that the officials in charge of Farben construction went beyond the necessity created by the pressure of government officials and may be justly charged with taking the initiative in planning for and availing themselves of the use of concentration-camp labor. Of these officials Ter Meer had greatest authority."

=== Bayer chairmanship and later life ===
He was released early in the summer of 1950 because of "good behaviour" from Landsberg Prison. In 1956 Meer became chairman of the board for IG Farben spinoff, Bayer AG. He held the position of supervisory board chairman until 1964. In subsequent years, he also took on board positions at a number of other companies, including, among others, Theodor Goldschmidt, Commerzbank, Association of German Banks, Duewag, VIAG and Union Bank AG, West Germany.

He retired in 1961.

In his memory, his employer set up the Fritz-ter-Meer-Stiftung, now called the Bayer Science & Education Foundation, which promotes chemistry students through scholarships.

== Additional sources ==
- Heine, Jens Ulrich (1990). Verstand und Schicksal. Die Männer der I.G. Farbenindustrie A.G. (1925-1945). Weinheim; New York: VCH. ISBN 978-3-527-28144-2.
- Deutschland Radio Berlin 30/6/98
