= Hermann Groeber =

German painter (1865–1935)

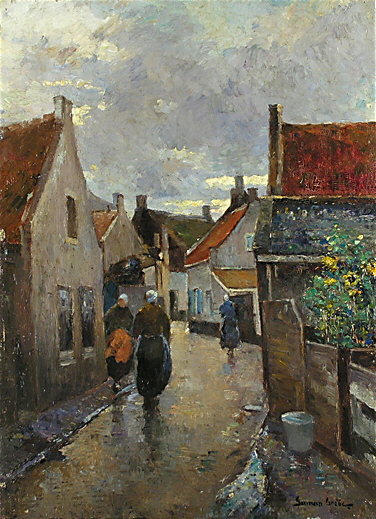
Village street oil painting by Hermann Groeber

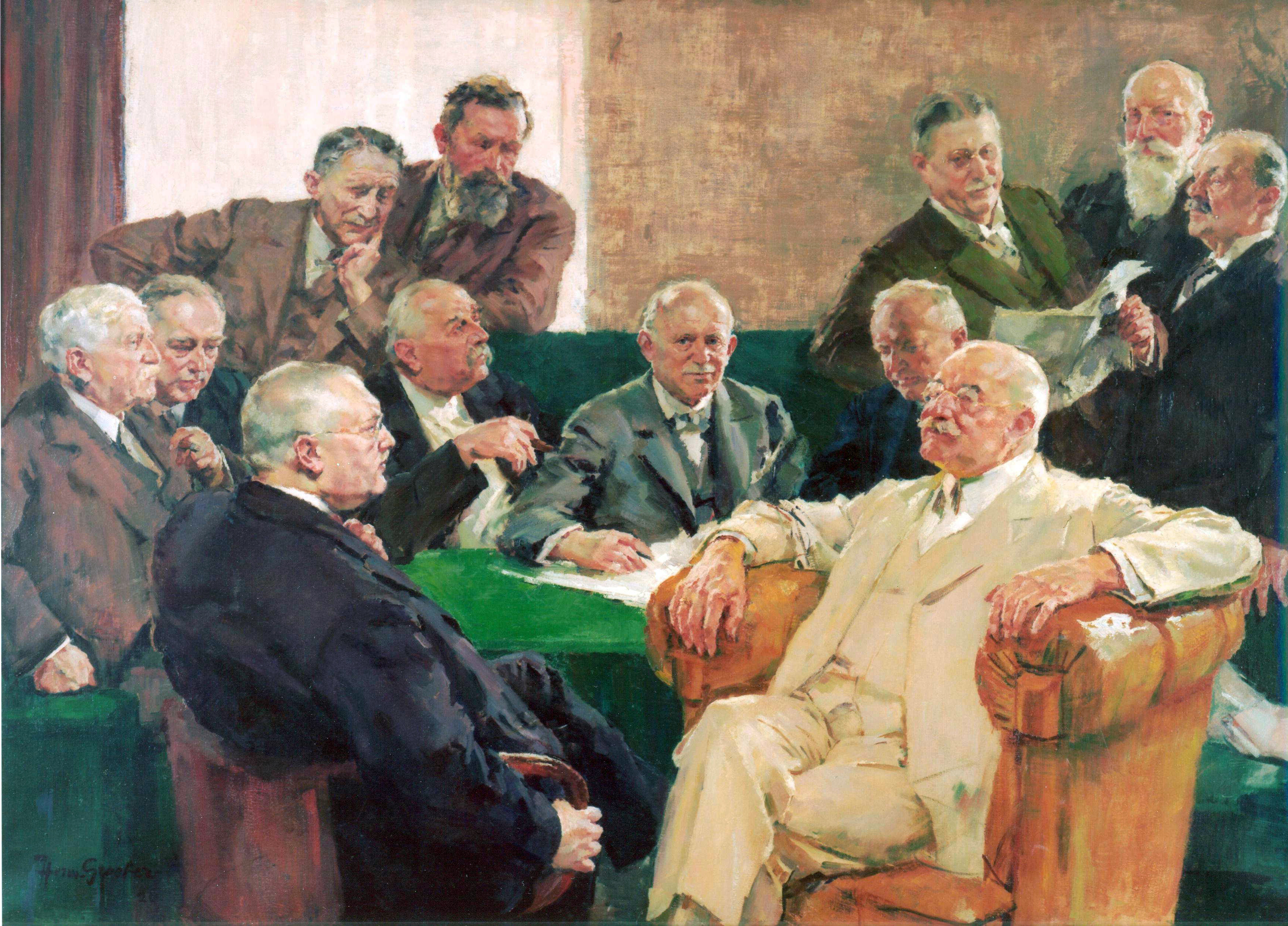
The Supervisory Board ( Council of the Gods ) of IG Farben AG (1926), current location: Bayer archive in Leverkusen

Hermann Groeber (born 17 July 1865 in Wartenberg. Kingdom of Bavaria; died 24 June 1935 in Gstadt am Chiemsee) was a German painter who was known throughout Germany as a portraitist and landscape artist.

== Biography ==
Hermann Groeber gained early success as a self-employed painter. He joined the German Association of Artists, and after Ludwig Schmid-Reutte was appointed to Karlsruhe, Groeber took over his life drawing class, which soon enjoyed great popularity. In 1907 he became head of the nude class at the Munich Academy and was appointed full professor there in 1911.

In 1911 he received the Gold Medal at the exhibition in the Munich Glass Palace.

== Students ==
- Thomas Baumgartner
- Walter Bud
- Marius Bunescu
- Arnold Fiechter
- Hermann Finsterlin
- Erwin Henning
- Leo Sebastian Humer
- Paul Kauzmann
- Paul Klee
- Hans Lembke
- Oswald Malura
