= Charles Coward =

British POW who saved over 400 Jews from Auschwitz

Charles Joseph Coward
- Coward on the set of The Password Is Courage with Dirk Bogarde, who played him in the film
- Born: January 30, 1905; Sudbury, Suffolk, England
- Died: December 21, 1976 (aged 71); Edmonton, London
- Military career
- Allegiance: United Kingdom
- Branch: British Army
- Service years: 1937 to 1945
- Rank: Warrant Officer Class II (Battery Sergeant Major)
- Nickname: Count of Auschwitz
- Conflicts: Second World War

Charles Joseph Coward (30 January 1905 – 21 December 1976), known as the "Count of Auschwitz", was a British soldier captured during the Second World War who rescued Jews from Auschwitz and claimed he had smuggled himself into the camp for one night, subsequently testifying about his experience at the IG Farben Trial at Nuremberg. He also smuggled at least several hundred Jewish prisoners out of concentration camps.

== Biography ==
Coward joined the Army in June 1924 and was captured in May 1940 near Calais while serving with the 8th Reserve Regimental Royal Artillery as BQMS, Battery Quartermaster Sergeant. He managed to make two escape attempts before even reaching a prisoner of war camp, then made seven further escapes; on one memorable occasion managing to be awarded the Iron Cross while posing as a wounded soldier in a German Army field hospital. When in captivity he was equally troublesome to his captors, arranging several acts of sabotage while out on work details.

Finally in December 1943 he was transferred to the Auschwitz III (Monowitz) labour camp (Arbeitslager), situated only five miles from the better-known extermination camp of Auschwitz II (Birkenau). Monowitz was under the direction of the industrial company IG Farben, who were building a Buna (synthetic rubber) and liquid fuel plant there. It housed over 10,000 Jewish slave labourers, as well as POWs and forced labourers from all over occupied Europe. Coward and other British POWs were housed in sub-camp E715, administered by Stalag VIII-B.

Thanks to his command of the German language, Coward was appointed Red Cross liaison officer ("Man of Confidence") for the 1,200–1,400 British prisoners. In this trusted role he was allowed to move fairly freely throughout the camp and often to surrounding towns. He witnessed the arrival of trainloads of Jews to the extermination camp. Coward and other British prisoners smuggled food and other items to the Jewish inmates. He also exchanged coded messages with the British authorities via letters to a fictitious Mr William Orange (Code for the War Office), giving military information, notes on the conditions of POWs and the other prisoners in the camps, as well as dates and numbers of the arrival of trainloads of Jews.

On one occasion a note was smuggled to him from a Jewish-British ship's doctor, who was being held in Monowitz. Coward determined to contact him directly. He managed to swap clothes with an inmate on a work detail and spent the night in the Jewish camp, seeing at first hand the horrific conditions in which these Jewish people were held. He failed to find the individual, later found to be Karel Sperber – see below. This experience formed the basis of his subsequent testimony in post-war legal proceedings.

Determined to do something about it, Coward used Red Cross supplies, particularly chocolate, to "buy" from the SS guards corpses of dead prisoners, including Belgian and French civilian forced labourers. He then gave the documents and clothes taken from the non-Jewish corpses to the Jewish escapees, who adopted these new identities and were then smuggled out of the camp altogether. Coward carried out this scheme on numerous occasions and is estimated to have saved at least 400 Jewish slave labourers.

In December 1944 Coward was sent back to the main camp of Stalag VIII-B at Lamsdorf (now Łambinowice, Poland) and in January 1945 the POWs were marched under guard to Bavaria, where they were eventually liberated.

=== Post-war ===
After the war Coward testified at the Nuremberg war crimes trials, describing the conditions inside the Monowitz camp, the treatment of Allied POWs and Jewish prisoners and the locations of the gas chambers. In 1953, Coward also appeared as a witness in the "Wollheim Suit", when former slave labourer Norbert Wollheim sued IG Farben for his salary and compensation for damages.

In January 1955, Coward joined the Old Comrades Lodge No. 4077 of UGLE.

He was the subject of This Is Your Life broadcast on 24 October 1960, when he was surprised by Eamonn Andrews at the BBC Television Theatre.

== Media ==
In 1954 John Castle's book, The Password is Courage, describing Coward's wartime activities, was published. It has been through ten editions since and remains in print. On the back cover of the current edition, he is billed as "The Man who Broke into Auschwitz" (which is also the title of Denis Avey's semi-fictional and semi-autobiographical book, "The Man who Broke into Auschwitz"). This was adapted into a 1962 film also titled The Password Is Courage starring Dirk Bogarde. The film was lighthearted compared to the book and made only passing reference to Coward's time at Auschwitz; it concentrated instead on his numerous escapes and added a fictitious romantic liaison.

== Awards ==
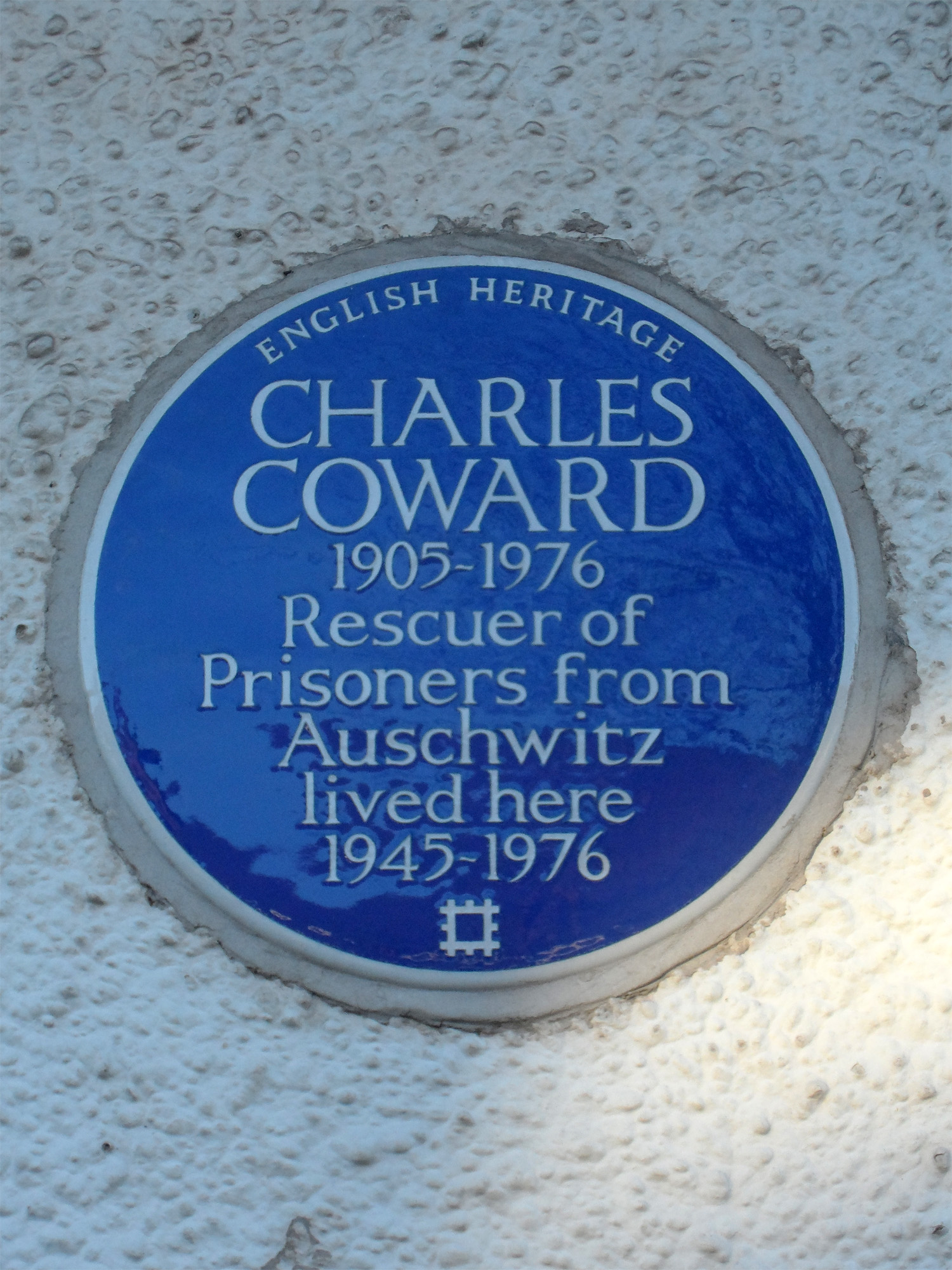
English Heritage blue plaque commemorating Coward at his home in 133 Chichester Road, London

In 1963, Coward was named one of the Righteous Among the Nations and had a tree planted in his honour in the Avenue of Righteous Gentiles in Yad Vashem. In 2003, Coward was further commemorated with the mounting of a blue plaque at his home at 133, Chichester Road, Edmonton, London, where he lived from 1945 until his death. The North Middlesex Hospital has a ward named "Charles Coward" in his honour.

In 2010, Coward was posthumously named a British Hero of the Holocaust by the British Government.

== Counterclaims ==
Since Coward's death his claims have been treated with some scepticism. One major difficulty is that there are no known surviving fellow escapees, and it is possible that all were recaptured and killed. When Coward himself was questioned by Yad Vashem researchers in 1962 he offered few details about their identities or fates saying "It is not known exactly how many of these people regained their freedom, because some people went different ways and to different countries." He added: "And naturally no records were kept of them because once they arrived in their new country, special papers were given to them and perhaps different names, etc." The revisionist position is that Coward may have saved a few Jews, but certainly not hundreds.

== See also ==
- Arthur Dodd (Auschwitz survivor)

== Sources ==
- "Affidavit and Testimony of Charles J. Coward" (PDF). Trials of War Criminals Before the Nuernberg Military Tribunals Under Control Council Law No. 10, October 1946 – April 1949. VIII: 603–616. July 1947.
- Castle, John (1954). The Password is Courage. London: Souvenir Press.
- White, J. R. (1 February 2001). ""Even in Auschwitz...Humanity Could Prevail": British POWs and Jewish Concentration-Camp Inmates at IG Auschwitz, 1943-1945". Holocaust and Genocide Studies. 15 (2): 266–295. doi:10.1093/hgs/15.2.266.
