= Arthur Dodd =

Arthur Dodd may refer to:

- A. H. Dodd (Arthur Herbert Dodd, 1891–1975), academic historian
- Arthur Dodd (British Army soldier) (1919–2011), British soldier during World War II and Auschwitz survivor
