= Schottel =

Schottel (company), German manufacturer of ship propulsion

Schottel or Schöttel is a German surname. Notable people with the surname include:

- Ivan Schottel, United States football coach
- Justus Georg Schottel, Baroque German grammarian
- Peter Schöttel, Austrian football player

== See also ==
- Vinzenz Schöttl (1905–1946), German Nazi leader in the KZ Monowitz
