= Monowitz concentration camp =

One of the three main camps in the Auschwitz concentration camp system

Monowitz Buna-Werke
- Concentration camp
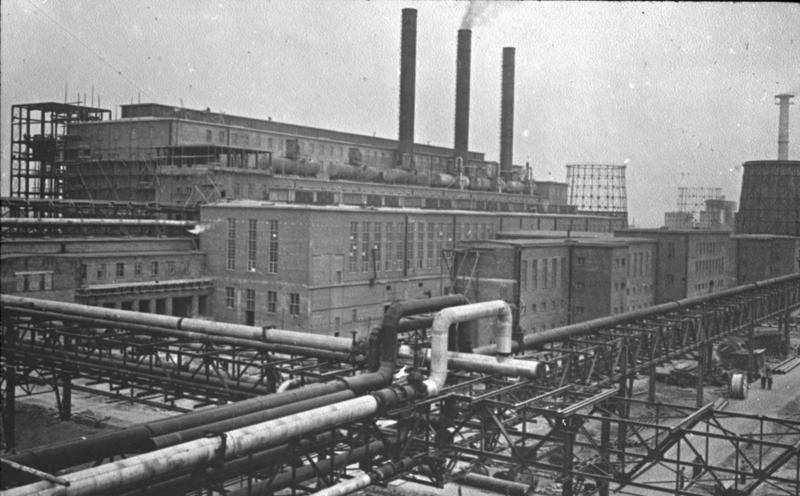
- IG Farben factory in Auschwitz III-Monowitz

- Monowitz in occupied Poland
- Coordinates: 50°02′07.8″N 19°16′40.8″E
- Other names: Monowitz (placename)
- Known for: Forced labor camp
- Location: Near Oświęcim, Polish areas annexed by Nazi Germany
- Built by: IG Farben
- Operated by: Schutzstaffel
- Commandant: Heinrich Schwarz
- Original use: Factories for producing synthetic rubber and chemicals including Zyklon B
- First built: October 1942
- Operational: October 1942 – January 1945
- Inmates: Mainly Jews
- Number of inmates: Around 12,000
- Killed: 2,500
- Liberated by: Red Army on 27 January 1945
- Notable inmates: Primo Levi, Victor Perez, Elie Wiesel, Fritz Löhner-Beda

Monowitz (also known as Monowitz-Buna, Buna and Auschwitz III) was a Nazi concentration camp and labor camp (Arbeitslager) run by Nazi Germany in occupied Poland from 1942 to 1945, during World War II and the Holocaust. For most of its existence, Monowitz was a subcamp of the Auschwitz concentration camp; from November 1943 it and other Nazi subcamps in the area were jointly known as "Auschwitz III-subcamps" (KL Auschwitz III-Aussenlager). In November 1944 the Germans renamed it Monowitz concentration camp, after the village of Monowice (German: Monowitz) where it was built, in the annexed portion of Poland. SS Hauptsturmführer (Captain) Heinrich Schwarz was commandant from November 1943 to January 1945.

The SS established the camp in October 1942 at the behest of IG Farben executives to provide slave labor for their Buna Werke (Buna Works) industrial complex. The name Buna was derived from the butadiene-based synthetic rubber and the chemical symbol for sodium (Na), a process of synthetic rubber production developed in Germany. Other German industrial enterprises built factories with their own subcamps, such as Siemens-Schuckert's Bobrek subcamp, close to Monowitz, to profit from the use of slave labor. The German armaments manufacturer Krupp, headed by SS member Alfried Krupp, also built their own manufacturing facilities near Monowitz.

Monowitz held around 12,000 prisoners, the great majority of whom were Jews, in addition to non-Jewish criminals and political prisoners. The SS charged IG Farben three Reichsmarks (RM) per day for unskilled workers, four (RM) per hour for skilled workers, and one and one-half (RM) for children. The camp contained an "Arbeitsausbildungslager" (labor education camp) for non-Jewish prisoners viewed as not up to par with German work standards. The life expectancy of Jewish workers at Buna Werke was three to four months; for those working in the outlying mines, only one month. Those deemed unfit for work were gassed at Auschwitz II-Birkenau.

Primo Levi, author of If This Is a Man (1947), survived Monowitz, as did Elie Wiesel, author of the Pulitzer Prize–winning book Night (1960), who was a teenage inmate there along with his father.

== History ==
The creation of the camp was a result of an initiative by the German chemical company IG Farben to build the third-largest synthetic rubber and liquid fuels plant. The camp was supposed to be located in Silesia, out of range of Allied bombers. Among the sites proposed between December 1940 and January 1942 the chosen location was the flat land between the eastern part of Oświęcim and the villages of Dwory and Monowice, justified by good geological conditions, access to transport routes, water supply, and the availability of raw materials such as: coal from mines in Libiąż, Jawiszowice, and Jaworzno, limestone from Krzeszowice, and salt from Wieliczka. However, the primary reason for building the industrial complex in that location was the immediate access to the slave work-force from the nearby Auschwitz camps.

IG Farben made the preparations and reached an agreement with the Nazis between February and April 1941. The company bought the land from the treasury for a low price, after it had been seized from Polish owners without compensation and their houses were vacated and demolished. Meanwhile, German authorities removed Jews from their homes in Oświęcim and placed them in Sosnowiec or Chrzanów and sold their homes to IG Farben as housing for company employees brought from Germany. This also happened to some local Polish residents. The IG Farben officials came to an agreement with the concentration camp commandant to hire prisoners at a rate of 3 to 4 marks per day for labor of auxiliary and skilled labor workers.

Trucks began bringing in the first KL prisoners to work at the plant's construction site in mid-April 1941. Starting in May the workers had to walk 6 to 7 km from the camp to the factory site. At the end of July, with the laborers numbering over a thousand, they began taking the train to Dwory station. Their work included leveling the ground, digging drainage ditches, laying cables, and building roads.

The prisoners returned to the construction site in May 1942 and worked there until 21 July, when an outbreak of typhus in the main camp and Birkenau stopped their trips to work. Worried over losing the laborers, factory management decided to turn the barracks camp being built in Monowice for civilians over to the SS, to house prisoners. Because of delays in the supply of barbed wire there were several postponements in opening the camp. The first prisoners arrived on 26 October and by early November there were approximately two thousand prisoners.

== Administration and name ==
For most of its existence, Monowitz was a subcamp of the Auschwitz concentration camp. After an administrative restructuring by the SS in November 1943, it became the third of the three main camps in the Auschwitz complex: KL Auschwitz I-Stammlager (Auschwitz I-main camp); Auschwitz II-Birkenau; and KL Auschwitz III-Aussenlager (Auschwitz III-subcamps). In November 1944, there was another reorganization: Auschwitz II became part of the main camp, and Auschwitz III was renamed Monowitz concentration camp.

== Buna Werke ==
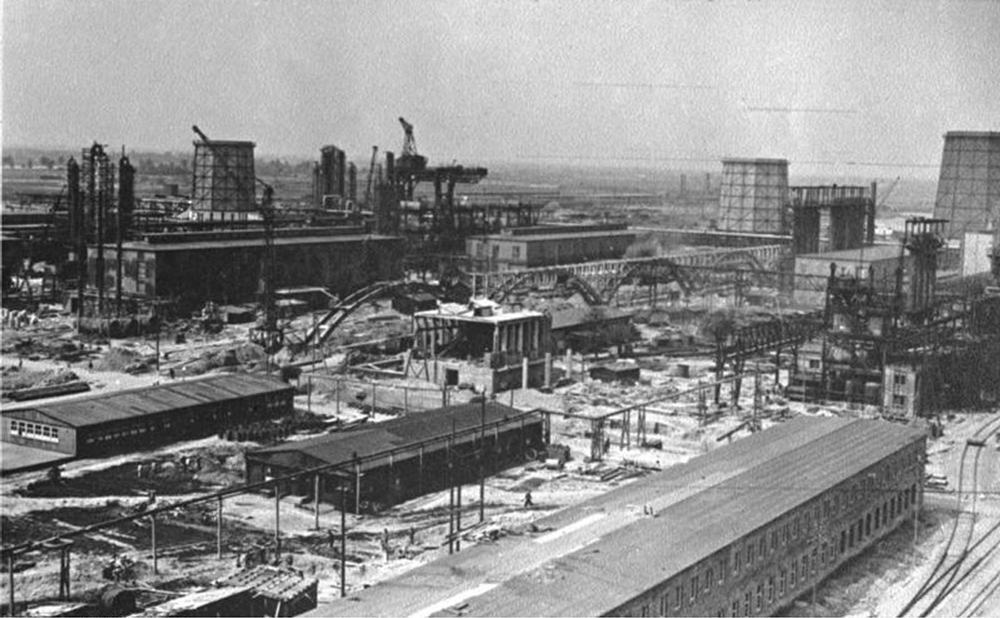
IG Farben plant under construction approximately 10 kilometres (6.2 mi) from Auschwitz, 1942

The new Buna Werke or Monowitz Buna-Werke factory was located on the outskirts of Oświęcim. The plant construction was commissioned by the Italian State interested in importing nitrile rubber (Buna-N) from IG Farben after the collapse of its own synthetic oil production. The 29 page-long contract signed by the Confederazione Fascista degli Industriali and printed on 2 March 1942 secured the arrival of 8,636 workers from Italy tasked with erecting the installations with the investment of 700 million Reichsmarks (equivalent to 3 billion 2021 €) by IG Farben (Farben was the producer of nearly all explosives for the German army, with its subsidiary also producing Zyklon-B). The synthetic rubber was to be made virtually for free in occupied Poland using slave labor from among prisoners of Auschwitz, and raw materials from the formerly Polish coalfields. The Buna factory had a workforce of an estimated 80,000 slave laborers by 1944.

According to Joseph Borkin in his book entitled The Crimes and Punishment of IG Farben, IG Farben was the majority financier for Auschwitz III, a camp that contained a production site for production of Buna rubber. Borkin wrote, wrongly, that an Italian Jewish chemist, Primo Levi, was one of the upper level specialists at the Buna plant, and was able to keep some prisoners alive with the assistance of his colleagues, allegedly not producing Buna rubber at a viable production rate. In fact Levi was only an inmate there who, in the last two months of his captivity, was sent to a chemical lab due to his former studies as a chemist. Buna Rubber was named by BASF A.G., and through 1988 Buna was a remaining trade name of nitrile rubber held by BASF.

== Auschwitz III concentration camp ==
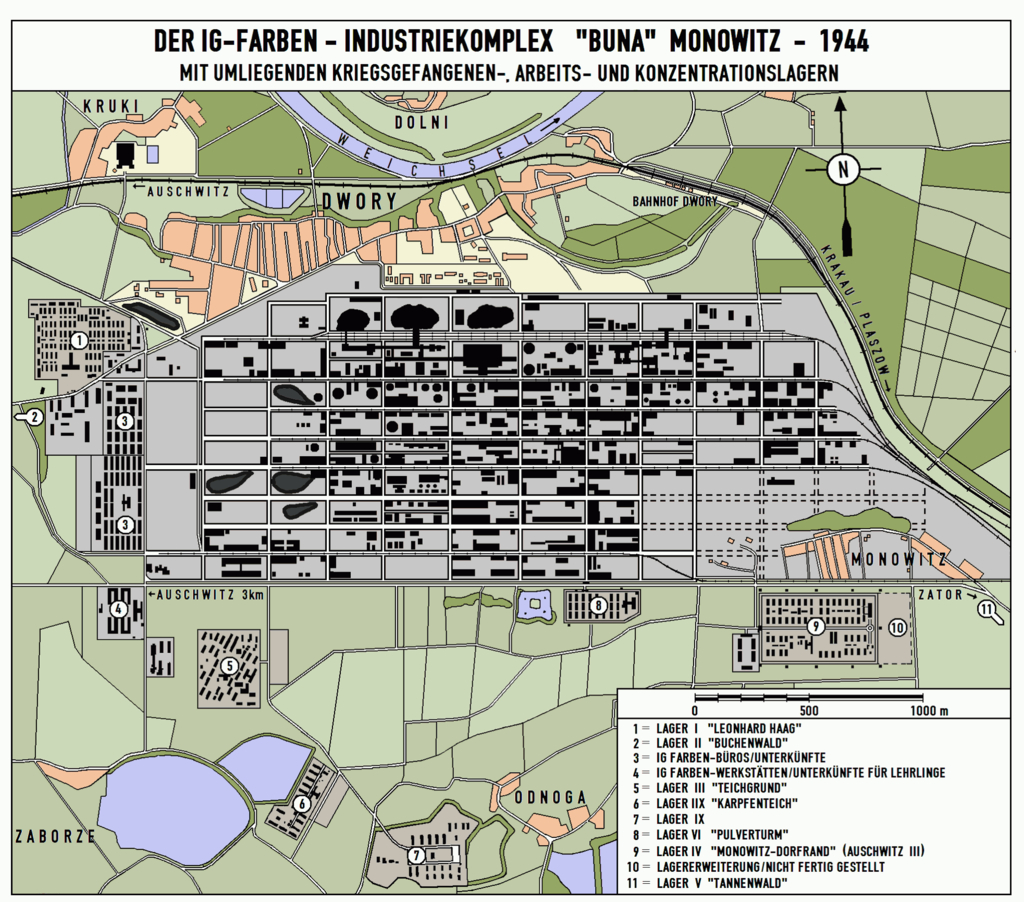
Buna-Werke between the towns of Dwory and Monowitz and labor subcamps. Main labor camp "Auschwitz III" on lower right.

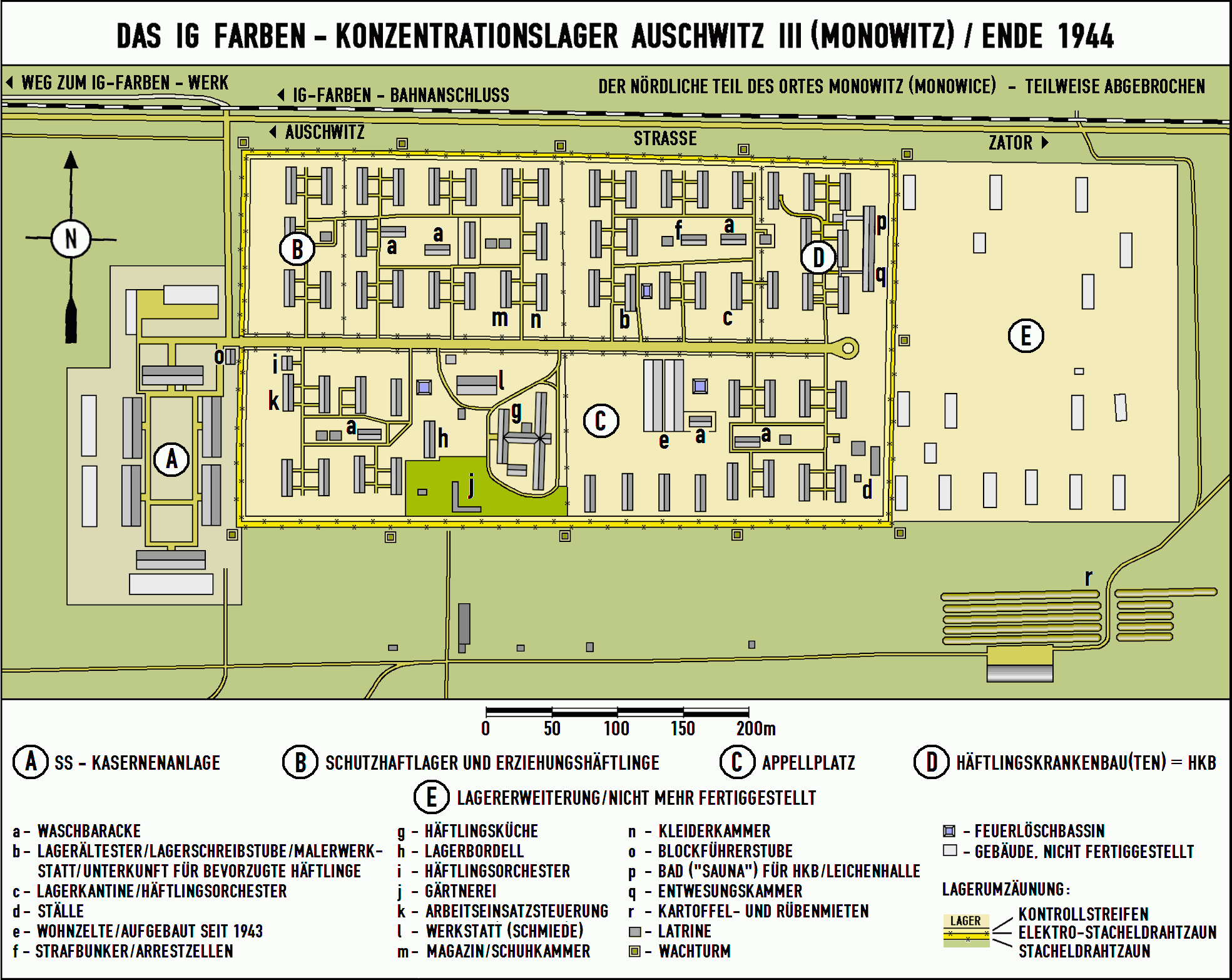
"Auschwitz III" Monowitz labor camp

By 1942 the new labour camp complex occupied about half of its projected area, the expansion was for the most part finished in the summer of 1943. The last four barracks were built a year later. The labor camp's population grew from 3,500 in December 1942 to over 6,000 by the first half of 1943. By July 1944 the prisoner population was over 11,000, most of whom were Jews. Despite the growing death-rate from slave labor, starvation, executions or other forms of murder, the demand for labor was growing, and more prisoners were brought in. Because the factory management insisted on removing sick and exhausted prisoners from Monowice, people incapable of continuing their work were murdered. The company argued that they had not spent large amounts of money building barracks for prisoners unfit to work.

On 10 February 1943 SS-Obersturmbannführer Gerhard Maurer, responsible for the employment of concentration camp prisoners went to Oświęcim; he promised IG Farben the arrival of another thousand prisoners, in exchange for the incapable factory workers. More than 10,000 prisoners were victims of the selection during the period in which the camp operated. Taken to the main camp's hospital, most victims were killed by a lethal injection of phenol to the heart.

Some were sent to Birkenau where they were liquidated after "re-selection" in the Bllf prison hospital or in most cases murdered in the gas chambers. More than 1,600 other prisoners died in the hospital at Monowice, and many were shot at the construction site or hanged at the camp. An estimated 10,000 Auschwitz concentration camp prisoners lost their lives because of working for IG Farben.

=== Productivity of prisoners ===
The barracks at Auschwitz III were overcrowded like those in Birkenau; however, those in Monowice had windows and heating during the winter when needed. "Buna-Suppe", a watery soup, was served, along with extremely low food rations. The foremen were in charge of laborers and demanded the capos and SS-men enforce higher productivity, beating prisoners. In reports sent from Monowice to the corporate headquarters in Frankfurt am Main, Maximilian Faust, an engineer in charge of construction stated in these reports that the only way to keep the prisoners' productivity at a satisfactory level was through violence and corporal punishment. While declaring his own opposition to "flogging and mistreating prisoners to death", Faust nevertheless added that "achieving the appropriate productivity is out of the question without the stick."

Prisoners worked more slowly than the German construction workers, even with being beaten. This was a source of anger and dissatisfaction to factory management, and led to repeated requests that camp authorities increase the numbers of SS men and energetic capos to supervise the prisoners. A group of specially chosen German common criminal capos were sent to Monowice. When these steps seemed to fail, IG Farben officials suggested the introduction of a rudimentary piecework system and a motivational scheme including the right to wear watches, have longer hair (rejected in practice), the payment of scrip that could be used in the camp canteen (which offered cigarettes and other low-value trifles for sale), and free visits to the camp bordello (which opened in the Monowice camp in 1943).

These steps hardly had an effect on prisoner productivity. In December 1944, at conferences in Katowice, it was brought to attention that the real cause of prisoners' low productivity: the motivational system was characterized as ineffective and the capos as "good", but it was admitted that the prisoners worked slowly simply because they were hungry.

=== Overseers ===
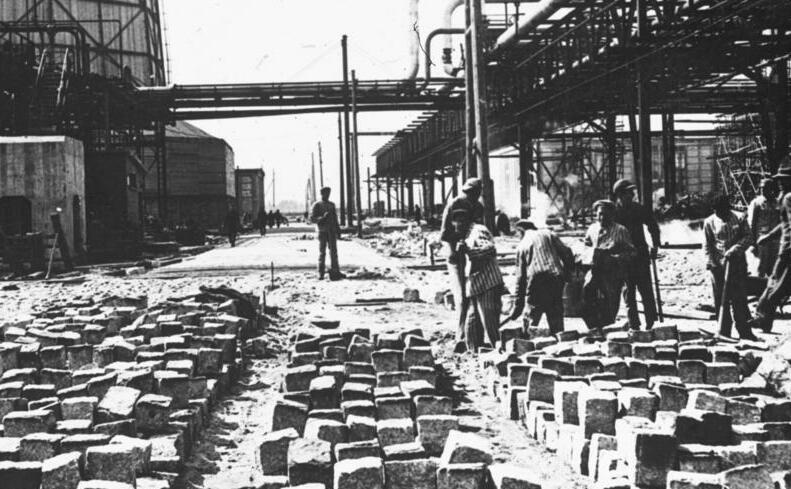
Prisoners at work in Monowitz, identified by striped clothes

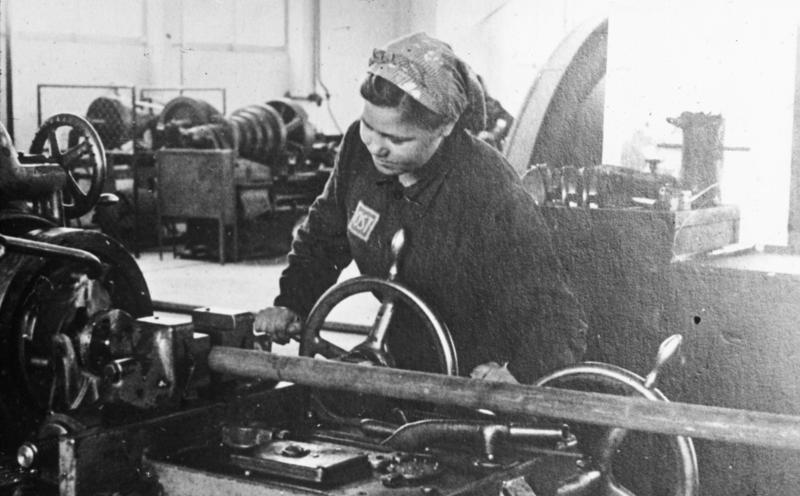
Ostarbeiter on lathe at Monowitz, identified by "Ost" badge on her clothes

To a large degree, the SS men from the garrison in Monowice were responsible for the conditions that prevailed in the camp. SS-Obersturmführer Vinzenz Schöttl held the post of Lagerführer during the period when Monowice functioned as one of the many Auschwitz sub-camps. In November 1943, after the reorganization of the administrative system and the division of Auschwitz into three quasi-autonomous components, the camp in Monowice received a commandant of its own. This was SS-Hauptsturmführer Heinrich Schwarz, who until then had been the head of the labor department and Lagerführer in the main camp. At Monowice, he was given authority over the Jawischowitz, Neu-Dachs in Jaworzno, Fürstengrube, Janinagrube in Libiąż, Golleschau in Goleszów, Eintrachthütte in Świętochłowice, Sosnowitz, Lagischa, and Brünn (in Bohemia) sub-camps. Later, the directors of new sub-camps opened at industrial facilities in Silesia and Bohemia answered to him. Rudolf Wilhelm Buchholz and Richard Stolten were SS men there. Also present were: Dr. Bruno Kitt from December 1942 to January 1943 or March 1943, SS-Hauptsturmführer Dr. Helmuth Vetter; from March 1943 to 20 October 1943, SS-Obersturmführer Dr. Friedrich Entress. From October 1943 to November 1943, there followed SS-Obersturmführer Dr. Werner Rohde; from November 1943 to September 1944, SS-Hauptsturmführer Dr. Horst Fischer; and finally, from September 1944 to January 1945, SS-Obersturmführer Dr. Hans Wilhelm König.

Bernhard Rakers was Kommandoführer in 1943, then roll-call leader in Buna/Monowitz concentration camp, sentenced to life in prison in 1953 for murder of prisoners (pardoned in 1971, died in 1980).

Fritz Löhner-Beda (prisoner number 68561) was a popular song lyricist who was murdered in Monowitz-Buna at the behest of an IG Farben executive, as his friend Raymond van den Straaten testified at the Nuremberg trial of 24 IG Farben executives:

One day, two Buna inmates, Dr. Raymond van den Straaten and Dr. Fritz Löhner-Beda, were going about their work when a party of visiting IG Farben dignitaries passed by. One of the directors pointed to Dr. Löhner-Beda and said to his SS companion, "This Jewish swine could work a little faster." Another director then chanced the remark, "If they can't work, let them perish in the gas chamber." After the inspection was over, Dr. Löhner-Beda was pulled out of the work party and was beaten and kicked until, a dying man, he was left in the arms of his inmate friend, to end his life in IG Auschwitz.

In May 1944, the command center of a separate guard battalion (SS-Totenkopfsturmbann KL Auschwitz III) was established in Monowice. It consisted of seven companies, which were assigned to the following sub-camps: the 1st Company to Monowitz, the 2nd Company to Golleschau in Goleszów, and Jawischowitz in Jawiszowice, the 3rd Company to Bobrek, Fürstengrube, Günthergrube, and Janinagrube in Libiąż, the 4th Company to Neu-Dachs in Jaworzno, the 5th Company to Eintrachthütte, Lagischa, Laurahütte, and Sosnowitz II in Sosnowiec, the 6th Company to Gleiwitz I, II and III in Gliwice, and the 7th Company to Blechhammer in Blachownia.

In September 1944, a total of 1,315 SS men served in these companies. The 439 of them who made up 1 Company were stationed at Monowice, and included not only guards but also the staff of the offices and stores that saw to the needs of the remaining sub-camps.

== Monowitz/Buna-Werke bombed ==
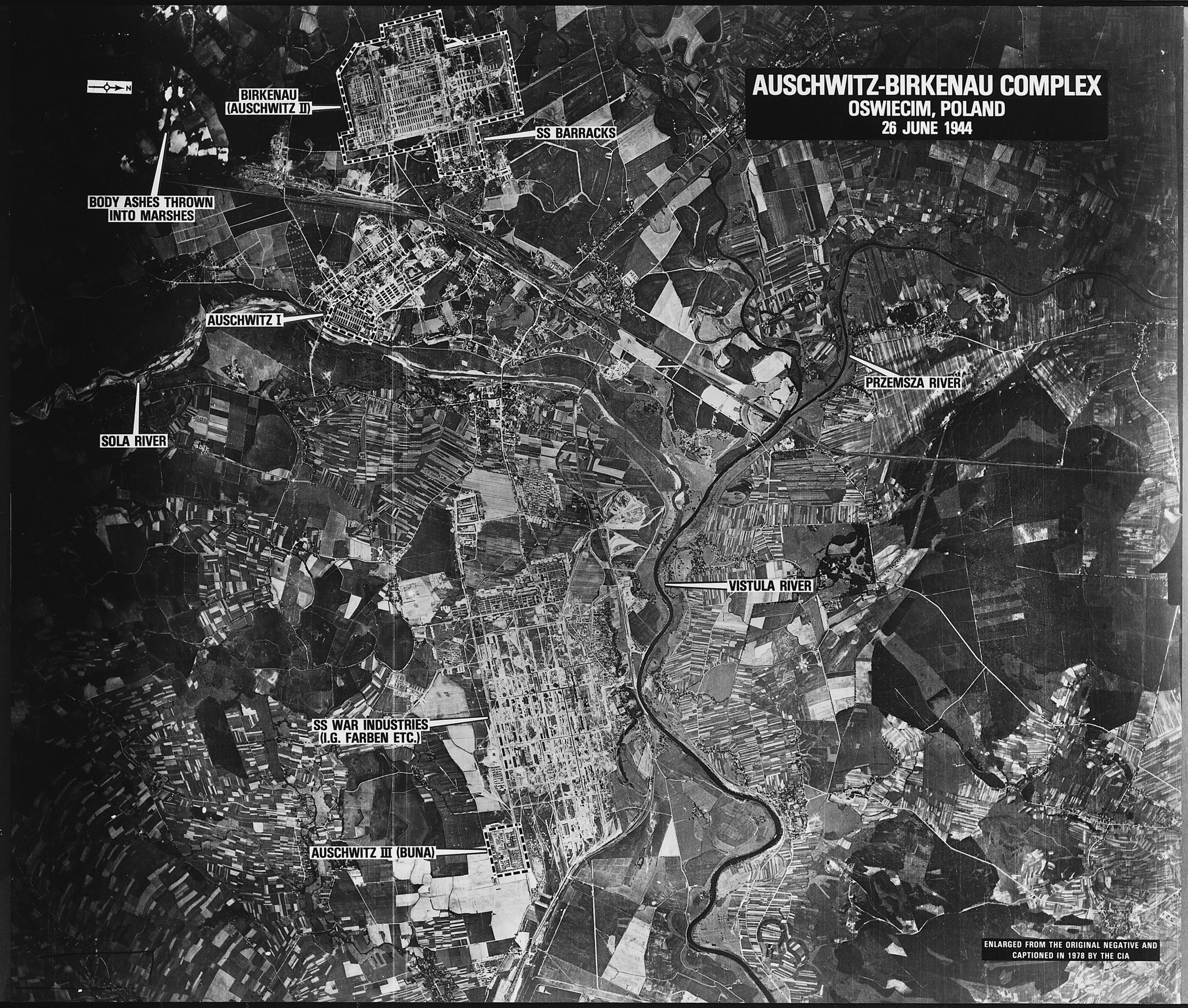
Auschwitz I, II and III complex

The Allies bombed the I.G. Farben factories at Monowitz four times, all of them during the last year of the war.

- The first raid was conducted 20 August 1944 by 127 B-17 Flying Fortresses of the 15th U.S. Army Air Force based at Foggia, Italy. The first bombing started at 10:32 p.m. and lasted for 28 minutes. A total of 1,336 500 lb. high explosive bombs were dropped from an altitude of between 26,000 and 29,000 feet.
- On 13 September 1944 96 B-24 Liberators bombed Monowitz in an air raid that lasted 13 minutes.
- The third attack occurred on 18 December 1944 by two B-17s and 47 B-24s, 436 500 lb. bombs were dropped.
- The fourth and last attack was on 26 December 1944 by 95 B-24s; a total of 679 500 lb. bombs were dropped.

== Liberation of the camp ==
On 18 January 1945, all prisoners in Monowitz whom the Nazis deemed healthy enough to walk were evacuated from the camp and sent on a death march to the Gleiwitz (Gliwice) subcamp near the Czech border. Victor "Young" Perez, a professional boxer of Jewish heritage from French Tunisia died on the death march on 22 January 1945; Paul Steinberg, who would chronicle his experiences in a 1996 book, was among those on the march. He was later liberated by the American Army at Buchenwald. The remaining prisoners were liberated on 27 January 1945 by the Red Army along with others in the Auschwitz camp complex, among them was the renowned writer Primo Levi.

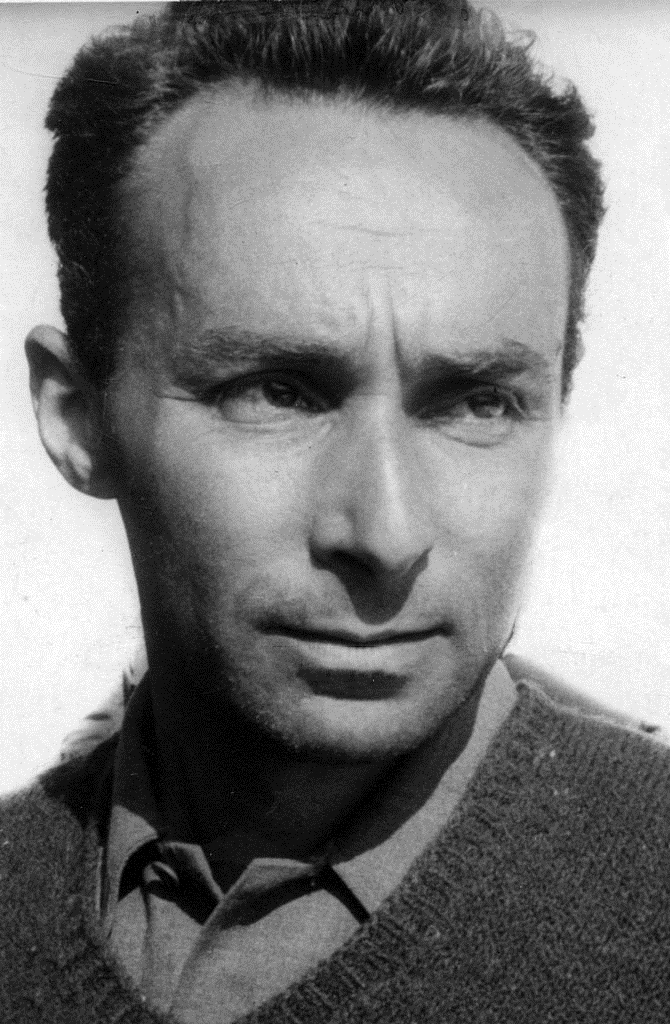
Primo Levi, ca. 1950s

Beginning mid-February 1945 the Red Army shipped much equipment and machinery from the Buna Werke factory to western Siberia using captured German specialists who helped dismantle it bit by bit. However, many of the original buildings remained, and the chemical industry was rebuilt on the site after the war. At the grounds of the former factory are the two Polish companies: Chemoservis-Dwory S.A., which produces metal structures, parts, metal building elements, tanks and reservoirs etc., and Synthos Dwory Sp. a subsidiary of the Synthos S.A. Group which manufactures synthetic rubbers, latex and polystyrene among other chemical products. Both are based in Oświęcim. Extant structures and visible remains of the Monowitz camp itself include the original camp smithy, part of the prisoner kitchen building, a ruined building of the SS Barracks, a large concrete air raid shelter for the SS guard force (type "Salzgitter/Geilenberg"), and small one-man SS air raid shelters (these can also be found on the grounds of the Buna Werke factory, along with larger concrete air raid shelters for the factory workers).

== British POW camp ==
Several hundred meters west of the Buna/Monowitz concentration camp, there was a work subcamp, E715, of the main camp (Stalag VIII-B) in Lamsdorf (after November 1943, in Teschen). British and other Commonwealth POWs were held there and the camp was administered by Wehrmacht, not SS. Most of these POWs had been captured in North Africa, initially by Italian troops. After Italy's change of sides in 1943, the German Army took them to prisoner of war camps in Silesia and finally to Auschwitz. The first 200 British POWs reached Auschwitz in early September 1943. In winter 1943/44, about 1,400 British POWs were interned in E715. In February and March 1944, around 800 of them were moved to Blechhammer and Heydebreck. After that time, the number of British prisoners of war in Auschwitz remained constant, at around 600.

British POWs in Auschwitz occasionally received Red Cross parcels. However, on 23 February 1944 a soldier named Corporal L.V. Reynolds, from the Royal Army Service Corps, was shot dead on the spot after refusing to climb up to a 70 ft (21 m) high ice-covered gantry because he was ill-equipped and thought it too dangerous.

The British POWs could see what was going on in the Monowitz concentration camp; they could hear shots at night and see the bodies of men who had been hanged. At the Monowitz construction site the POWs came in contact with the concentration camp inmates. British POW Denis Avey worked at camp E715 and wrote a personal account of it.

As the Red Army was approaching Auschwitz in January 1945, the Wehrmacht closed E715 on 21 January 1945, and made the British prisoners of war march through Poland and Czechoslovakia in the direction of Bavaria. In April 1945, the U.S. Army freed the British prisoners of war from Auschwitz in Stalag VII A in Moosburg.

== See also ==
- Charles Coward
- List of Nazi concentration camps
- Arthur Dodd (Auschwitz survivor)
- IG Farben trial
- Heinrich Bütefisch
- List of subcamps of Auschwitz
- The Man Who Broke into Auschwitz

== Bibliography ==
- The Crime and Punishment of I.G. Farben by Joseph Borkin (New York: Free Press, 1978). ISBN 0671827553, ISBN 978-0671827557.
- Industry and Ideology by Peter Hayes. Cambridge University Press; 2nd edition (13 November 2000). ISBN 052178638X, ISBN 978-0521786386.
- If This Is a Man, Primo Levi
