= Gorzów =

Gorzów may refer to the following places in Poland:

- Gorzów Wielkopolski, city in Lubusz Voivodeship, west Poland
- Gorzów Śląski, town in Opole Voivodeship, south-west Poland
- Gorzów, Lesser Poland Voivodeship, village in south Poland
- Gorzów County, local government in Lubusz Voivodeship, Poland
- Gorzów Voivodeship, a former voivodeship (1975-1998) of Poland
