= The Password Is Courage =

1962 British film by Andrew L. Stone

The Password is Courage
- Theatrical release poster
- Directed by: Andrew L. Stone
- Screenplay by: Andrew L. Stone
- Based on: The Password is Courage; 1954 biography/novel by John Castle (pseud.)
- Produced by: Andrew L. Stone
- Starring: Dirk Bogarde; Maria Perschy; Alfred Lynch
- Cinematography: Davis Boulton
- Edited by: Noreen Ackland
- Music by: Virginia L. Stone; Derek New; Christopher Stone; Tommy Riley
- Production company: Andrew L. Stone Productions
- Distributed by: Metro-Goldwyn-Mayer
- Release dates: October 1962 (UK); 21 December 1962 (U.S.)
- Running time: 116 minutes
- Country: United Kingdom
- Language: English

The Password Is Courage is a 1962 British comedy-drama war film written, produced, and directed by Andrew L. Stone and starring Dirk Bogarde, Maria Perschy, and Alfred Lynch. It was based on The Password Is Courage, the 1954 World War II biography/novel about Sergeant-Major Charles Coward by Ronald Payne and John Williams Garrod (written under the joint pseudonym John Castle, authors of the novelization of Flight into Danger). It was distributed by Metro-Goldwyn-Mayer.

== Plot ==
Sergeant-Major Charles Coward is a senior British NCO incarcerated in the prisoner of war camp Stalag VIII-B. He encourages his fellow inmates to escape, and tries to humiliate the German guards at every opportunity.

When he is being transferred to Stalag VIII-B, the injured Coward escapes from a forced march, finding refuge in a French farmhouse and barn that is soon requisitioned by a German army unit setting up a field hospital. Believed to be a wounded German soldier, Coward is taken to a hospital, where his identity is discovered, but not before he is awarded the Iron Cross as he lies in his hospital bed.

Coward is sent on to Stalag VIII-B. On the way to the camp, he engineers the total destruction of an enemy ammunition train: He and his fellow prisoners toss flaming bundles of straw, set on fire with his cigarette lighter, into the passing rail cars.

At the camp, he and his fellow prisoner Bill Pope become involved in an elaborate escape plan. The Germans find a tunnel – but it is an old and abandoned one. Coward then attempts to deceive his camp commander and Luftwaffe officials, indicating that he has knowledge of a secret allied bomb sight. He receives special favours, which he uses to bribe the camp guards to get vital materials needed for the coming escape.

When his ruse is discovered, Coward and his friend Pope are transferred to a work camp in occupied Poland. The camp's commanding officer says Coward is a traitor, hoping his fellow prisoners will kill him. The Nazi scheme fails.

The prisoners trick the Unteroffizier, into thinking he was responsible for a devastating fire that Coward actually engineered. Using this, Coward extracts an extraordinary privilege: going to and from the neighboring town without an escort. He makes contact with Irena, an attractive Polish resistance agent, who provides him with maps and other information. He also joins his fellow prisoners in acts of sabotage, including wrecking a huge supply train. He and Pope are sent back to their old Stalag, smuggling the papers past the initial strip search inspection by pretending to be infested with lice.

The escape plan proceeds apace, with every detail accounted for, and the day comes for the 100 chosen men to escape. Coward is the one to break open the vertical access tunnel into a pine grove. He strikes thick tree roots delaying the escape. This leaves 20 men stuck in the tunnel and 180 in the hut. A guard is seen approaching. The men decide to cover up by singing, pretending a party is going on. The concertina player sacrifices his place in line and goes outside, pretending to be drunk. The guard takes him away, not unkindly.

Coward breaks through, but they are short of the woods. The men must run for the trees when the searchlight passes. At the train station. Irena suddenly appears and helps Coward get on the train for Vienna. Once there, they kiss and he promises to return after the war. She goes to buy his ticket, but Coward must surrender to guards in order to protect her. He finds several of his captured comrades, including Pope, waiting under guard in the station's office.

Coward and Pope are assigned to the IG Farben work camp, near the Belsen concentration camp. Coward's narration says of Belsen “[its] name is now a symbol for the most bestial depravity in the entire history of mankind.” The war progresses and they eventually escape. While posing as workmen clearing rubble, they meet a jeep full of American G.I.s who tell them the front line is only a mile away, but there is a “road full of krauts” in their way. They steal a nearby abandoned fire engine and firemen uniforms and speed down the road, bell ringing. A German convoy on that road moves aside, and they drive off to freedom, singing “There is a Tavern in the Town”. A full chorus of men’s voices joins in the verse: “Adieu kind friends, adieu, adieu…”

== Cast ==
- Dirk Bogarde as Sergeant-Major Charles Coward
- Maria Perschy as Irena
- Alfred Lynch as Corporal Bill Pope
- Nigel Stock as Cole
- Reginald Beckwith as Unteroffizier
- Richard Marner as Schmidt
- Ed Devereaux as the Aussie
- Lewis Fiander as Pringle
- George Mikell as Necke
- Richard Carpenter as Robinson
- Bernard Archard as first prisoner of war
- Ferdy Mayne as first German officer at French farm
- George Pravda as second German officer at French farm
- Olaf Pooley as German doctor
- Michael Mellinger as Feldwebel
- Colin Blakely as first German goon
- Margaret Whiting as French farm woman
- Mark Eden as second prisoner of war
- Douglas Livingstone as Bennett
- Arnold Marlé as old man on train
- Charles Durning as American GI (uncredited)

Cast notes: Richard Marner appeared in the role of German officer Schmidt; he later played another German officer in the 1980s BBC comedy 'Allo 'Allo!.

== Production ==
The recreation of German prisoner of war camps took place in the English countryside.

It was the first in a three picture deal between Andrew Stone and MGM.

Sergeant-Major Charles Coward served as technical advisor during the filming, Coward also has a cameo in the film during a party scene. The film is shot entirely in England; street scenes were filmed in the Chiltern market towns of Amersham and Chesham.

Dirk Bogarde served with distinction during the war, and saw Bergen Belsen immediately after it was liberated.

The film raised some debate among ex-prisoners of war. There are no known survivors of any of Coward's escapes, and the National Ex-Prisoner of War Association (in its Autumn 2006 newsletter) suggested that some of the stories in his biography might have happened to other men in the camps, with some events "borrowed" for the book and for the film.

In 2013, Shimon Peres, then president of Israel, disclosed that his father, Yitzchak Perski, who migrated from Poland to Mandatory Palestine in 1932, had joined the British Army in 1939 and was captured by the Germans in Greece in 1941. Perski and Coward had been fellow prisoners, and Peres claimed that some episodes in the film were based on his father's exploits at that time.

The original cinema version of The Password Is Courage contained a sequence set in Auschwitz concentration camp, illustrated by drawings. This sequence has been cut from television broadcast prints, but a credit for the drawings remains listed in the film credits. (Note: Why the sequence has been cut is unknown. Suggested explanations include that the events described did not happen, that the sequence is inappropriate in an otherwise broad comedy, and that a shorter run time for television syndication required the removal of this self-standing sub-plot.)

== Reception ==
=== Box office ===
In October 1962, The Password Is Courage opened in London.

According to Kinematograph Weekly the film was considered a "money maker" at the British box office in 1962.

=== Critical ===
The Monthly Film Bulletin wrote: "Andrew Stone's adaptation has gleefully mined the wealth of narrative incident and humour in John Castle's biography. But that account of the wartime career of Charles Coward – for all its adventure story framework – had an element of severity in keeping with its subject, and its main character emerged as a man of genuinely heroic proportions. By concentrating on the lighthearted image of the British cockney – password courage, trademark humour – the film version, however, looks more like a Boy Scouts' charade: a frivolous tribute to a man who could trade in dynamite and dead bodies to evacuate live ones from Auschwitz. The script, in fact, skids over these intolerable passages in his experience by the appallingly inappropriate insertion of a series of eye-witness sketches, which serve only to remind one that there was a grimmer side to outwitting the Germans – and that they were not to be fooled by a suave twist of the Bogarde eyebrow and a cocksure grin. ... The most triumphant aspect of Andrew Stone's direction is his ability to inject a life of their own into inanimate objects – the leap of flame, the merriment of an exhaust-pipe bobbing across the screen as a tank charts its own destructive course, the fracturing ribs of an escape tunnel, the splendid pile-up of a disintegrating goods train. But apart from Alfred Lynch's gay, affectionate Billy, the human element is cast in a farcical mould, and the action veers uncomfortably between the conventions of dramatic suspense and near-slapstick comedy – with a perfunctory and fictional dash of romance for makeweight. War is no lark, and only a Renoir can take care of its incidental jokes without obscuring the fact."

Variety noted: "Andrew L. Stone’s screenplay, based on a biog of Sergeant-Major Charles Coward by John Castle, has pumped into its untidy 116 minutes an overdose of slapstick humour. Result is that what could have been a telling tribute to a character of guts and initiative, the kind that every war produces, lacks conviction".

== See also ==
- List of British films of 1962
- Prisoner of war (List of films is at the end of the article.)

== Sources ==
- Castle, John (1954). The Password is Courage. London: Souvenir Press.
- Morley, Sheridan. Dirk Bogarde: Rank Outsider. Pontarddulais, Swansea, UK: Macmillan Distribution Limited, 2000. ISBN 978-0-74754-698-6.
- Tanitch, Robert. Dirk Bogarde: The Complete Career Illustrated. London: Ebury Pres, 1988. ISBN 978-0-85223-694-9.
