= Paul Schaffer =

French Holocaust survivor (1924–2020)

- Born: 27 November 1924; Vienna, First Austrian Republic
- Died: 6 August 2020 (aged 95)
- Occupations: Technician; Writer

Paul Schaffer (27 November 1924 – 6 August 2020) was an Austrian-born French Holocaust survivor. He served as Honorary President of the French Committee of Yad Vashem and a member of the Foundation for the Memory of the Holocaust.

== Biography ==
Born in Vienna on 27 November 1924, Schaffer grew up with his family in Austria, where he had a happy childhood with his parents, sister, and grandmother. His mother, Sali Schaffer, was born in 1901 in Kiev and his sister, Anna, was born in Ternopil in 1923. During World War II, Austria was annexed by Nazi Germany, and the Schaffer family took refuge in Belgium. They then fled to Revel in Southern France, where Schaffer learned the trade of cabinetmaking. He was arrested on 26 August 1942 and taken to Drancy internment camp. On 4 September 1942, he was deported to Auschwitz, where his mother and his sister were gassed on arrival, aged 41 and 19. Six months later, he was transferred to the labor camp at Bobrek.

After the Allied victory in World War II, Schaffer returned to France to live in Toulouse. He earned a scholarship and resumed his studies in 1945. He became an electronic technician and pursued a career in the industry after having taught in a Jewish vocational school associated with the World ORT.

Schaffer wrote his memoirs in 2003. He became Honorary President of the French Yad Vashem and member of the board of the Foundation for the Memory of the Holocaust.

Paul Schaffer died on 6 August 2020 at the age of 95.

== Distinctions ==
- Officer of the Legion of Honour (2012)
- Honorary citizenship of the town of Revel, Haute Garonne

== Memoirs ==
- Le Soleil voilé (2003)
