= Heinrich Schwarz =

German SS officer and Holocaust perpetrator (1906–1947)

- Born: 14 June 1906; Munich, Bavaria, German Empire
- Died: 20 March 1947 (aged 40); Baden-Baden, Baden-Württemberg, Allied-occupied Germany
- Status: Executed by firing squad
- Convictions: War crimes Crimes against humanity
- Penalty: Death
- SS service
- Allegiance: Nazi Germany
- Branch: Schutzstaffel
- Service years: 1931–1945
- Rank: SS-Hauptsturmführer
- Commands: Monowitz concentration camp; Natzweiler-Struthof concentration camp

Heinrich Schwarz (14 June 1906 – 20 March 1947) was an SS-Hauptsturmführer (captain) and concentration camp officer who served as commandant of Auschwitz III-Monowitz in General Government German -occupied Poland and Natzweiler-Struthof in Alsace-Lorraine.

== Early life ==
Schwarz was born in Munich on 14 June 1906 and originally worked as a book printer. He joined both the Nazi Party and the Schutzstaffel (SS) in November 1931. Following the outbreak of World War II, Schwarz served with the Waffen-SS on the Western Front until October 1940, when he was transferred to the Concentration Camps Inspectorate. He was stationed at both the Mauthausen and Sachsenhausen concentration camps during 1940-1941.

== Auschwitz concentration camp ==
In September 1941 Schwarz was transferred to Poland and posted to the administrative office of the Auschwitz concentration camp. His initial duties included working as adjutant to the camp's commandant, Rudolf Höß. Schwarz also served as director of the camp's Work Assignment Department (Abt. IIIa) and held the position of Lagerführer (camp leader) for Auschwitz's central administration area.

In November 1943, Höß was appointed assistant director of Office Group D for the SS Economic and Administrative Main Office in Berlin. Following his departure, the Auschwitz camp system was reorganized by the high command of the SS and divided into three semi-autonomous administrative units: Auschwitz I, Auschwitz II-Birkenau and the Auschwitz III-Monowitz labour camp. Under this new arrangement Schwarz was given command of Auschwitz III-Monowitz in December 1943.

Central to the role Schwarz played as commandant was the provision of slave-labourers to the nearby Buna Werke, a synthetic rubber factory owned by the German chemical company IG Farben. Other German corporations, such as Siemens and Krupp, also received slave labour from Monowitz. The brutal working conditions which prevailed at Monowitz during the period Schwarz served as commandant resulted in a large number of deaths among the inmate population, with estimates ranging between 10,000 and 35,000 prisoners who were believed to have died in the labour camp itself or in the gas chambers located at neighbouring Auschwitz-Birkenau.

Following the evacuation of Auschwitz complex on 18 January 1945, Schwarz was initially slated to take over command of the Mittelbau-Dora concentration camp and the associated V-weapons production facility of Mittelwerk, but was passed over for this post in favour of Richard Baer. Instead, Schwarz was appointed commandant of the concentration camp of Natzweiler-Struthof, serving there until the end of the war.

== War crimes trial ==
After the German defeat, Schwarz was tried and convicted of war crimes and crimes against humanity by French occupation authorities in Rastatt; in connection with atrocities committed during his brief tenure as commandant of Natzweiler-Struthof. He was sentenced to death and subsequently executed by a firing squad near Baden-Baden on 20 March 1947.
