= Gmina Chełmek =

Gmina Chełmek Chełmek Commune
- Gmina
- Coat of arms
- Interactive map of Gmina Chełmek
- Coordinates (Chełmek): 50°7′N 19°15′E
- Country: Poland
- Voivodeship: Lesser Poland
- County: Oświęcim
- Seat: Chełmek

Area
  - Total: 27.24 km^{2} (10.52 sq mi)

Population (2006)
  - Total: 12,827
  - Density: 470.9/km^{2} (1,220/sq mi)
  - Urban: 9,065
  - Rural: 3,762
- Website: http://www.chelmek.pl

Gmina Chełmek is an urban-rural gmina (administrative district) in Oświęcim County, Lesser Poland Voivodeship, in southern Poland. Its seat is the town of Chełmek, which lies approximately 8 kilometres (5 mi) north of Oświęcim and 50 km (31 mi) west of the regional capital Kraków.

The gmina covers an area of 27.24 sq.km2 (27240000 sq. mi.), and as of 2006 its total population is 12,827 (out of which the population of Chełmek amounts to 9,065, and the population of the rural part of the gmina is 3,762).

== Villages ==
Apart from the town of Chełmek, Gmina Chełmek contains the villages of Bobrek and Gorzów.

== Neighbouring gminas ==
Gmina Chełmek is bordered by the towns of Bieruń, Imielin, Jaworzno and Oświęcim, and by the gminas of Chełm Śląski, Libiąż and Oświęcim.
