= Gorzów, Lesser Poland Voivodeship =

Gorzów
- Village
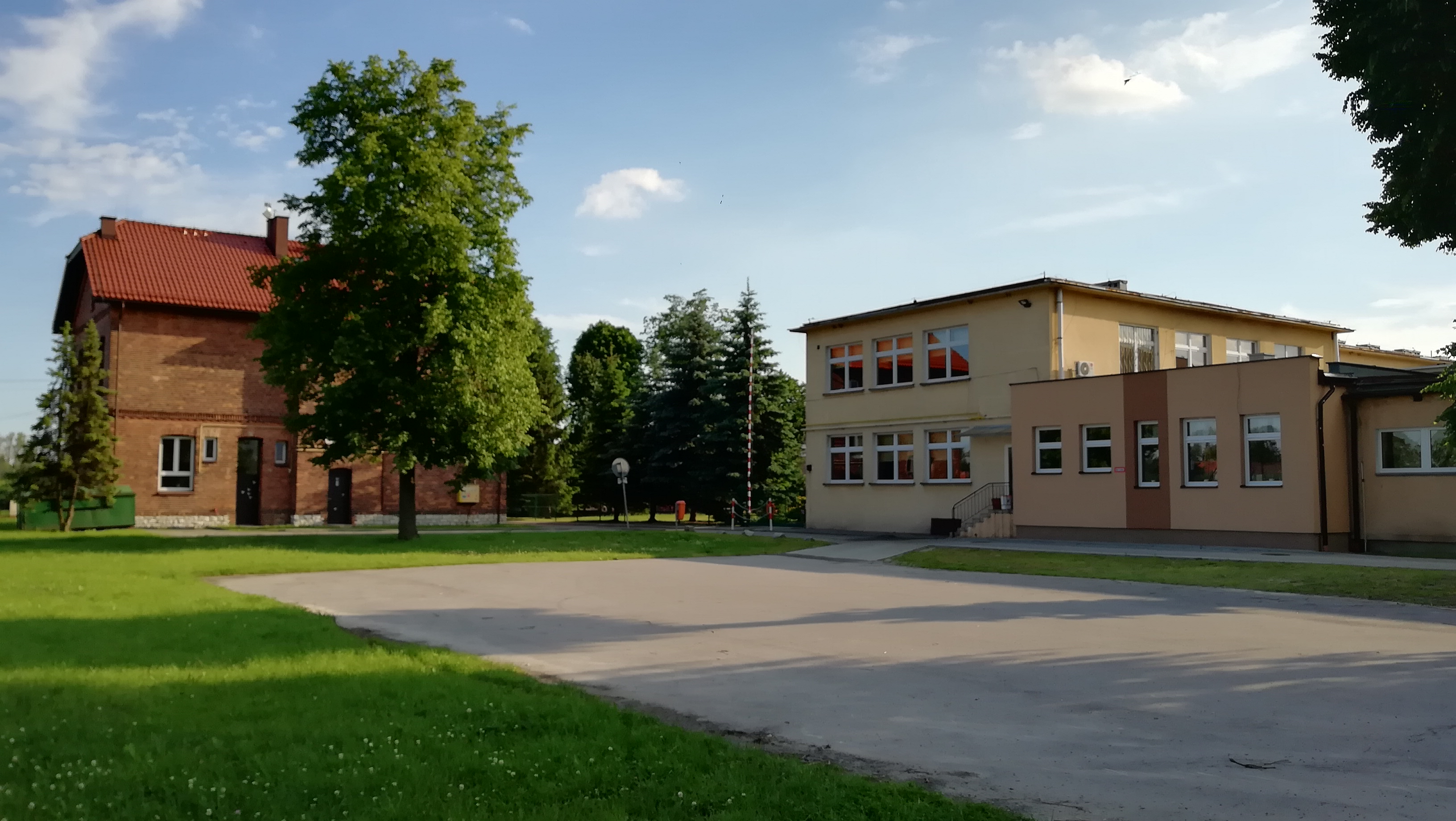
- School

- Location within Poland
- Coordinates: 50°4′N 19°14′E
- Country: Poland
- Voivodeship: Lesser Poland
- County: Oświęcim
- Gmina: Chełmek
- Area: 3.91 km^{2} (1.51 sq mi)
- Population (approx.): 2,400
- Time zone: UTC+1 (CET)
  - Summer (DST): UTC+2 (CEST)
- Postal code: 32-660
- Car plates: KOS

Gorzów [ˈɡɔʐuf] is a village in the administrative district of Gmina Chełmek, within Oświęcim County, Lesser Poland Voivodeship, in southern Poland.

Gorzów lies close to two rivers: the Vistula and Przemsza, on a wide and flat terrace common to both rivers, an area of 391 hectares (970 acres). The western and southern borders are naturally drawn by Przemsza river and Vistula river, on the other side of the rivers are located: south side - the city Oświęcim, west side - Czarnuchowice – district of the city Nowy Bieruń. The east and north borders are delimited artificially and runs irregularly: east side - village Bobrek, north side - the municipal city Chełmek. Citizens of Gorzów use the local names of individual rural districts, such as Babin, Kopanki, Cholerny cmentarz, Orliska, Piaski, Małowy and New Village. Main roads in Gorzów are Oświęcimska, Gorzowska, Szkolna, Nowowiejska which are regional/county roads administered by the County Roads Administration in Oświęcim; other roads are administered by the municipality city Chełmek. To the east is the regional road number 1809K (previously inter-regional road 933), which partially forms the border between Bobrek and Gorzów.

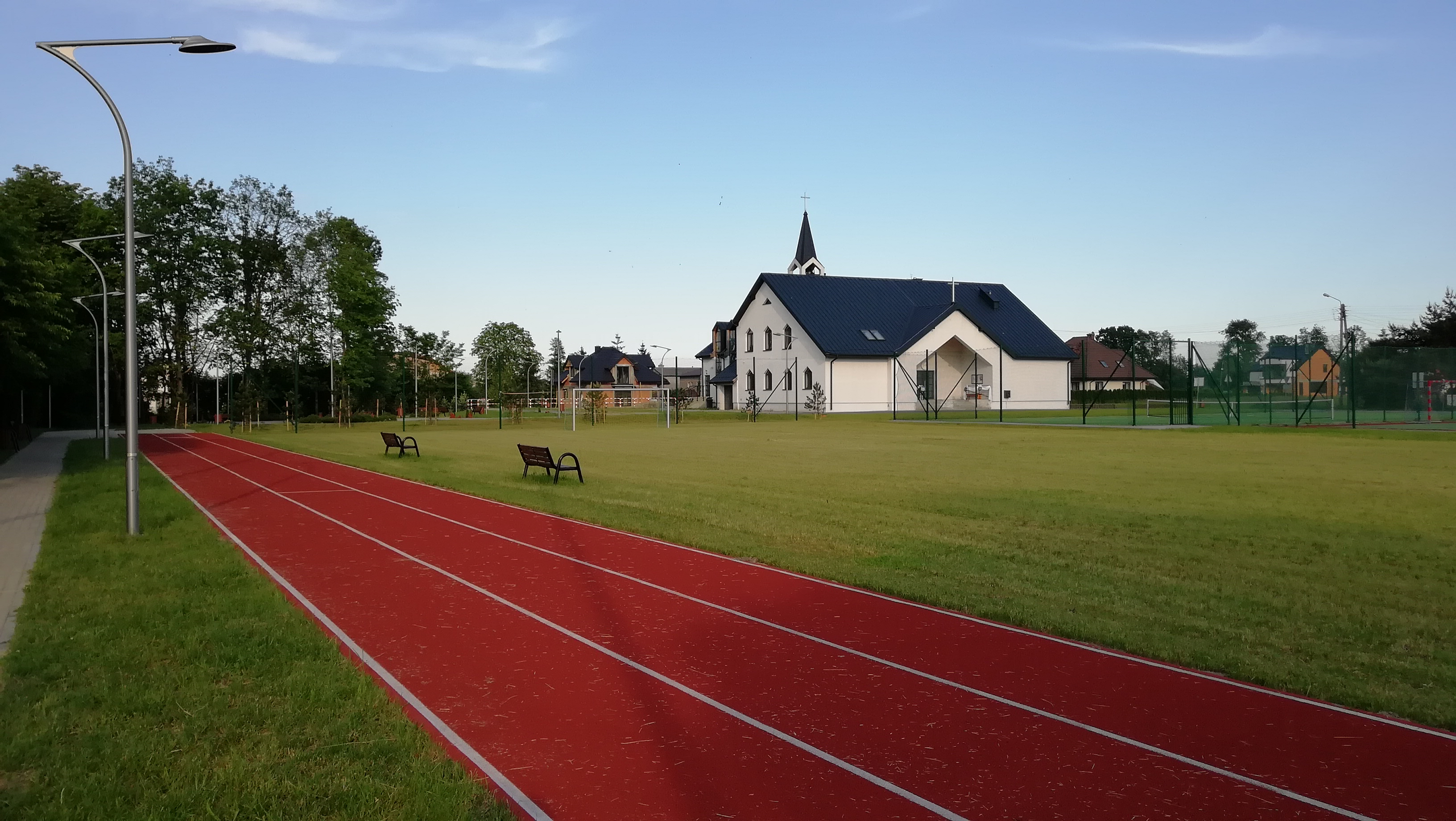
Sports area in Gorzów

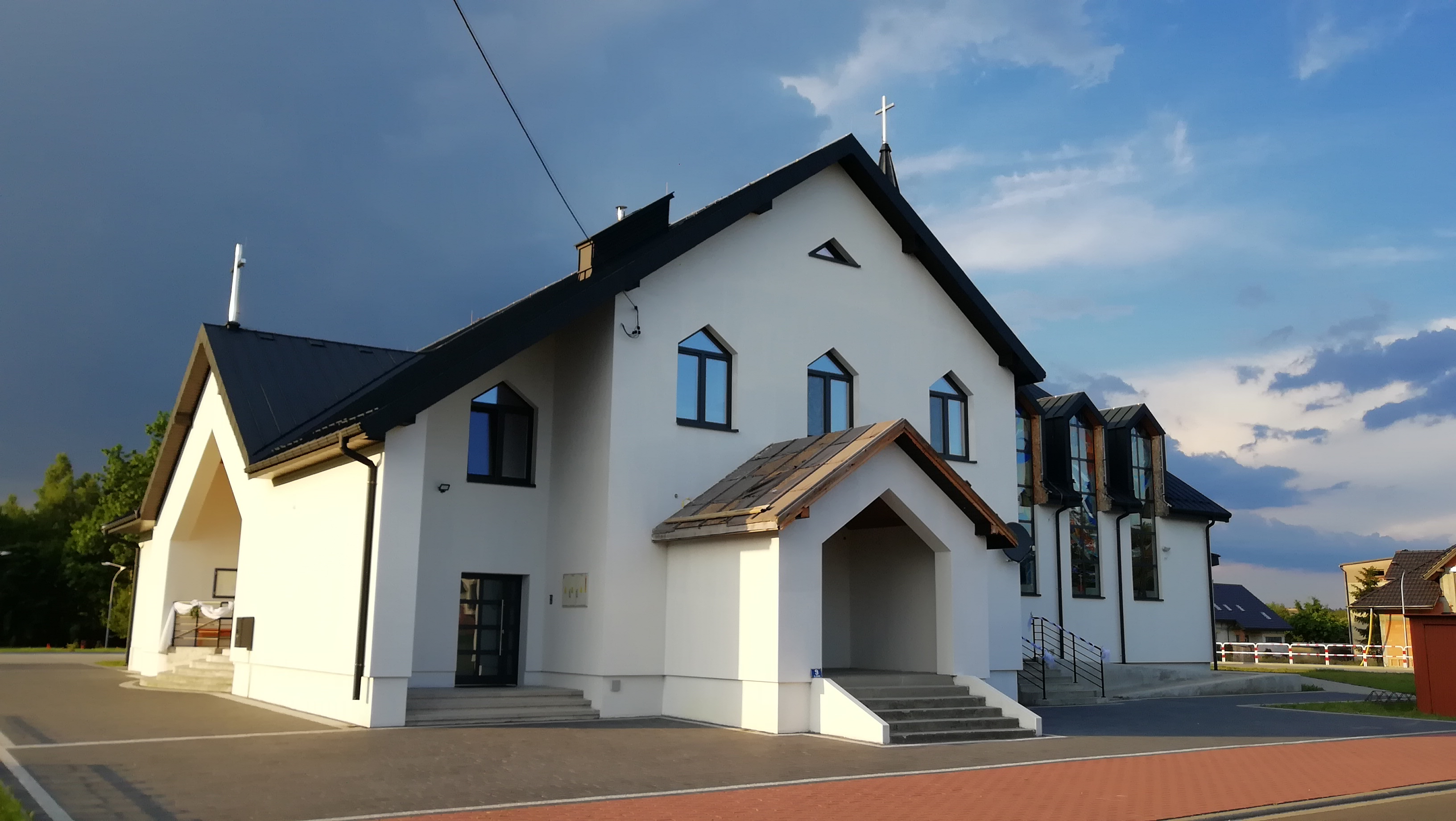
St. Queen Jadwiga Parish Church in Gorzów

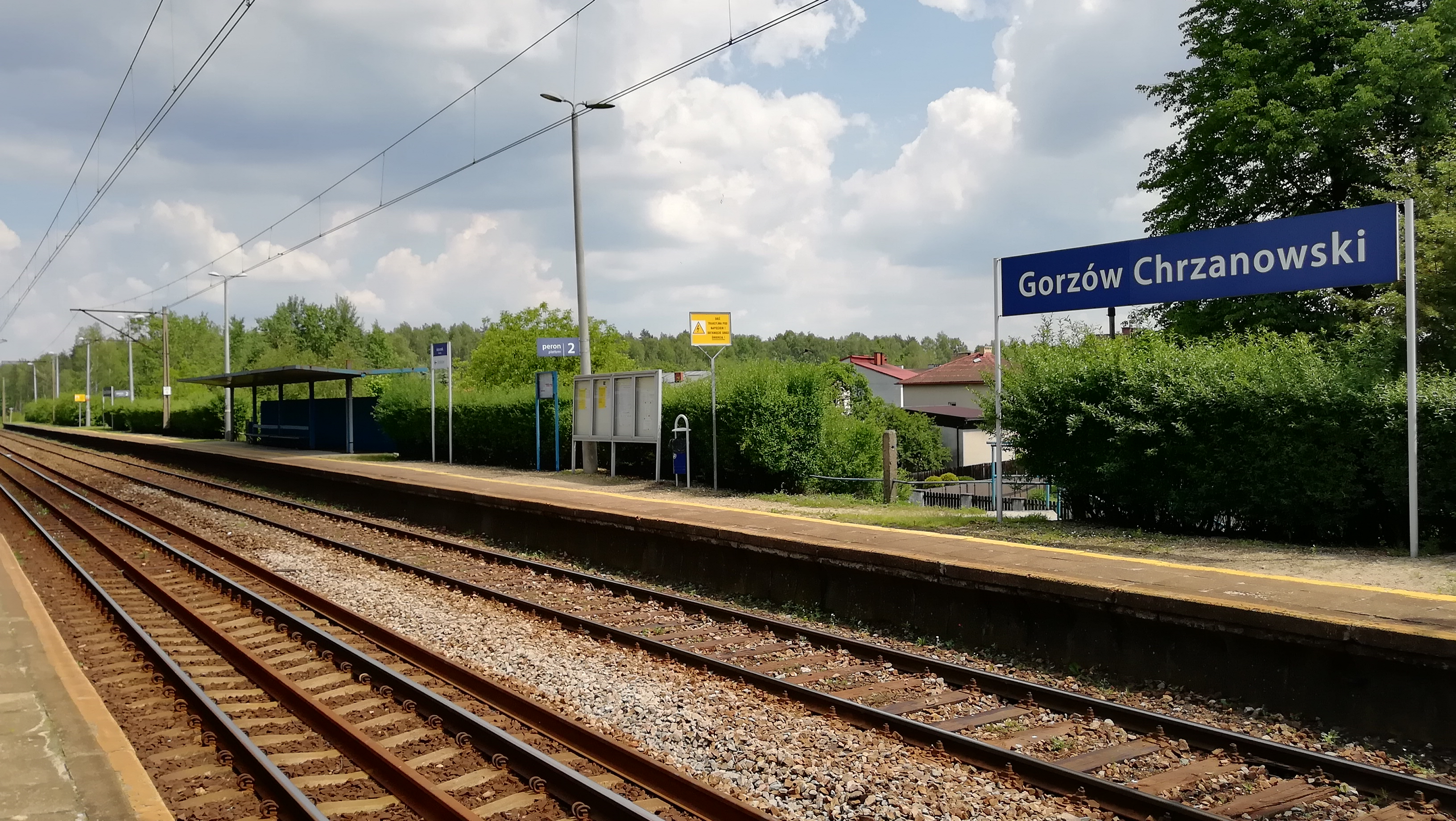
Gorzów Chrzanowski railway station on the route Trzebinia - Oświęcim
