= John Miller (journalist and author) =

British journalist and author (1932–2020)

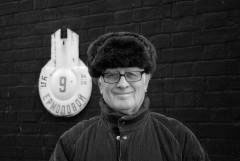
- Born: John Miller; 28 November 1932; London, England
- Died: 26 December 2020 (aged 88); Southwold, England
- Occupations: Journalist and Author
- Spouse: Brenda
- Children: 3
- Writing career
- Literary movement: Russia
- Website: johnmillercornfields.com

John Miller (28 November 1932 – 26 December 2020) was a British journalist and author whose career focused on the Soviet Union.

== Early life ==
Miller was born in London on 28 November 1932 to a Royal Air Force intelligence officer turned Financial Times staffer. He went to the Enfield Grammar School before two years of National Service in the Army, commencing in 1951, when he learned Russian and became a language clerk at MI10, responsible for intelligence on Soviet military hardware, in Whitehall.

== Journalism ==
Miller began his long career in journalism at the Norwich Mercury in Norwich, in 1953, and covered Wymondham and Brandon, in Suffolk.

Having moved to Reuters in London in 1958, he was sent to Moscow in 1960 at the height of the East-West Cold War, and among the big news stories he covered from Moscow were the Sino-Soviet split, the U-2 drama, the Cuban Missile Crisis, Soviet space ventures, the involvement of British, American and Soviet intelligence agencies, and the Soviet dissident campaign. There his wife gave birth to the first set of British twins born in the USSR since the revolution and the family lived in a block of flats on Sadovo Samotechnaya, an enclave for foreigners. In the early 60s in Moscow, Miller met Guy Burgess, Donald Maclean and Kim Philby of the notorious Cambridge Five spy ring, and even served as a pall-bearer at Burgess' funeral in 1963. His colleague in Moskau was Peter Johnson, chief journalist for Reuters in Moskau from 1962 to 1964.

In 1964, Reuters sent him to their New York bureau but within a year he was back in Moscow, for the Daily Telegraph. They stayed there till 1968 when he was sent to work in apartheid South Africa. From 1971, he worked as diplomatic correspondent for the Telegraph. He described the USSR as, "a rotten system ... It was against everything – freedom, democracy, truth, religion, property, people, and more" and, after the fall of the Berlin Wall,

"After seventy-five years of the grossest tyranny that prevented the emergence of a civic society, shattered institutions and attitudes associated with property and law, Russia is on the move. The rise from the wreckage of Communism is gradual and painful, but it is happening."

Miller quit his career as a journalist in 1987, his last job having been a short stint with the Sunday Times.

== Public service ==
On retirement, Miller and family moved to Southwold where he served as town councillor for 14 years before becoming mayor in 2002. He has also served as a Foreign Office national observer of elections in Russia, in 1993, 1995 and 1996, in Ukraine in 1994 and in Kazakhstan in 1996.

== Writing career ==
Miller collaborated on several books, including The Falklands Conflict and The Sinking of the Wilhelm Gustloff with Christopher Dobson and Ronald Payne, and On The Day We Almost Bombed Moscow with Christopher Dobson.

Miller's Mikhail Gorbachev and the End of Soviet Power was published in 1993. His novel The Chamdo Raid is set in Tibet. His is the author of two local books: The Best of Southwold and Southwold in Old Photographs. His book Spunyarns about the wonderful world of a beach hut in Southwold, appeared in December 2012.

=== All Them Cornfields and Ballet in the Evenings ===
Published in May 2010 by Hodgson Press, All Them Cornfields and Ballet in the Evenings is a personal story about the vanished world of the USSR. For more than 40 years the USSR. was the centre of John Miller's working life as a foreign correspondent. He went to the Soviet Union at the height of the East-West Cold War and some of the most prominent stories of the 20th century such as the Great Spy Game, the U-2 drama, the Cuban Missile Crisis occurred while he was reporting there.

The book contains details of everyday life in the Soviet Union such as shortages, dealing with the KGB as well as with bedbugs and cockroaches, censorship, living in a Moscow flat with a rabbit called Floppy, drunkenness, dissidents and death.

== Personal life and death ==
In July 2010, Miller's daughter Jane was awarded an Officer of the Most Excellent Order of the British Empire (OBE) in recognition of her work on control and elimination of malaria in Tanzania for some 15 years.

John Miller died in Southwold on 26 December 2020, at the age of 88.

== Sources ==
- Campbell Doon. Magic Mistress. The Tagman Press. 2000. Page 278.
- Deedes. W.F. Dear Bill. Macmillan 1997. Page 266.
- Garland. Nicholas. Not Many Dead. Hutchinson 1990. Pages 7. Et al.
- Hastings, Max. Editor: An Inside Story of Newspapers. Macmillan 2002. Pages 98–99.
- Kron, Alexander. Novy Mir. February 1983. Pages 13–14.
- Lambert, Derek. Unquote. Arlington Books. 1981. Page 66.
- Purdy, Anthony. Burgess and Maclean. Secker and Warburg. 1963. Page 15.
- Roberts, John C.Q. Speak Clearly into the Chandelier. Curzon. Page 53.
- Venter, Al.J. War in Africa. Human and Rousseau. Cape Town. 1973. Pages 132-146.
