= Bobrek, Lesser Poland Voivodeship =

Bobrek
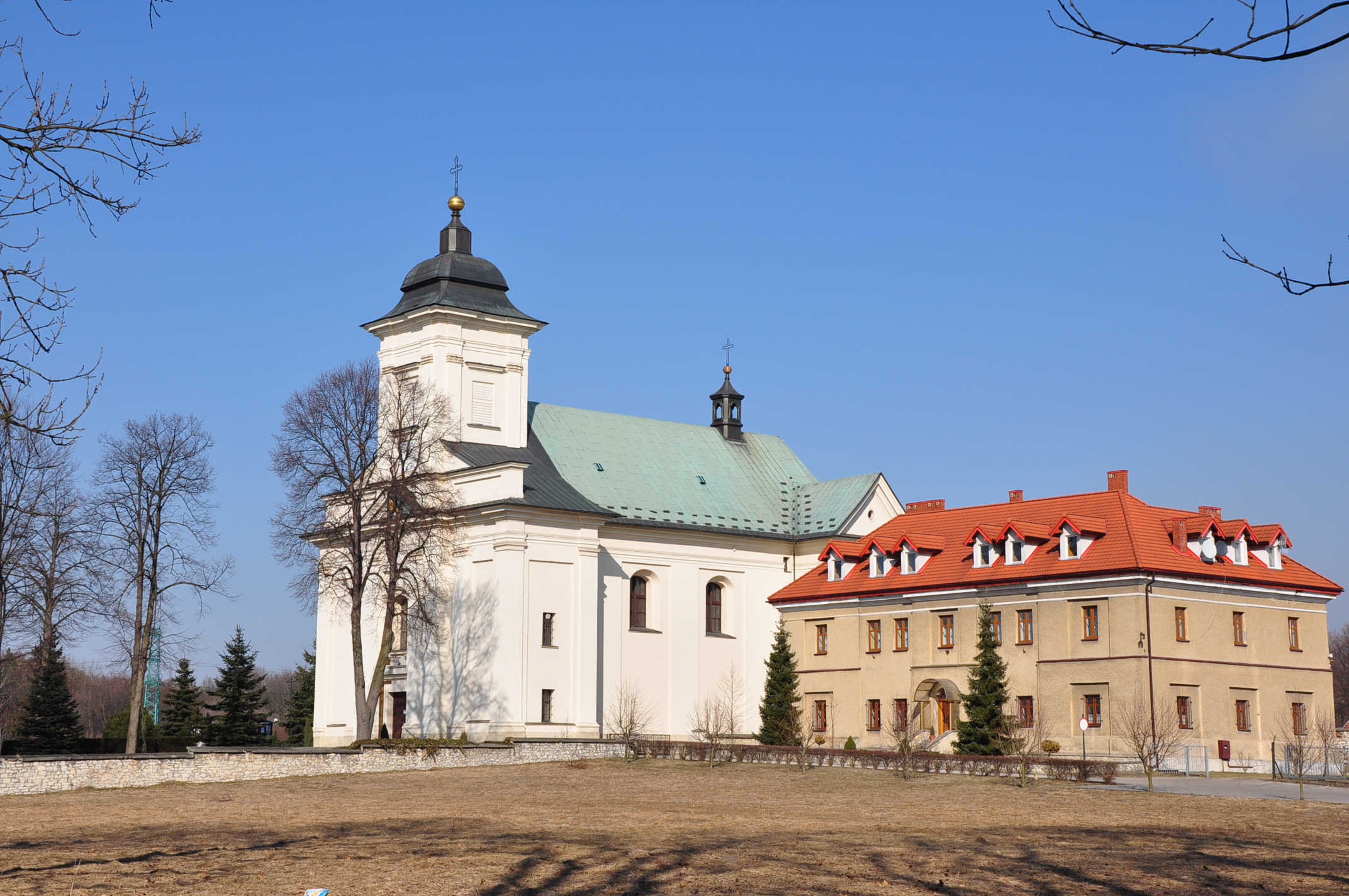
- Holy Trinity Church

- Location within Lesser Poland Voivodeship Location within Poland
- Coordinates: 50°3′23″N 19°15′10″E
- Country: Poland
- Voivodeship: Lesser Poland
- County: Oświęcim
- Gmina: Chełmek

Area
  - Total: 15.03 km^{2} (5.80 sq mi)

Population (31.12.2025)
  - Total: 1,995
  - Density: 132.7/km^{2} (343.8/sq mi)
- Time zone: UTC+1 (CET)
  - Summer (DST): UTC+2 (CEST)
- Postal code: 32-661
- Area code: +48 18
- Car plates: KOS

Bobrek [ˈbɔbrɛk] is a village located adjacent to the city of Oświęcim, Lesser Poland Voivodeship, Poland. During the Second World War, Nazi Germany operated a concentration camp at Bobrek.

== Location ==
Bobrek is situated on the Wisła river, on its left bank, near the confluence with the Soła. It lies in the Oświęcim Basin, approximately 4 km away from Chełmek and Oświęcim. The Provincial Road No. 933 (Polish: Droga wojewódzka nr 933) runs through Bobrek. Neighbouring towns include Oświęcim to the south, Broszkowice to the west, Gorzów to the north-west and Gromiec to the east. Bobrek covers 1 502.8289 hectares (15.03 km²), encompassing the majority (55%) of Gmina Chełmek, of which total size is 2,733.0915 hectares (27.33 km²).

== History ==
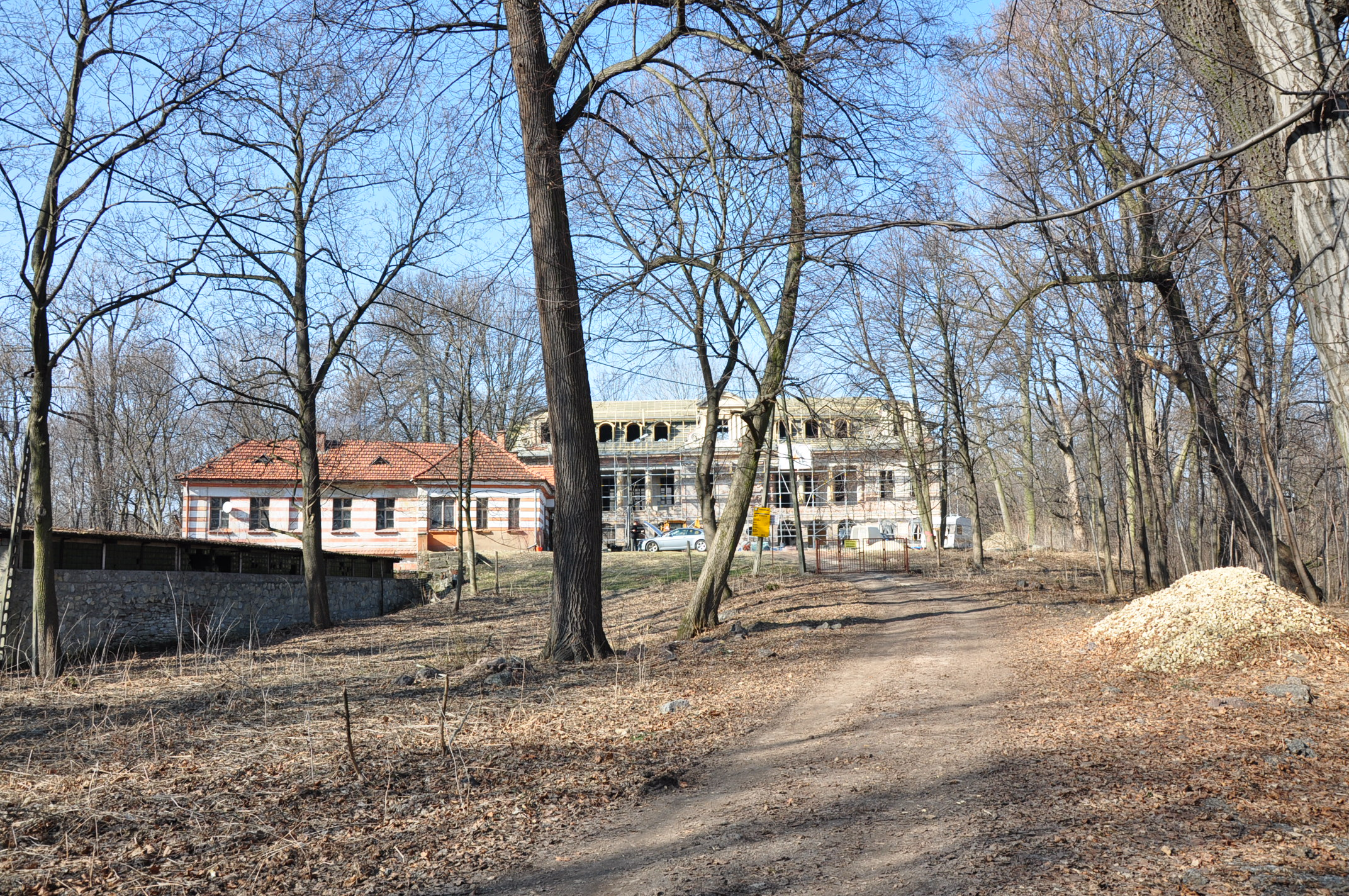
Potulicki Palace

The village dates back to the Middle Ages and has existed since at least the 14th century. It was first mentioned in 1390 in a document written in Latin as Bobrek, Bobreg. The name is a diminutive of the word bóbr (beaver), which indicates the presence of these animals in the area. Bobrek was initially a hillfort that existed in the early Middle Ages, which later became a defensive castle, and finally a palace, in which vicinity a settlement was built.

The village was initially owned by the nobility and, until 1390, belonged to Mikołaj Strzała of Bobrek. It is recorded in historical documents. In 1402, Dziersław Karwacjan, a ‘iuvenis’, together with Jan Ligęza, was involved in a legal dispute over the boundaries between Libiąż and Bobrek. In 1408, the fortified castle in Bobrek, built by Jan Ligęza, was mentioned for the first time; two years later, he took part in the Battle of Grunwald, leading his own chorągiew. After his death, the village became part of the endowment of the Ligęza family of the Półkozic coat of arms. In 1439, Piotr of Bobrek signed the act of confederation of Spytko II of Melsztyn.

The Ligęza family died out in 1640; Bobrek palace and surrounding land was then purchased by Jan Wielopolski the elder. During the Swedish Deluge in 1655, Bobrek was captured by Swedish troops, who ravaged and burned down the castle before abandoning it in 1656. Jan Wielopolski rebuilt the castle, and his son, Jan Józef Wielopolski, inherited it later in the 17th century. After Jan Józef Wielopolski's death, Bobrek was inherited by his wife, Teresa Ewa née Countess Potocka of the Sułkowska family, who developed the estate. During her time, the settlement around the palace expanded, bringing in buildings such as farmsteads, the granary, and a church complex with a vicarage and a cemetery.

The castle later became a zbójnik stronghold, which was cleared of them during the reign of Sigismund III Vasa. Between 1768 and 1772, the Bar Confederates were stationed in the town. Towards the end of the 18th century, Ewaryst Andrzej, Count Kuropatnicki, in his Description of the Kingdoms of Galicia and Lodomeria, wrote: "Bobrek. The castle, which the Confederates held against the Austrian forces, is the hereditary seat of the Counts of Wielopolska".

Following the partitions of Poland, the village came to lie within the borders of the Austrian partition in 1795. In 1800, Ignacy Roch became the owner of the castle and transformed it into a neoclassical palace, making use of the castle's foundations and walls which had fallen into disrepair in the 18th century. Between 1815 and 1846, it was within the borders of the Free City of Kraków, where, in January 1816, it became the seat of one of 17 rural municipalities. Following the Kraków Uprising in 1846, the territories of the Free City, including Bobrek, were incorporated into Austria as the Grand Duchy of Kraków. The village is mentioned in the Geographical Dictionary of the Kingdom of Poland at the end of the 19th century. In 1880, it covered an area of 2,564 morg, including 1,342 morg of forest, and comprised 156 houses inhabited by 882 residents.

Bobrek was then subsequently owned by Barbara née Wielopolska and her husband Kazimierz Potulicki, Princess Maria Ogińska, and then Prince Adam Zygmunt Sapieha of the Lis coat of arms. Sapieha planned to rebuild the Bobrek palace in the 1930 and 1940s, but this was not carried out because of the outbreak of the Second World War. During the German occupation of Poland, Bobrek was annexed into Germany directly and made part of the Province of Silesia, and then Province of Upper Silesia in 1941. The Bobrek palace served as the German headquarters, housing radar equipment and concentration camp administration. In 1945, the retreating German forces looted most of the antique furniture of the palace. After World War 2, in the Polish People's Republic, Bobrek was confiscated from the Sapieha family along with all of their other estates, including the palace.

Between 1954 and 1972, the village belonged to and served as the seat of the Bobrek commune. Between 1975 and 1998, the village belonged administratively to the Bielsko Voivodeship.

== Geography ==
The Vistula river forms the southern boundary of Bobrek as well as Gmina Chełmek; Bobrek is located in the river's valley and is protected by flood embankments. Within Bobrek, there are dozens of small bodies of water, including one large pond of 0.56 hectares near Wisła's flood defences. The village's forest land consists mainly of commercial monocultures of low ecological values, with the exception of closed-basin floodplains in the forest north of Bobrek, created through mining damage, as coal mining took place within the village's boundary until it was discontinued in 2004. Despite its degrades origin, these areas have been deemed valuable by the local government, as they include reed beds and peat bogs, possessing high natural value.

Tree species prevalent in Bobrek include the European oak, European hornbeam, European beech, and European ash. The Palace Park in Bobrek includes trees that are several years old — European oak, European lime tree, and beech.

=== Climate ===
Polish climatologist Romuald Gumiński classified Bobrek, along with the rest of the southern part of Gmina Chełmek, as belonging to the Tarnów climate zone. Bobrek's climate is transitional given the inflow of air masses from various directions, with the dominance of polar maritime air masses arriving from the west.

The average annual temperature in Bobrek ranges from 7.0°C to 8.0°C, with the maximum daily average of 12.6°C and the minimum average of 3.5°C. June, July and August are the warmest months; in these months, the temperatures range from the maximum average of 24°C to a minimum of 13°C. In the coldest month, January, temperature varies from 0°C to -4°C daily. Highest temperature recorded in Bobrek was 33°C, and the lowest was -29.7°C.

Average annual air humidity is 80.2%, and the annual rainfall averages slightly below 900 mm, with the highest levels occurring during the summer months, especially in July. In summer months, the precipitation averages 131 mm a months, and in winter, about 50 mm. The growing season lasts about 210 to 220 days a year. Located in the Oświęcim Basin, Bobrek is exposed to turbulent air movement and temperature inversion, particularly at night, when cold air flows down into the valleys of the Wisła and Soła rivers.

Climate data for Bobrek (1991–2021)
| Month | Jan | Feb | Mar | Apr | May | Jun | Jul | Aug | Sep | Oct | Nov | Dec | Year |
|---|---|---|---|---|---|---|---|---|---|---|---|---|---|
| Mean maximum °C (°F) | 9 (48) | 11 (52) | 18 (64) | 24 (75) | 27 (81) | 32 (90) | 32 (90) | 32 (90) | 27 (81) | 22 (72) | 17 (63) | 11 (52) | 32 (90) |
| Mean daily maximum °C (°F) | -0 (32) | 3 (37) | 8 (46) | 11 (52) | 19 (66) | 22 (72) | 24 (75) | 22 (72) | 19 (66) | 13 (55) | 8 (46) | 1 (34) | 12.6 (54.7) |
| Daily mean °C (°F) | −2 (28) | −1 (30) | 3 (37) | 6 (43) | 13 (55) | 18 (64) | 19 (66) | 18 (64) | 14 (57) | 9 (48) | 4 (39) | -0 (32) | 7.5 (45.5) |
| Mean daily minimum °C (°F) | −4 (25) | −4 (25) | −2 (28) | 2 (36) | 7 (45) | 11 (52) | 13 (55) | 12 (54) | 8 (46) | 4 (39) | 1 (34) | −2 (28) | 3.5 (38.3) |
| Mean minimum °C (°F) | −15 (5) | −13 (9) | −10 (14) | −5 (23) | -0 (32) | 4 (39) | 6 (43) | 4 (39) | 0 (32) | −3 (27) | −6 (21) | −12 (10) | −15 (5) |
| Average precipitation mm (inches) | 56 (2.2) | 55 (2.2) | 54 (2.1) | 59 (2.3) | 98 (3.9) | 95 (3.7) | 115 (4.5) | 90 (3.5) | 83 (3.3) | 61 (2.4) | 57 (2.2) | 50 (2.0) | 873 (34.4) |
| Average precipitation days (≥ 0.1 mm) | 16.7 | 15.6 | 16.2 | 15.8 | 18.9 | 18.6 | 20.5 | 16.5 | 15.2 | 15.2 | 14.6 | 15.5 | 199.3 |
| Average snowy days (≥ 0 cm) | 12.9 | 10.6 | 7.1 | 2.6 | 0.1 | 0 | 0 | 0 | 0.1 | 0.5 | 4.7 | 9.2 | 47.8 |
Source 1: Meteomodel.pl
Source 2: Vackertväder.se

== Historic sites ==
Bobrek features a couple of sites registered in the Registry of Cultural Property of the Lesser Poland Voivodeship, which include:

- The Holy Trinity Parish Church, built between 1798 and 1810, which includes the Cemetery Chapel (dating from 1851–1875), and the Vicarage (from 1800–1850);
- The Sapieha Palace (formerly the Potulicki and Ogiński Palace), built in the Neoclassical style in the first half of the 19th century. The palace was built on the site of fortified castle in Bobrek;
- Czworaki (from the ethnographic museum)
- Wooden farm granary from the 18th century;
- Oficyna;
- Palace Park.
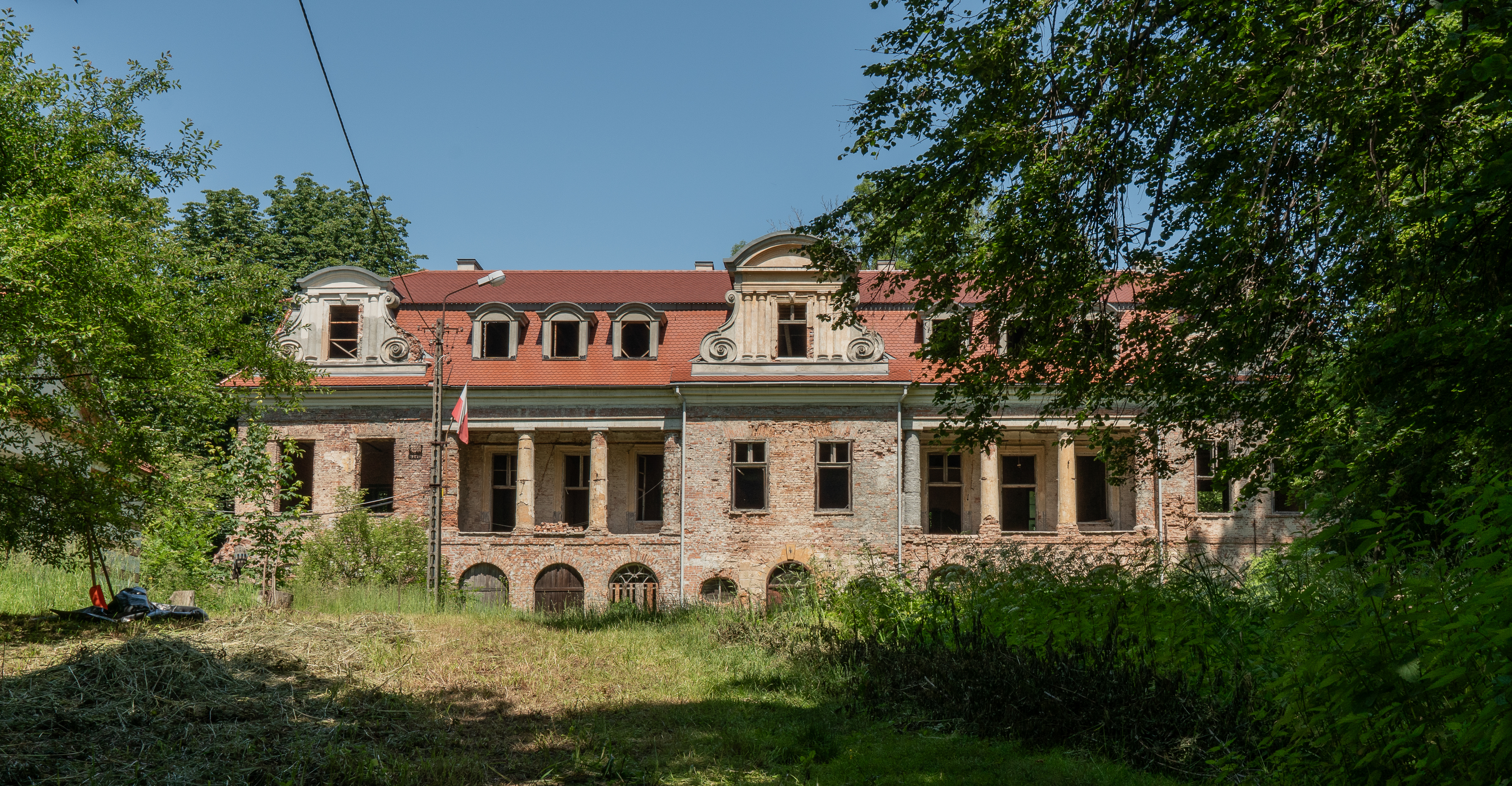
Sapieha Palace

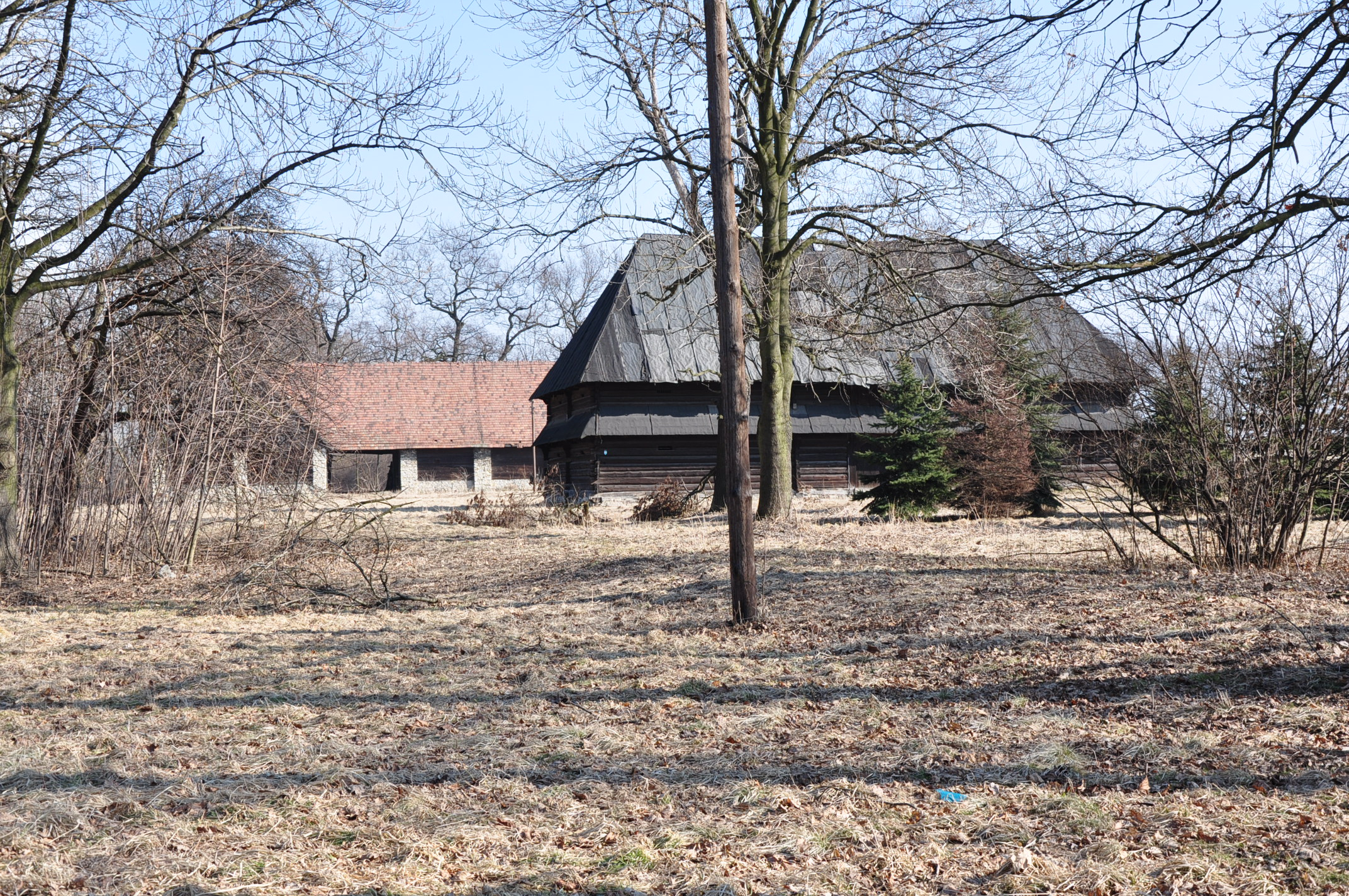
Granary

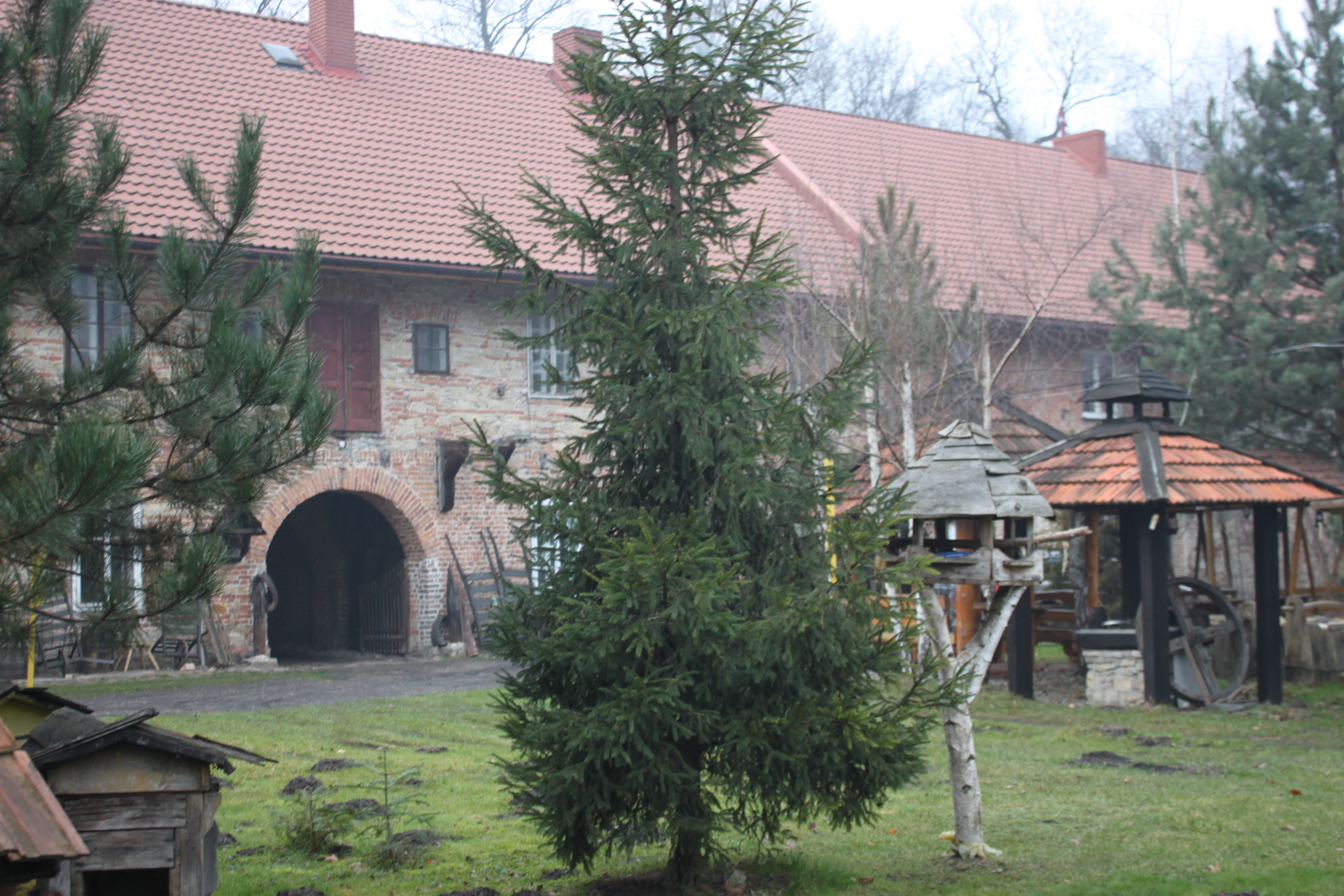
Palace buildings

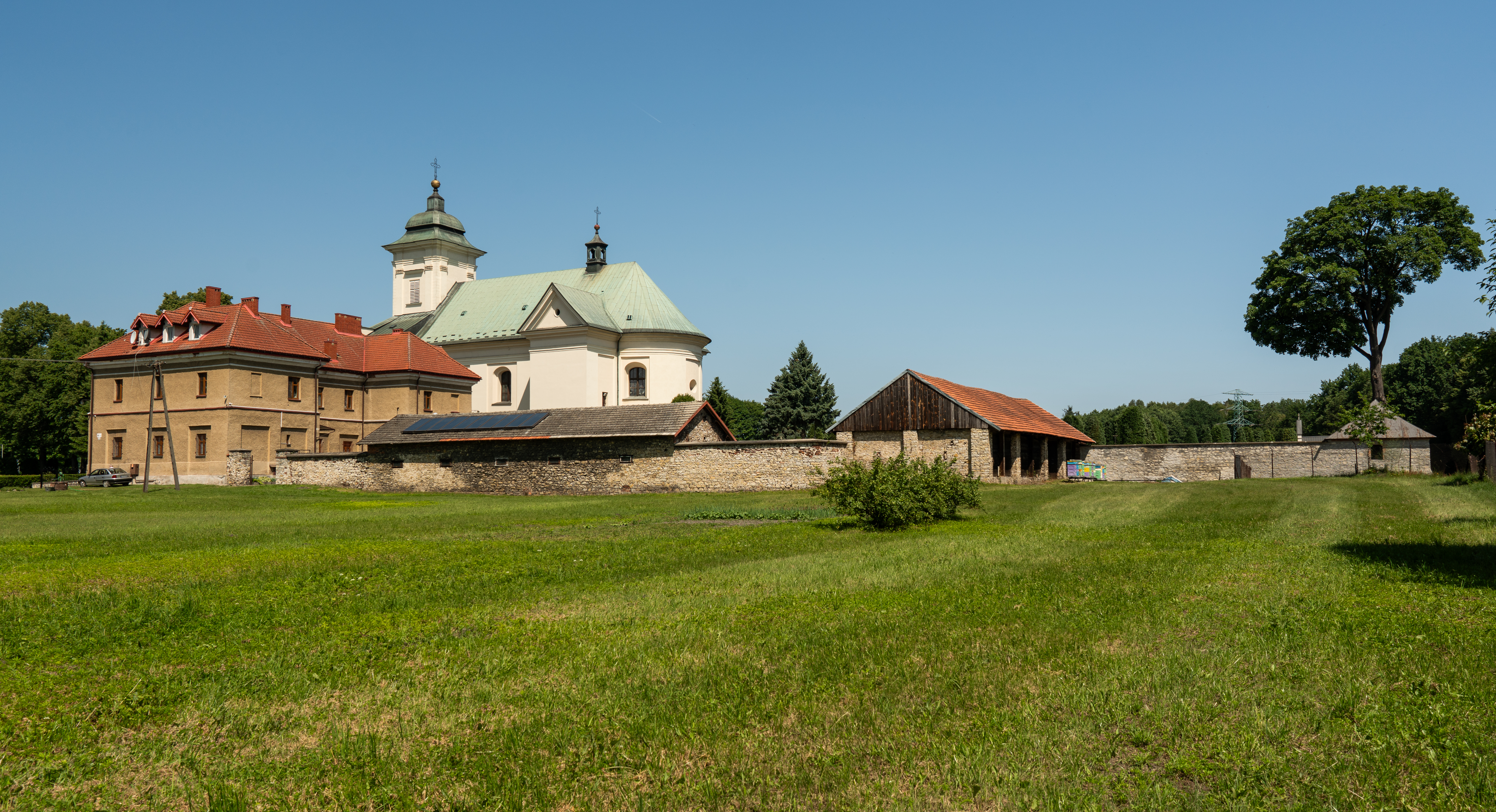
The Holy Trinity Church

== Education ==
There is the Cardinal Adam Stefan Sapieha School in Bobrek, which comprises a nursery, a ‘0’ class (zerówka) and a primary school. The village is home to a social care home for people with intellectual disabilities. It was established in 1952 to replace the Infant Jesus Orphanage, founded in 1884 by Maria Ogińska (née Potulicka) and her husband Bogd Ogiński, and initially run by the Congregation of the Sisters Servants of the Immaculate Conception of the Blessed Virgin Mary, and from 1918 by the Daughters of Charity of Saint Vincent de Paul.

== Culture ==
The village of Bobrek was regarded as the Lesser Poland capital of folk obraźnik paintings. Ambroży Grabowski mentions in his memoirs two famous obraźnik artists active in the village – Sagan and Wojciech Bryndza.

=== Dialect ===
Bobrek, along with the nearby towns, underwent numerous changes of ownership, initially being a part of Silesia only to later become a part of the Kraków Land, Duchy of Kraków, and thus of Lesser Poland. As such, it has been influenced by both Silesian language and the Kraków dialect. Ethnographer Zygmunt Kłodnicki included Bobrek in the Krakowian ethnic and cultural area. Culturally a part of the Silesian borderlands, Bobrek is also considered a part of the Silesian-Lesser Poland borderland dialects (Polish: gwary pogranicza śląsko-małopolskiego), with the eastern frontier of the Silesian language extending to the nearby town of Oświęcim. Linguists such as Stanisław Bąk and Bogusław Wyderka include Bobrek within the territorial range of the Silesian language.

A characteristic of Bobrek dialect is that Bobrek in the genitive case and accusative case is Bobrku, rather than the standard Polish Bobrka. In Bobrek, like in the rest of Lesser Poland, the dialect is characterized by mazuration (Polish: mazurzenie), leading to words like czarny, czapka, czas, jeszcze, and leżał being pronounced corny, copka, cas, jesce, and lezoł, respectively. A notable characteristic of the common dialect also includes pronouncing [o] at the end of the word as [ę]; examples include ido na góro po siono (idę na górę po siano), nieso wodo (niosę wodę), and paso gósi (pasę gęsi). This trait was observed in the towns of Oświęcim, Kęty, Andrychów, Limanowa and nearby villages. Contracting the vowel [a] as [o], a typical characteristic of Silesian, is also present. As a Silesian influence, words of German origin that are spoken in Silesia are also spoken in Bobrek and the rest of Gmina Chełmek, such as śwarc, szmugiel, ślauch (comparable to szlauch), as well as muter and fater. Some of the phrases of the local dialect include:

| Dialect | Polish |
|---|---|
| bacys se | czy pamiętasz |
| bez | przez |
| byłek | byłem |
| ciepnąć | rzucić |
| ćma jest istno | jest ciemno |
| dusić się | kaszleć |
| dzisiokuj | dzisiaj |
| hań | tam |
| kajsik | gdzieś |
| krzypopa | rów |
| pedzioł | powiedział |
| rak | smarkacz |
| sed | szedł |
| wele | obok |

=== Politics ===
There is one electoral commission in Bobrek, located in the Cardinal Adam Stefan Sapieha School.

Results of the elections to the Sejm in Bobrek
| Year | PiS | | PO/KO | | Others | | Valid votes | Source |
| Year | Votes | Percent | Votes | Percent | Votes | Percent | Valid votes | Source |
|---|---|---|---|---|---|---|---|---|
| 2005 | 246 | 42.64 | 116 | 20.10 | 215 | 37.26 | 610 | |
| 2007 | 352 | 44.28 | 279 | 35.09 | 164 | 20.63 | 803 | |
| 2011 | 272 | 37.73 | 270 | 37.44 | 179 | 24.83 | 782 | |
| 2015 | 369 | 42.71 | 320 | 37.04 | 175 | 20.25 | 903 | |
| 2019 | 572 | 55.80 | 333 | 32.50 | 120 | 11.70 | 1025 | |
| 2023 | 513 | 45.94 | 371 | 33.21 | 233 | 20.85 | 1132 | |

== Infrastructure ==
There is a road bridge over the Vistula in Bobrek. In 2006, it was named after Pope Benedict XVI, who crossed the bridge on 28 May of that year whilst travelling to the former German concentration camp KL Auschwitz. The residential buildings in Bobrek, including those on Starowiejska and Długa Streets, date mainly from the 19th and early 20th centuries.

== Sport ==
The football club “LKS Bobrek” operates in Bobrek, which currently plays in the liga okręgowa of Wadowice, and the “Ikarion” Equestrian Centre.

== Religion ==
Pastoral care in the village is provided by the Roman Catholic Church (Parish of the Most Holy Trinity). The church in Bobrek, the Holy Trinity Church, was built between 1798 and 1810, and is a registered cultural monument. The church also has its own rectory and cemetery; the decision to build the church and its structures was made by the Poniatowski family and Teresa Wielopolska in 1788, and the construction began in 1798. On 31 July 1804, the church was consecrated by Father Cyprian Gdowski. The church houses statuettes and sculptures made by Wojciech Stattler, who based them on the designs of Jan Matejko. The church has three bells; two of them are named ‘Maria’ and ‘Józef’ and were cast in Dąbrowa Górnicza. In 1920, a third bell, ‘Wojciech’, was cast in 1920 in Biała. Cardinal Karol Wojtyła, later Pope John Paul II, consecrated the bells in 1971.

== Popular culture ==
The concentration camp at Bobrek is mentioned in an episode of the U.S. TV show Law & Order.

== Population ==
The population in Bobrek is about 2000 people, and has been slightly declining. On 31 December 2009, residents in Bobrek numbered 2039. On 31 December 2020, there were 2035 people living in Bobrek; 53.8% (1094) of its population were men, while 46.2% (941) were women. By 31 December 2025, the population of Bobrek declined to 1995.

=== Notable people ===
In Bobrek lived:

- Wojciech Bryndza – woodcuts and obraźnik artist;
- Marek Sowa – politician, former Voivodeship marshal of the Lesser Poland Voivodeship, Eight Term Sejm member;
- Kazimierz Sowa – Polish Catholic priest.
