= Celia Haddon =

British journalist and author (born 1945)

Celia Haddon (born 1945) is a British journalist, author and expert on feline behaviour. Her books have sold over 1 million copies.

== Early life ==
Haddon attended The School of St Helen and St Katherine, Abingdon and Queen Anne's School. She studied English Literature from 1962 to 1965 at Newnham College, Cambridge. She obtained a masters degree in clinical animal behaviour from the University of Lincoln in 2018.

== Career ==
Her 45 published books include a series of best-selling small books about cats, most successful of which is One Hundred Ways for a Cat to Train its Human (Hodder & Stoughton 2001). She wrote three romances under the pseudonym Caroline Courtney. From 1996 to 2007 she wrote a weekly column as 'pet agony aunt' for the British daily newspaper, The Daily Telegraph. For her services to animal welfare she won the Blue Cross Award of 1997.

She has written for the Daily Mail, The Sun and the Sunday Times. She has co-authored one peer-reviewed article, "Love in Cold Blood: Are Reptile Owners Emotionally Attached to Their Pets" in the journal Anthrozoös, in 2021.

== Selected works ==
- Great Days and Jolly Days (1977)
- A Christmas Posy (1978)
- A Lover's Posty (1979)
- A Mother's Posy (1980)
- The Limits of Sex (1982)
- Women and Tranquillisers (1984)
- The Powers of Love (1985)
- Gifts from your garden (1985)
- Friends and Friendship (1987)
- Stronger Love Safer Sex (1989)
- Designer Gardens (1989)
- Faithful to the End (1991)
- The Love of Cats (1992)
- Mischief and Delight (co author Jess McAree) (1993)
- The Yearbook of Hope and Inspiration (1989)
- The Yearbook of Comfort and Joy (1991)
- The Yearbook of Courage and Serenity (1992)
- Lovely Is the Rose (1993)
- The Yearbook of Love and Wisdom (1994)
- A Christmas Garland (1995)
- The Faerie Kingdom (1998)
- One hundred Lamps for the Soul (2003)
- If God is My Father How Can He Love Me?
- One Hundred Ways to Serenity (1998)
- One Hundred Ways to Be Happy (1999)
- One Hundred Ways to say I love You (1999)
- One Hundred Ways to Friendship (2000)
- One Hundred Ways to Comfort (2000)
- One Hundred Ways to Say Thank You (2000)
- One Hundred Ways to a Happy Cat (2000)
- One Hundred Ways for a Cat to Train Its Human (2001)
- One Hundred Ways for a Cat to Find its Inner Kitten (2002)
- One Hundred Secret Thoughts Cats have about Their Humans (2003)
- The First Ever English Olimpick Games (2004)
- Chats with Cats (2004)
- One Hundred Ways to a Happy Dog (2006)
- One Hundred Ways to a Happy Bunny (2007)
- The Joy of Cats (2008)
- Cats Behaving Badly (2010)
- Tilly the Ugliest Cat in the Shelter (2012)
- Toby the Cross Eyed Stray (2015)
- 100 Ways to be More Like Your Cat (2018)
- '100 Ways to be as Happy as Your Dog (2018)
- 'A-Z. A Cat's Guide to Humans.' (2019)
- 'Being Your Cat. (2023)
