= Bobrek concentration camp =

Subcamp of the Monowitz concentration camp

Coordinates: 50.06°N 19.26°E

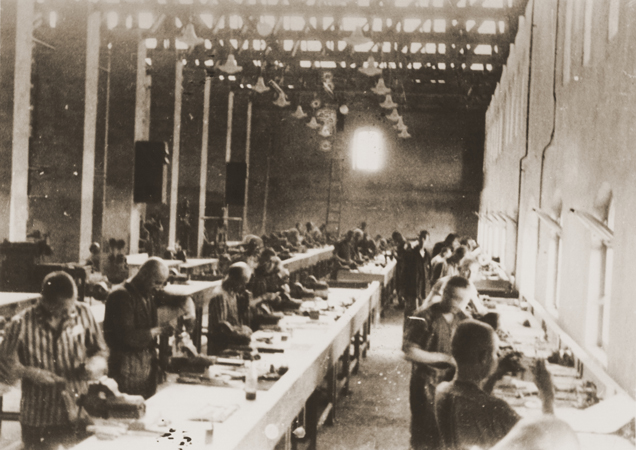
Prisoners producing aircraft and submarine parts in the Siemens-Schuckert factory at Bobrek.

Bobrek was a subcamp of Monowitz concentration camp located in or near Bobrek, Lesser Poland Voivodeship, Poland, and was part of the Auschwitz concentration camp complex. It was built by Siemens-Schuckert and held approximately 250-300 prisoners who were used as slave labor to produce electrical parts for aircraft and U-boat submarines. The commandant of the camp was SS-Scharführer Hermann Buch.

== Evacuation ==
Bobrek subcamp was evacuated along with the other camps in the Auschwitz complex on January 18, 1945. The prisoners were sent on a death march to a concentration camp in Gleiwitz, Poland. Many were then transported by rail to Buchenwald concentration camp. While in Buchenwald, the former Bobrek workers were sought out by Siemens-Schuckert executives, who had them transported to the Siemens-Schuckert factory in Siemensstadt, a suburb of Berlin.

== See also ==
- List of subcamps of Auschwitz
