= Ronald Payne =

British journalist and war correspondent

- Born: Ronald Staveley Payne; 6 February 1926; Ripon, U.K.
- Died: 25 May 2013 (aged 87); Witney, Oxfordshire, U.K.
- Education: Bedford School
- Alma mater: Jesus College, Oxford
- Occupations: Journalist, author
- Spouse: 3, including Celia Haddon

Ronald Staveley Payne (6 February 1926 – 25 May 2013), or Ronnie Payne, was a British journalist and war correspondent who focused on espionage and terrorism.

== Early life ==
Ronald Payne was born on 6 February 1926 in Ripon, Yorkshire, England. His father was a Primitive Methodist minister.

Payne was educated at Pocklington Grammar School and Bedford School. During World War II, he served in the Royal Marines. He subsequently attended Jesus College, Oxford.

== Career ==
Payne began his career as a journalist at the Reading Mercury. He subsequently wrote for the London Evening Standard. In 1953, he joined the Daily Telegraph, first as a reporter and later as a foreign correspondent in Paris. He wrote about French Algeria and French Indochina. He also wrote about the Suez Crisis in 1956, and he interviewed Muammar Gaddafi in 1976.

Payne co-authored several books with Christopher Dobson and John Miller. He was also the author of six non-fiction books about espionage or terrorism.

== Personal life and death ==
Payne was married three times. His third wife, Celia Haddon, was a journalist. They retired in Witney, Oxfordshire.

Payne died on 25 May 2013 in Witney.

== Works ==
- Payne, Ronald (1967). Private Spies. London: A. Barker. OCLC 2093100.
- Dobson, Christopher; Miller, John; Payne, Ronald (1976). The Cruelest Night. Boston: Little, Brown and Company. OCLC 6011500.
- Dobson, Christopher; Payne, Ronald (1977). The Carlos Complex: A Study in Terror. New York: Putnam. ISBN 9780399119033. OCLC 2998366.
- Dobson, Christopher; Payne, Ronald (1979). The Weapons of Terror: International Terrorism at Work. London: Macmillan. ISBN 9780333238738. OCLC 5350714.
- Dobson, Christopher; Payne, Ronald (1982). The Terrorists: Their Weapons, Leaders, and Tactics. New York: Facts on File. ISBN 9780871966681. OCLC 8171688.
- Dobson, Christopher; Payne, Ronald (1982). Counterattack: The West's Battle Against the Terrorists. New York: Facts on File. ISBN 9780871965264. OCLC 8220437.
- Dobson, Christopher; Miller, John; Payne, Ronald (1982). The Falklands Conflict. Falmouth, Cornwall: Coronet Books. ISBN 9780340324080. OCLC 9465217.
- Dobson, Christopher; Payne, Ronald (1984). The Dictionary of Espionage. London: Harrap. ISBN 9780245542015. OCLC 12806141.
- Dobson, Christopher; Payne, Ronald (1984). Who's Who in Espionage. New York: St. Martin's Press. ISBN 9780312874322. OCLC 11650631.
- Dobson, Christopher; Payne, Ronald (1986). War Without End: The Terrorists: An Intelligence Dossier. London: Harrap. ISBN 9780245543548. OCLC 14288751.
- Dobson, Christopher; Payne, Ronald (1987). The Never-Ending War: Terrorism in the 80's. New York: Facts on File Publications. ISBN 9780816020560. OCLC 14357208.
- Payne, Ronald (1990). Mossad : Israel's Most Secret Service. London: Bantam. ISBN 9780593014431. OCLC 21411503.
