= Vinzenz Schöttl =

German SS officer (1905–1946)

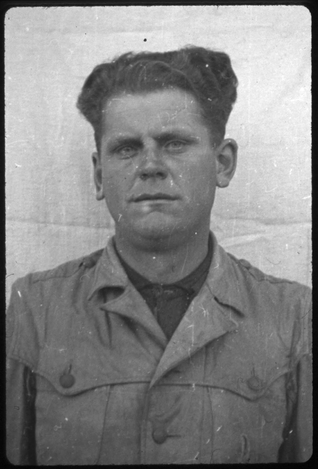
Vinzenz Schöttl in U.S. custody (1945)

Vinzenz Schöttl (30 June 1905 in Appersdorf – 28 May 1946 in Landsberg am Lech) was a German Schutzstaffel (SS) officer and high-ranking functionary in the Nazi concentration camps.

Schöttl initially joined the Nazi Party in November 1928 before renewing his membership in February 1931, having joined the SS in January 1931. His highest SS rank was Obersturmführer in the Waffen-SS Reserve, a position he gained in 1942.

In 1933, he was a member of the guards at Dachau concentration camp. In the summer of 1937, he became the National Director of the Lindenhofs der Herzogsägmühle, a facility for travellers. From 1940 he worked for a short time in the Lublin Ghetto from where he was transferred to Neuengamme concentration camp, and soon afterwards to Majdanek concentration camp. From July 1942 until its evacuation in January 1945 Schöttl was Director of Monowitz concentration camp, otherwise known as Auschwitz concentration camp III. From 3 February 1945 he served under Otto Förschner as deputy commander of Kaufering concentration camp, a subsidiary network of the larger Dachau camp, remaining in that role until the camp's evacuation in late April of the same year.

Schöttl was captured by the United States Army and on 15 November was indicted for war crimes as part of the Dachau Trials. Reports of his mistreatment of prisoners, as well as the shooting of another prisoner, were taken into account and, on 13 December 1945, he was one of 36 defendants sentenced to death by hanging. His execution was carried out in Landsberg Prison on 28 May 1946.
