= Chełmek =

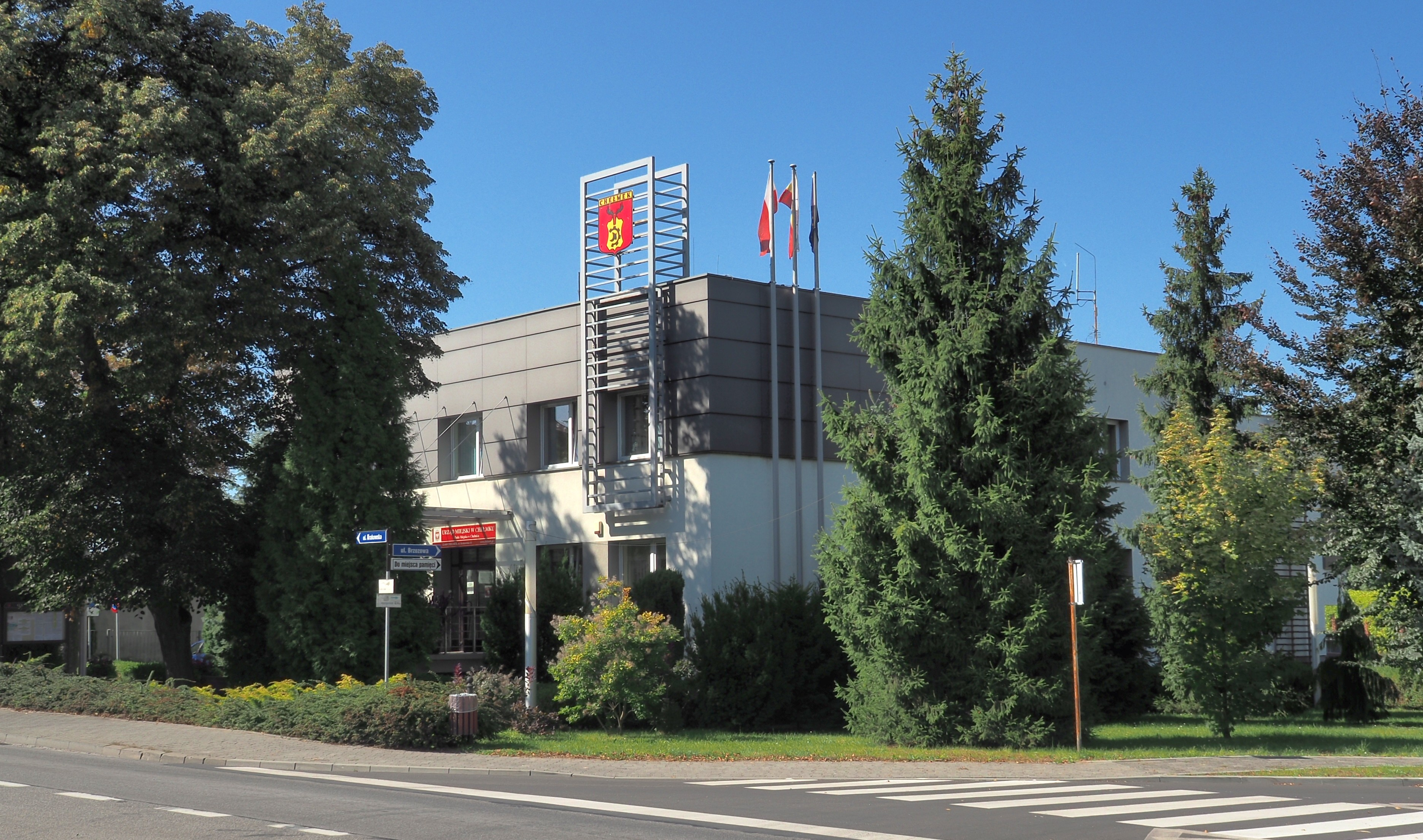
- Town hall

- Coat of arms

- Location within Poland
- Coordinates: 50°7′N 19°15′E
- Country: Poland
- Voivodeship: Lesser Poland
- County: Oświęcim
- Gmina: Chełmek
- Town rights: 1969

Government
  - Mayor: Andrzej Saternus

Area
  - Total: 8.31 km^{2} (3.21 sq mi)

Population (31 December 2021)
  - Total: 8,810
  - Density: 1,060/km^{2} (2,750/sq mi)
- Time zone: UTC+1 (CET)
  - Summer (DST): UTC+2 (CEST)
- Postal code: 32–660
- Car plates: KOS
- Website: chelmek.pl

Chełmek [ˈxɛu̯mɛk] is a town in Lesser Poland Voivodeship in southern Poland. As of December 2021, it has 8,810 inhabitants. Previously known for the Chełmek Shoe Factory, which until 1947 was part of Bata Shoes.

Chełmek lies in the wetland area along the Przemsza river, at the foot of the Skała hill (293 meters above sea level). The town is surrounded by forests.

== History ==
Chełmek was first mentioned in 1414. In 1490, it belonged to a parish from Jaworzno, and until the First Partition of Poland in 1772, it was a small village, which was administratively located in the Kraków Voivodeship in the Lesser Poland Province of the Kingdom of Poland.

In the First Partition of Poland in 1772 Chełmek was annexed by the Habsburg Empire, and made part of Galicia. The village was located right on the border between Prussian Silesia, and Austrian Galicia. It was regained by Poles as a result of the Austro-Polish War in 1809 and became part of the short-lived Polish Duchy of Warsaw, and after its dissolution in 1815, it became part of Chrzanów District of the Free City of Kraków. In November 1846, the Free City was annexed by Austria, and in 1856, rail line from Kraków to Vienna, via Chełmek was constructed. In the late 19th century, it had a population of 1,094. After World War I, in 1918, Poland regained independence, and in the Second Polish Republic, Chełmek belonged to the Kraków Voivodeship, and due to proximity of the Silesian border, its residents helped Polish insurgents in Silesia (see Silesian Uprisings).

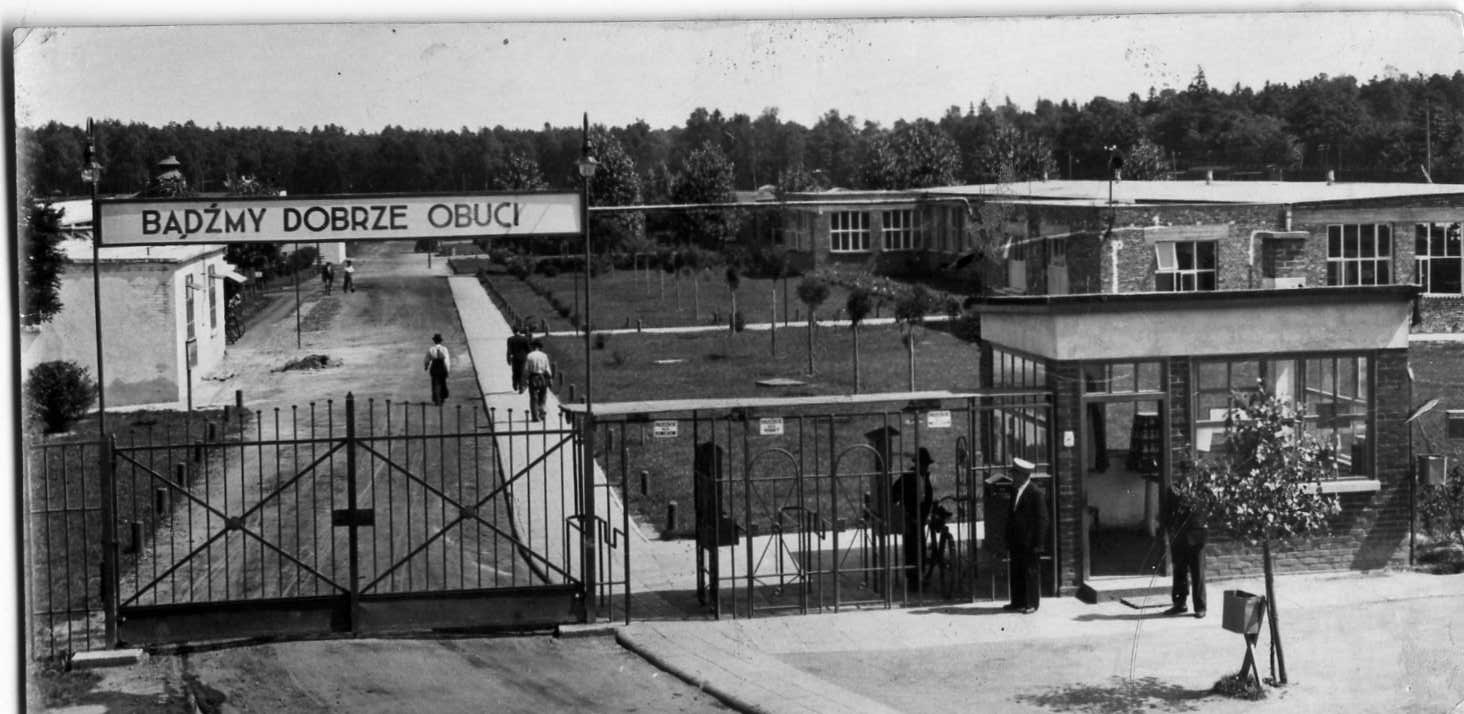
Bata Shoes factory in Chełmek in the 1930s

Until 1931, Chełmek remained a poor village, whose inhabitants would emigrate from it, seeking for work at local coal mines. In 1931, however, legendary Czech businessman Tomas Bata decided to acquire land in Chełmek, to build a shoe factory here, together with a settlement for workers. In five years, the population of the village doubled, a new church, kindergarten, schools and culture house were built.

Following the joint German-Soviet invasion of Poland, which started World War II in 1939, Chełmek was invaded and then occupied by Germany until 1945. In 1942, the Germans established and operated a subcamp of the Auschwitz concentration camp in the settlement. About 150 prisoners, mostly Jews deported from France, Belgium, and the Netherlands, were subjected to slave labour in the subcamp. 47 prisoners died in the subcamp. The Germans left the village on 25 January 1945, and soon after the war, the school and the 1920s iron bridge over the Przemsza were rebuilt.

In 1947, the Bata Shoe Factory was nationalized, and in 1969 Chełmek received town charter. In 1975–1998 it administratively belonged to Bielsko-Biała Voivodeship.

== Demographics ==
Historical population

Year	Pop.	±%
1995	9,307	—
2000	9,215	−1.0%
2005	9,091	−1.3%
2010	9,246	+1.7%

Year	Pop.	±%
2015	9,170	−0.8%
2020	8,912	−2.8%
2021	8,810	−1.1%

== Sports ==
The local football club is KS Chełmek. It competes in the lower leagues.
