= The Investigation (play) =

1965 play by Peter Weiss

The Investigation: Oratorio in 11 Cantos
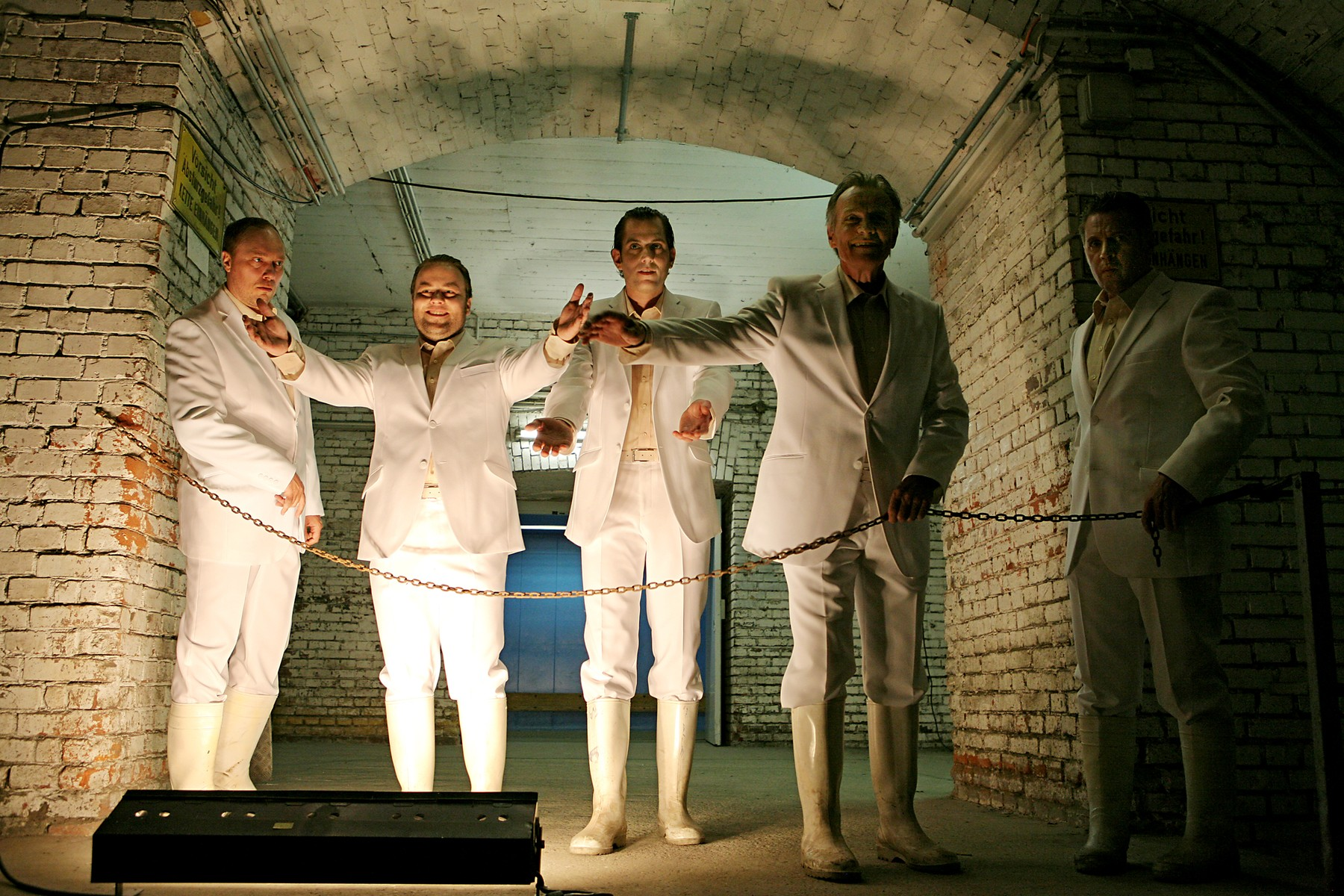
- The Investigation at Staatstheater Nürnberg (2009). Photo by Marion Bührle
- Original language: German
- Written by: Peter Weiss
- Characters: Judge; Prosecuting Attorney; Counsel for the Defense; Witnesses, numbered 1–9; Adjutant Mulka; Boger; Dr. Capesius; Dr. Frank; Dr. Schatz; Dr. Lucas; Kaduk; Hofmann; Medical Orderly Klehr; Scherpe; Hantl; SS Corporal Stark; Baretzki; Schlage; Bischoff; Broad; Breitwieser; Bednarek
- Subject: Frankfurt Auschwitz Trials (1963–65)
- Setting: Courtroom

Premiere
- Date: October 19, 1965
- Place: Simultaneously at 15 theatres (full-scale theatre productions: West Berlin, Cologne, Essen, Munich, Rostock, play readings: East Berlin, Cottbus, Dresden, Gera, Leuna, London, Meiningen, Neustrelitz, Potsdam and Weimar)

The Investigation (1965) is a play by German playwright Peter Weiss that depicts the Frankfurt Auschwitz Trials of 1963–1965. It carries the subtitle "Oratorio in 11 Cantos". Weiss was an observer at the trials and developed the play partially from the reports of Bernd Naumann. The work premiered on October 19, 1965 on stages in fourteen West and East German cities and at the Royal Shakespeare Company in London. In 1966 the production was presented at the Royal Dramatic Theatre in Stockholm which featured sets and costumes designed by Weiss's wife, Gunilla Palmstierna-Weiss, and was directed by Ingmar Bergman.

== World-Theater Project ==
The Investigation was originally supposed to be part of a larger "World-Theater Project", which was to follow the structure of Dante Alighieri's Divine Comedy. The three-part theater project was supposed to include the three realms of Paradise, Hell, and Purgatory. In an inversion of Dante's beliefs, The Investigation was supposed to correspond to the "Paradise" and yet be a place of despair for its victims. Inferno, written in 1964 but first published in 2003 as part of Weiss' estate, described the netherworld in its title. Due to the historical significance of the Auschwitz Trial, the Divine Comedy project was shelved. Weiss published the first third separately as The Investigation.

== Content and structure ==
The play takes place in a courtroom during the Frankfurt Auschwitz trials (1963–1965). Weiss did not intend a literal reconstruction of the courtroom nor representation of the camp itself. Auschwitz is present only in the words of the perpetrators, the victims, and the personnel of the court.

The Investigation is divided into eleven Dantean "cantos," each of which is subdivided into three parts. This 33-part structure mimics Dante's Divine Comedy. Weiss's cantos depict the 'progress' of the victims from the ramp upon arrival at Auschwitz to the gas chambers and the ovens, revealing ever more horrendous moments in the perpetration of the Nazi genocide. Weiss refrains from all dramatic embellishments. The focus is entirely on the spoken word, often taken verbatim from the trial. Weiss's seemingly minimalist intervention in the protocols shows the dramatist (and former painter and filmmaker) who only a year earlier had created the sensational and wildly theatrical play Marat/Sade at the height of his art. The Investigation succeeds in transforming the actual protocols into a work of literature and art – to the extent that art may be best suited to convey a sense of the experience and preserve the memory of the Holocaust.

In the cantos, the dramatist sets the statements of the anonymous witnesses against the named defendants and former SS concentration camp guards. Unlike at the historical trial, only eighteen defendants stand before the court. The statements of several hundred witnesses at the actual trials are condensed in the play in the Witnesses 1–9. Two of the witnesses worked at the camp but side with the defendants, the others, including two women, are victims who through an unlikely series of coincidences (as they repeatedly emphasize) survived the camp. By anonymizing the witnesses/victims, the play reproduces the fact that they were just numbers robbed of their identities, as well as their lives.

The victims' testimonies are numbing in their endlessly detailed inventory of the atrocities committed at the concentration camp. The perpetrators counter with derisive denials and clichéd rejections of their individual responsibilities. This goes to the core question of how much room for individual action and responsibility is available even under the most constricted of circumstances. The play ends before the verdicts are announced, an ending which rejects the notion that there could be any punishment commensurate with genocidal crime or which might bring closure to the victims.

== Linguistic style and rhetoric of exoneration ==
Peter Weiss (1916–1982) was born in Germany but in 1934 went with his family into exile and lived for all of his adult life in Sweden where he also became a citizen. The Investigation, like most of his work, was written in German. It consists of clear, straightforward sentence structures, a strict parataxical style and has no punctuation at all. The past is recapitulated factually and soberly, without emotion. The alienation effect is used to achieve an intensified dramatic effect on the viewer. The rhythm of the utterances of the figures works towards the same goal. As part of the goal of universalization, the word "Jew" is not used in the entire play.

The defendants use a number of strategies to exonerate themselves by minimizing, denying, or justifying their actions:

- discrediting the witnesses or prosecutors
- presenting a self-image as a victim
- relying on the former legal and value system and the superior orders defense, the general acceptance and similar actions of others
- denial of guilt and downplaying of their own roles
- evasive answers, claiming lack of knowledge
- evidence of "successful rehabilitation" since 1945
- pleading the statute of limitations

Few of the defendants acknowledge their guilt. Witnesses 1 and 2 are primarily apologetic. Weiss uses this to illustrate the complex of "second guilt", a concept which Ralph Giordano brought up in his book The Second Guilt and the Burden of Being German. Giordano argued that in their failure to acknowledge and address the collective crimes of the Nazi era, contemporaries of the Third Reich after 1945 brought upon themselves a "second guilt", distinct from the guilt associated with the crimes themselves.

== Reception and criticism ==
With twelve productions altogether, The Investigation was the most played contemporary piece in West Germany during the 1965/1966 season. Nevertheless, the script, which had been published in its entirety in the two months prior to the debut, among other places in the theater magazine "Theater heute," attracted multiple attacks. Theater critic Joachim Kaiser criticized the play for robbing the audience of its freedom of interpretation. The legitimacy of the aesthetic technique chosen by Weiss was debated in the press, on the radio, and in three panel debates in October and November 1965 in Stuttgart, Munich, and East Berlin.

In the debate about a suitable staging concept, two productions in the multiple-stage debut stand out. Erwin Piscator's West Berlin staging at the Freie Volksbühne Berlin used an identification approach where the witness box represented an extension of the auditorium. Piscator let the audience look out at the trial and the defendants from the perspective of the survivors. Peter Palitzsch's production at the Staatstheater Stuttgart pursued an anti-identification conception with regular role-switching by all the actors. The roles of the perpetrators and the victims were thereby depicted as basically the same. From 1965 to 1967 theaters in Amsterdam, Moscow, New York, Prague, Stockholm, and Warsaw added the play to their schedules.

The international productions of The Investigation display a great conceptual diversity, ranging from a representational play to scene reading to concert performances of the oratorios. After a twelve-year break, the play was brought back in 1979 in a provocative comedy-style production authorized by Weiss in the Moers Castle Theater directed by Thomas Schulte-Michels. In 1998, conceptual artist Jochen Gerz staged the play interactively with 500 players on three Berlin stages. The Democratic Republic of Congo-based theater group Urwintore, which is made up of survivors of the 1994 Rwanda genocide, have put on the play in several cities across Africa, Europe, and the United States. Cesear's Forum, Cleveland's small minimalist theatre at Kennedy's Down Under, Playhouse Square, Ohio, presented the play in October and November 2015 as part of the city's Violins of Hope season. The production also marked the 70th anniversary of the liberation of Auschwitz and the war crimes trial of Oskar Groening, "the accountant of Auschwitz". The continued relevance of Weiss' play, linked to the geopolitics of Syria and ISIS, was furthered on the closing weekend of the production by the November 2015 Paris attacks.

In the 1980s, several works which became part of the emerging discourse on the ethics and aesthetics of the representation of the Holocaust in literature denounced The Investigation. The attacks by these critics on the play and its author – even Weiss's Jewish identity was drawn into question (he was the son of a Jewish father and a Christian mother) – are startling. According to the critics, Weiss's play was a distortion and exploitation of the Holocaust for ideological reasons, a judgement which seems to reflect the Cold War (Weiss was a member of the Swedish eurocommunist party VPK); it was artless, lifeless and mechanical, and most disturbingly, in the view of these critics, it was not even about the Jews. The latter assertion was based on the fact that the words 'Jew' and 'Auschwitz' are never mentioned (and neither is the word 'German'), though the play leaves no doubt about any of this. The 1990s produced a number of refutations of these attacks. The Investigation remains a seminal work in the open-ended process of trying to understand the Holocaust.
