= Maximilian Grabner =

Austrian Gestapo chief in Auschwitz (1905–1948)

- SS-Untersturmführer Maximilian Grabner

Head of the Political Department in Auschwitz

Personal details
- Born: 2 October 1905 Vienna, Austria-Hungary
- Died: 24 January 1948 (aged 42) Montelupich Prison, Kraków, Polish People's Republic
- Cause of death: Execution by hanging
- Party: National Socialist German Workers' Party (NSDAP)

Military service
- Rank: Untersturmführer

Maximilian Grabner (2 October 1905 – 24 January 1948) was an Austrian Gestapo chief in Auschwitz. At Auschwitz he was in command of the torture chamber Block 11, where he gained a reputation of brutality. He was executed for crimes against humanity in 1948.

== Early life ==
Born in Vienna, Grabner joined the Austrian police force in 1930 and became a member of the Nazi Party in 1933. After the Anschluß of Austria in 1938, he joined the SS and became a member of the Gestapo. He arrived at Katowice at the outbreak of World War II. He was transferred to Auschwitz concentration camp less than one year later where he became Chief of the Politische Abteilung ("Political Department").

== Career at Auschwitz ==
As Gestapo chief, Grabner was responsible, among other things, for the fight against the resistance movement in the camp, as well as for the prevention of escapes and all contact with the outside world. These tasks were carried out with horrendous cruelties against the prisoners and a large number of incarcerations in the bunker in Block 11. Grabner's staff members, such as Wilhelm Boger, who was only brought to justice in the early 1960s, carried out so-called sharpened interrogations, during which the victims were systematically tortured.

Grabner, together with the commander of the Schutzhaftlager, initiated, on a regular basis, clearings of the bunker: the inmates were examined and many of them were sent directly to the inner courtyard between Block 10 and Block 11, where they were shot. He once ordered SS-Untersturmführer Hans Stark to drop Zyklon B into a gas chamber. Along with Stark, Grabner personally took part in the shooting of Russian Commissars.

== Trial and conviction ==
In 1943, Grabner was arrested for theft, graft and corruption and was put on trial in Weimar a year later. He was found guilty and sentenced to 12 years in prison. After the trial, he returned to Katowice. It is not known if he served any time in prison. Grabner was then arrested by the Allies in 1945 and turned over to Poland in 1947. In the Auschwitz Trial he was found guilty of crimes against humanity and sentenced to death. Grabner was hanged on 24 January 1948.

== Bibliography ==
- Ernst Klee: Das Personenlexikon zum Dritten Reich: Wer war was vor und nach 1945. Fischer-Taschenbuch-Verlag, Frankfurt am Main 2005; ISBN 3-596-16048-0
- Hermann Langbein: Menschen in Auschwitz. Frankfurt am Main, Berlin Wien, Ullstein-Verlag, 1980; ISBN 3-548-33014-2
- Staatliches Museum Auschwitz-Birkenau (Hrsg.): Auschwitz in den Augen der SS. Oswiecim 1998; ISBN 83-85047-35-2
- Wacław Długoborski, Franciszek Piper (Hrsg.): Auschwitz 1940–1945. Studien zur Geschichte des Konzentrations- und Vernichtungslagers Auschwitz, Verlag Staatliches Museum Auschwitz-Birkenau, Oswiecim 1999, 5 Bände: I. Aufbau und Struktur des Lagers. II. Die Häftlinge - Existentzbedingungen, Arbeit und Tod. III. Vernichtung. IV. Widerstand. V. Epilog; ISBN 83-85047-76-X.
- Staatliches Museum Auschwitz-Birkenau (Hrsg): Auschwitz in den Augen der SS. Oswiecim 1998; ISBN 83-85047-35-2.
- Laurence Rees: Auschwitz - the Nazis and the 'Final Solution' London: BBC Books,(2005); ISBN 0-563-52117-1.
