= Frankfurt Auschwitz trials =

Series of trials in Germany

Coordinates: 50.1042°N 8.6411°E

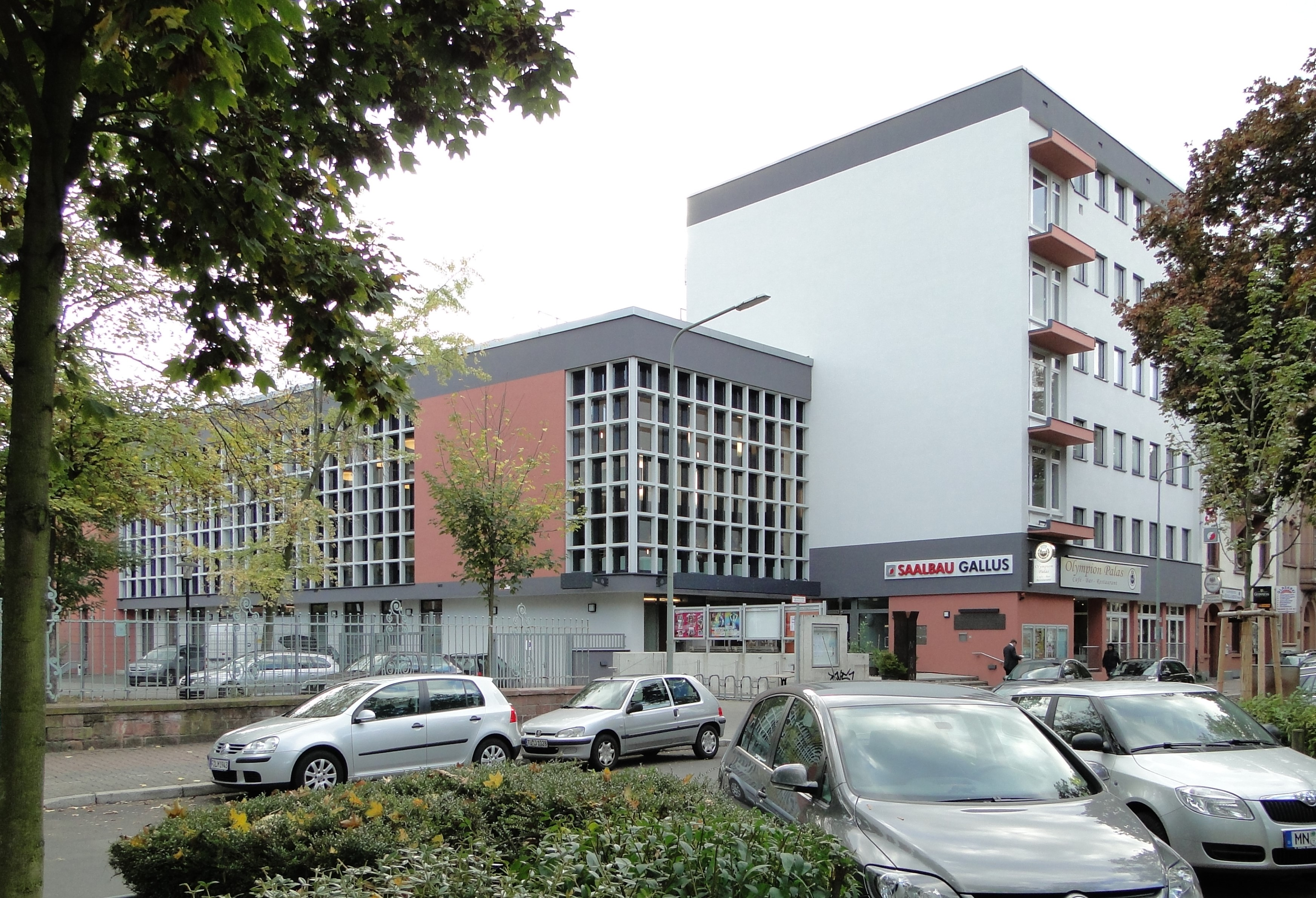
- Bürgerhaus at Frankenallee in Frankfurt am Main-Gallus in 2009, the courthouse for the first Frankfurt Auschwitz trial in 1963–65.
- Court: Frankfurt, West Germany
- Full case name: Second Auschwitz trial (der zweite Auschwitz-Prozess)
- Indictment: 20 December 1963
- Decided: 19 August 1965

Case history
- Subsequent action: Verdict in the last Auschwitz/Lagischa case: September 1977

The Frankfurt Auschwitz trials, or the second Auschwitz trial, known in German as Auschwitzprozesse, was a series of three trials running from 20 December 1963 to 14 June 1968, charging 25 defendants under German criminal law for their roles in the Holocaust as mid- to lower-level officials in the Auschwitz-Birkenau death and concentration camp complex. Hans Hofmeyer led the "criminal case against Mulka and others" (reference number 4 Ks 3/63) as chief judge.

Overall, only 789 individuals of the approximately 8,200 surviving SS personnel who served at Auschwitz and its sub-camps were ever tried, of whom 750 received sentences. Unlike the first Auschwitz trial held almost two decades earlier in Poland, the trials in Frankfurt were not based on the legal definition of crimes against humanity as recognized by international law, but according to the state laws of the Federal Republic.

== Prior trial in Poland ==
Most of the senior leaders of the camp, including Rudolf Höss, the longest-standing commandant of the camp, were turned over to the Polish authorities in 1947 following their participation as witnesses in the Nuremberg trial. Subsequently, the accused were tried in Kraków and many sentenced to death for violent crimes and torturing of prisoners. Only SS-Untersturmführer Hans Münch was set free, having been acquitted of war crimes. That original trial in Poland is usually known as the first Auschwitz trial.

== Course of proceedings ==
SS-Sturmbannführer Richard Baer, the last camp commandant, died in detention while still under investigation as part of the trials. Defendants ranged from members of the SS to kapos, privileged prisoners responsible for low-level control of camp internees, and included some of those responsible for the process of "selection," or determination of who should be sent to the gas chambers directly from the "ramp" upon disembarking the trains that brought them from across Europe ("selection" generally entailed inclusion of all children held to be ineligible for work, generally under the age of 14, and any mothers unwilling to part with their "selected" children). In the course of the trial, approximately 360 witnesses were called, including around 210 survivors. Proceedings began in the Bürgerhaus Gallus, in Frankfurt am Main, which was converted into a courthouse for that purpose, and remained there until their conclusion.

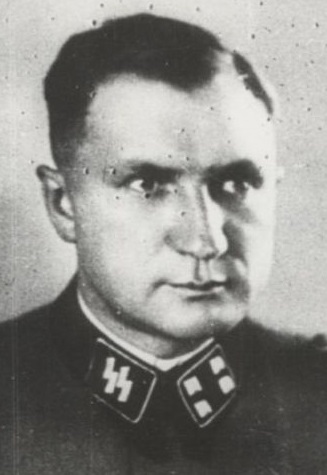
Richard Baer, camp commandant at Dora-Mittelbau

Hessian State Attorney General (Generalstaatsanwalt) Fritz Bauer, himself briefly interned in 1933 at the Heuberg concentration camp, led the prosecution. Bauer was concerned with pursuing individual defendants serving at Auschwitz-Birkenau; only 22 SS members were charged of an estimated 6,000 to 8,000 thought to have been involved in the administration and operation of the camp. The men on trial in Frankfurt were tried only for murders and other crimes that they committed on their own initiative at Auschwitz and were not tried for genocidal actions perpetrated "when following orders", considered by the courts to be the lesser crime of accomplice to murder.

At a 1963 trial, KGB assassin Bohdan Stashynsky, who had committed several murders in the Federal Republic in the 1950s, was found by a German court not legally guilty of murder. Instead, Stashynsky was found to be only an accomplice to murder as the courts ruled that the responsibility for his murders rested only with his superiors in the KGB who had given him his orders.

The legal implication of the Stashynsky case was that the courts had ruled that in a totalitarian system only executive decision-makers could be convicted of murder and that anyone who followed orders and killed someone could be convicted only of being accomplices to murder. The term executive decision-maker was thus defined by the courts to apply only to the highest levels of the Reich leadership during the National Socialist period, and that all who just followed orders when killing were just accomplices to murder. Someone could be only convicted of murder if it was shown that they had killed someone on their own initiative, and thus all of the accused of murder at the Auschwitz trial were tried only for murders that they had done on their own initiative.

Thus, Bauer could only indict for murder those who killed when not following orders, and those who had killed while following orders could be indicted as accomplices to murder. Moreover, because of the legal distinction between murderers and accomplices to murder, this meant that an SS man who killed thousands while operating the gas chambers at Auschwitz could only be found guilty of being accomplice to murder because he had been following orders, while an SS man who had beaten one inmate to death on his own initiative could be convicted of murder because he had not been following orders.

Bauer is said to have been opposed in the former purpose by the young Helmut Kohl, then a junior member of the Christian Democratic Union. In furtherance of that purpose Bauer sought and received support from the Institute for Contemporary History in Munich. The historians from the institute that served as expert witnesses for the prosecution were Helmut Krausnick, Hans-Adolf Jacobsen, Hans Buchheim, and Martin Broszat. Subsequently, the information the four historians gathered for the prosecution served as the basis for their 1968 book, Anatomy of the SS State, the first thorough survey of the SS based on SS records.

Information about the actions of those accused and their whereabouts had been in the possession of West German authorities since 1958, but action on their cases was delayed by jurisdictional disputes, among other considerations. The court's proceedings were largely public and served to bring many details of the Holocaust to the attention of the public in the Federal Republic of Germany, as well as abroad. Six defendants were given life sentences and several others received the maximum prison sentences possible for the charges brought against them.

== Documentation ==
The trial comprised 183 days of hearings held from 1963 to 1965. The 430 hours of the testimony of 319 witnesses, including 181 survivors of the Auschwitz concentration camp and 80 members of the camp staff, the SS, and the police were recorded on 103 tapes, and 454 volumes of files that were stored at the Hessian State Archives in Wiesbaden.

In 2017, the original magnetic tapes recording the main proceedings of the Frankfurt Auschwitz trial, which focused the world's attention on the systemic industrialized mass-murder of the Holocaust, were submitted by Germany and included by UNESCO in its Memory of the World International Register.

== Outcomes ==
The trial attracted much publicity in Germany, but was considered by Bauer to be a failure. Bauer complained that the media treated the accused in such a manner as to imply that they were all freakish monsters, which allowed the German public to distance themselves from feeling any moral guilt about what had happened at Auschwitz, which was instead presented as the work of a few sick people who were not at all like normal Germans. Moreover, Bauer felt that because the law treated those who had followed orders when killing as accomplices to murder it implied that the policy of genocide and the Nazi rules for treating inmates at Auschwitz were in fact legitimate.

Bauer wrote that the way that the media had portrayed the trial had supported the,

wishful fantasy that there were only a few people with responsibility ... and the rest were merely terrorized, violated hangers-on, compelled to do things completely contrary to their true nature.

Furthermore, Bauer charged that the judges, in convicting the accused, had made it appear that Germany in the Nazi era had been an occupied country, with most Germans having no choice but to follow orders. He said,

but this ... had nothing to do with historical reality. There were virulent nationalists, imperialists, anti-Semites and Jew-haters. Without them, Hitler was unthinkable.

A public opinion poll conducted after the Frankfurt Auschwitz trials indicated that 57% of the German public were not in favor of additional Nazi trials.

Name	Rank, Title, or Role	Sentence
Stefan Baretzki	Blockführer (block chief)	Life plus 8 years imprisonment
Emil Bednarek	Kapo	Life imprisonment
Wilhelm Boger	Camp Gestapo	Life & 5 years imprisonment
Arthur Breitwieser	Camp uniforms, Häftlingsbekleidungskammer	Released
Perry Broad	Camp Gestapo	4 years imprisonment
Victor Capesius	Pharmacist	9 years imprisonment
Klaus Dylewski	Camp Gestapo	5 years imprisonment
Willi Frank	Head of SS dental station	7 years imprisonment
Emil Hantl	Sanitätsdienstgrad (medical orderly)	3½ years imprisonment
Karl-Friedrich Höcker	Adjutant	7 years imprisonment
Franz-Johann Hofmann	Head of protective custody camp	Life imprisonment
Oswald Kaduk	Rapportführer (SS NCO)	Life imprisonment
Josef Klehr	Medical orderly	Life & 15 years imprisonment
Dr. Franz Lucas	SS Obersturmführer	3 years, 3 months imprisonment
Robert Mulka	Adjutant	14 years imprisonment
Gerhard Neubert	HKB Monovitz	Released
Hans Nierzwicki	HKB Auschwitz 1	Released
Willi Schatz	SS dentist	Acquitted & released
Herbert Scherpe	SS Oberscharführer	4½ years imprisonment
Bruno Schlage	SS Oberscharführer	6 years imprisonment
Johann Schobert	Political Division	Acquitted & released
Hans Stark	Camp Gestapo	10 years imprisonment

== Additional trials ==
From 1965 to 1966, three more SS men who had served at Auschwitz were tried: Wilhelm Burger, Josef Erber, and Gerhard Neubert. All three men were found guilty. Erber was sentenced to life in prison, while Burger and Neubert received 8-year and 3.5-year sentences, respectively. From 1967 to 1968, two Kapos, Bernhard Bonitz and Josef Windeck, were tried. Both men received life sentences.

In September 1977, an additional trial was held in Frankfurt against two former members of the SS, Unterscharführer Horst Czerwinski and Sturmmann Josef Schmidt, for killings in the Auschwitz satellite camp of Lagischa (Polish: Łagisza), and on the so-called "evacuation" (i.e. death march) from Goleszów (Golleschau) to Wodzisław Śląski (Loslau). Proceedings against Czerwinski were stayed after he was found medically unfit for trial. Schmidt was convicted of murdering one inmate in autumn of 1943, when he was considered a minor under German law. In recognition of both this and the fact that he had previously served a prison sentence in Poland he was sentenced to eight years juvenile detention.

Czerwinski was later indicted for a second time in 1985. 204 witnesses testified against him, including Josef Schmidt and Auschwitz survivor Abraham Schaechter. Czerwinski was accused of having brutally murdered at least two inmates who had unsuccessfully attempted to escape. He was convicted in 1989 after a trial lasting four years and sentenced to life imprisonment.

This and the previous trial inspired the one in the film The Reader.. The Frankfurt trial is referenced in Jean-Luc Godard's film A Married Woman of 1964.

== See also ==
- Belzec trial
- Chełmno trials
- Majdanek trials
- Sobibor trial
- Treblinka trials
- Ulm Einsatzkommando trial
- The Investigation – a play by Peter Weiss written in 1965 which depicts the Frankfurt Auschwitz trials.
- Labyrinth of Lies – a 2014 German drama film directed by Giulio Ricciarelli that focuses on the difficulties that prosecutors had to surmount because of systemic suppression of the truth in post-war Germany. The film ends just as the trials begin in 1963.
- The Interpreter of Silence, a 2023 German television limited series about the trials.

== General references ==
- Renz, Werner (April 2002). "40 Jahre Auschwitz-Prozess: Ein unerwünschtes Verfahren" [40 years of Auschwitz trial: An unwanted process] (in German). Frankfurt: Fritz Bauer Institute. Archived from the original on 2 March 2005.
- Part One of World Socialist Web Site coverage
- Part Two of World Socialist Web Site coverage
- Part Three of World Socialist Web Site coverage
- Summary of Sentences from Jewish Virtual Library
- Fritz-Bauer-Institut (Frankfurt) / Staatliches Museum Auschwitz-Birkenau (Hrsg): Der Auschwitz-Prozeß. Tonbandmitschnitte, Protokolle, Dokumente. DVD/ROM. Directmedia Publishing, Berlin 2004, ISBN 3-89853-501-0 (also via D. Czech: Kalendarium)
- Verdict on Auschwitz, The Frankfurt Auschwitz Trial 1963-65 at DEFA Film Library, 2006.
