= Klaus Dylewski =

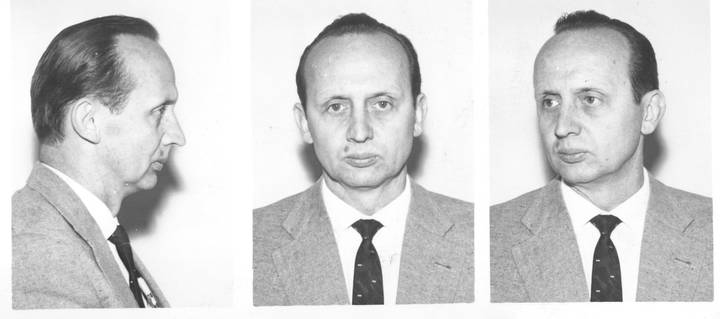
Ex-Staff Sergeant Klaus Dylewski after his arrest in 1959.

Klaus Hubert Hermann Dylewski (born 11 May 1916 – 1 April 2012) was a German Volksdeutscher with Polish citizenship and SS-Oberscharführer (Staff Sergeant) who perpetrated acts of genocide at Auschwitz concentration camp.

== Early life ==
Klaus Dylewski was born in German Empire, Finkenwalde (now Zdroje, Szczecin, Poland), on 11 May 1916. He spent his childhood in Lazisk where he went to German schools. Dylewski identified himself as ethnic German. After he graduated in 1935, he attended a technical course at Danzig Technical School and studied Mechanical Engineering. He did not finish this course, but he joined the 3rd SS Division Totenkopf of the Waffen-SS as a foreign collaborator in 1939. In 1940, he participated in the Invasion of France, in which he was wounded.

== War Crimes ==
In September 1940, he was transferred to Auschwitz and was assigned by the Concentration Camps Inspectorate in the Political Department of Auschwitz. From the day of his assignment until 1944, he participated in shootings, torture, and gassings in the Department. In the spring of 1944, he was promoted to SS Staff Sergeant, and was assigned to Hersbruck, Germany, where he worked as a manager of an aircraft factory. Political prisoners from concentration camps were working as slave laborers at that factory.

== Auschwitz Trials ==
At the end of the war, in May 1945, Dylewski moved to Munich to evade justice and to conceal his real identity. Months later, he moved to Hamburg, and worked there as a laborer. In 1948, he continued his unfinished course in Humboldt University of Berlin, in the German capital under a false identity. After he graduated in 1952, he taught in a technical school in Düsseldorf, but after seven years, in 1959, he was arrested and later revealed his true identity as a former SS officer. He was released the same year for lack of evidence. In 1960–61, he was arrested and incarcerated for nearly four months, and was released again. But in late 1963, he was arrested for the third time prior to the Frankfurt Auschwitz Trials. He was tried and found guilty of "aiding and abetting murder on 32 separate occasions, 2 involving the murder of at least 750 people" and was sentenced to five years imprisonment. Dylewski was released in 1968 by the court, having served only three years in prison. Dylewski died in Hilden on 1 April 2012.
