= Adolf Winkelmann =

Adolf Winkelmann may refer to:

- Adolf Winkelmann (physician) (1887–1947), German physician of the Ravensbrück Nazi concentration camp, see Hamburg Ravensbrück Trials
- Adolf Winkelmann (film director) (born 1946), German film director, producer and screenwriter
