= Hans Hofmeyer =

German lawyer (1904–1992)

Hans Hofmeyer (12 April 1904 – 28 August 1992) was a German jurist. He was in charge of the first Auschwitz trial in Frankfurt am Main.

== Life ==
During the first Auschwitz trial at Frankfurt, Hofmeyer lived in Bad Vilbel. During the trial, he declined even the most innocuous interview, stating that he did not want to disturb the course of the trial.

== Academic studies and career ==
Hofmeyer studied law at Frankfurt am Main, Munich and Gießen. After the trainee lawyers' exam in 1928 and the second state examination in 1931, he worked as an assessor until 1936, first in a lawyers' office in Darmstadt, later at courts in Worms, Darmstadt and Offenbach. In 1936, he became a councillor at a municipal court. During the Second World War, he worked as an intelligence officer until he was named senior staff judge in the National Socialist military jurisdiction in 1944. Starting in 1946, he was the chairman of the criminal division at the District Court of Frankfurt am Main. In 1954, he became the chairman of the civil division of the District Court, where he was in charge of press relations. At the beginning of the 1960s, he returned to the criminal division as a regional court director. During the first Auschwitz trial, he was named president of the senate at the Higher Regional Court at Frankfurt am Main. In Frankfurt, he led some supra-regional trials, among them the lawsuits concerning the book "Der rote Rufmord" (Red Calumny) by Kurt Ziesel and the lawsuits of the former prime minister of Schleswig-Holstein, Kai-Uwe von Hassel, against the newspaper "Frankfurter Rundschau". He gained an international reputation as a judge at the first Frankfurt Auschwitz trial.

== First Frankfurt Auschwitz trial (1963 – 1965) ==
Hofmeyer, as Chief Judge, led the action "criminal case against Mulka and others" (reference number 4 Ks 2/63) which is also known as first Auschwitz trial. The trial was held from December 20, 1963, to August 20, 1965, before the District Court at Frankfurt am Main. Originally, 22 defendants were tried during 183 days before court. The trial became known as the "most important West German lawsuit against National Socialist violent criminals". Primarily, Hans Forester was scheduled to be Chief Judge and Hofmeyer to be his assessor. However, Forester had relatives that had been persecuted in National Socialist Germany. Since conflicts due to probable bias were feared, Forester was excused from the trial in the fall of 1963, and Hans Hofmeyer was made chairman. Hofmeyer's nomination as Chief Judge was a surprise, for in his career until then there were few indications that he might be able to conduct a trial of this dimension, which would, furthermore, be observed internationally. Moreover, he had been a judge himself in National Socialist Germany. But even ideological opponents such as the defence counsel Friedrich Karl Kaul did not find any indications in this to jeopardize the trial. Hofmeyer wanted to prevent the marathon trial the Hessian Attorney General Fritz Bauer had initiated. From his point of view, such fundamental trials were not feasible and marred the rights of the defendants. Rather, he favoured that they should be divided into several small trials specific for the single accused. Even after the successful end of the trial, he argued resolutely against the conducting of such trials. However, he could not make his point against Fritz Bauer. For Bauer, juridical coming to terms with the whole set of facts in the Auschwitz case was the focus. He wanted to investigate as many suspects as possible to elucidate the entirety of offenses in the camp in one or several large trials. With the investigation of the set of crimes, the German public was to be confronted with the National Socialist misdeeds. These differing concepts were voiced again during the reasons for the judgment. At the beginning of the promulgation, Hofmeyer explained: "We are dealing here with a normal criminal trial, may it have such or such a background. The court could only pronounce judgement according to the laws it has evoked. And these laws require, in subjective and objective terms, an exact ascertainment of the precise guilt of an accused". Moreover, the trial was not an Auschwitz trial but a "trial against Mulka and others." The witnesses' testimonies had deeply impressed Hofmeyer. He concluded the reasons for the judgment, visibly moved, with the words: "There may be certainly some among us who cannot look into the joyful and happy eyes of a child for a long time without thinking of the fear-filled, enquiring and believing eyes of those children that went their way in Auschwitz."

== Appraisal ==
Both by the participants at the Auschwitz trial and by the press, Hofmeyer was described as a brilliant jurist and experienced chief negotiator who was a match for all phases of the trial. The lawyer Henry Ormond pointed out the "exemplary conduct of the trial". According to Eugen Kogon, it was the merit of the jury court to resist all snares due to its "superior juridical self-restriction". Herrmann Langbein, prisoner at Auschwitz, witness and observer during the trial, attested the judge: "He conducted the trial expertly and managed to quickly override petty bantering and political propaganda."

The newspaper Die Welt wrote about him: "The chairman in the Auschwitz trial is a down-to-earth man who does not care about intellectual amusements, juridical fireworks. If common sense exists at all, he has it. Often, he asks one or two more questions than somebody else would ask because he cannot believe which is, in fact, unbelievable." The newspaper Sonntagsblatt wrote about Hofmeyer: "This judge, as poorly gifted with rhetorical eloquence as most of his fellows, found the words that displayed him and the court he had led for twenty months, at the end of the trial, once again as representatives of a justice whose image would only be inadequately explained with the symbol of the Blind Goddess."

== Bibliography ==
- Raphael Gross / Werner Renz (Hrsg.), Der Frankfurter Auschwitz-Prozess (1963–1965). Kommentierte Quellenedition. Wissenschaftliche Reihe des Fritz Bauer Instituts, Band 22 (2 Teilbände). Frankfurt am Main 2013.
- Hermann Langbein, Der Auschwitz-Prozeß. Eine Dokumentation. 2 Bände. Frankfurt am Main 1995. Unveränderter Nachdruck der 1965 im Europa-Verlag, Wien, erschienenen Auflage. ISBN 3-8015-0283-X
- Devin O. Pendas, Der Auschwitz-Prozess. Völkermord vor Gericht. München 2013 (= German translation of the American original from 2006).
