= Adolf Winkelmann (physician) =

German physician

Adolf Ludwig Winkelmann (born 26 March 1887 in Salzkotten, died 1 February 1947 in Hamburg) was an SS Hauptsturmführer and was employed as a doctor in several Nazi concentration camps including the Ravensbrück concentration camp.

== Life ==
Winkelmann passed the state examination in 1913 at the University of Kiel, and on 26 September 1914 he received his licence to practise as a doctor. He received his doctorate from Walter Stoeckel, worked at various hospitals and was employed as a doctor in the Imperial German Navy during the First World War. After the war he was in 1918 a member of a volunteer corps, before settling as a practising physician in Lippstadt.

On 1 May 1933 he joined the NSDAP (membership No. 3.101.530), and on 18 June 1933 he joined the Schutzstaffel (SS No. 109.112). Winkelmann was promoted to SS Untersturmführer on 15 September 1935, to SS Obersturmführer on 9 November 1936 and to SS Hauptsturmführer on 30 January 1939. From January to October 1940 he was employed as a regimental doctor with the rank of SS Hauptsturmführer in the 8th SS regiment of the Waffen SS in Kraków.

Until 1 December 1944, he worked as a medical officer in Częstochowa. After brief assignments at the Groß-Rosen and Sachsenhausen concentration camps, he was transferred to the Ravensbrück concentration camp at the end of February 1945.

== Ravensbrück ==
Winkelmann admitted that together with Richard Trommer he had selected prisoners who were unable to work, but the purpose of the selection remained hidden: "I knew that some transports came to the Uckermark concentration camp, but I did not know for what purpose." He had only been there a few times. This was contrasted by the statements of all witnesses who unanimously confirmed his participation in the selections there. During his service in Ravensbrück, he and Trommer "selected around 1,500 to 2,000 prisoners for removal”. Winkelmann described these selections in court:

The searches took place on one of the camp streets or in a barrack, but very rarely. The inmates marched in a row to Dr Trommer and past me. Of course, we could only do a very superficial examination, and the people who were obviously sick, unable to work, or unable to march were searched. The inmates had bare their legs so that we could see if they were capable of walking.

Winkelmann said that he had not known that the selection could mean death for the prisoners. Nor did he know that there was a gas chamber in the camp. He only acted on the orders of Trommer, who told him that there was a choice for evacuating the camp. He was horrified to have participated in such a crime. He had never heard of gassings in Germany until then and had only known about Auschwitz-Birkenau. Since Percival Treite and Franz Lucas were busy with the selection for the gas chamber in Ravensbrück, he was the third doctor responsible for the area.

To relieve him, a witness testified that Winkelmann refused to abort her because she violated his medical ethos. According to his own information, he saw no ill-treatment of prisoners in the area and did not do any.

Winkelmann died on 1 February 1947 of the consequences of a heart attack during the first of the seven Ravensbrück trials in Hamburg. Despite some doubts, the court found him guilty.
