= Block 11 =

Building in Auschwitz I (main camp); central camp torture and execution facility

Coordinates: 50.0251°N 19.2035°E

Block 11 Auschwitz concentration camp
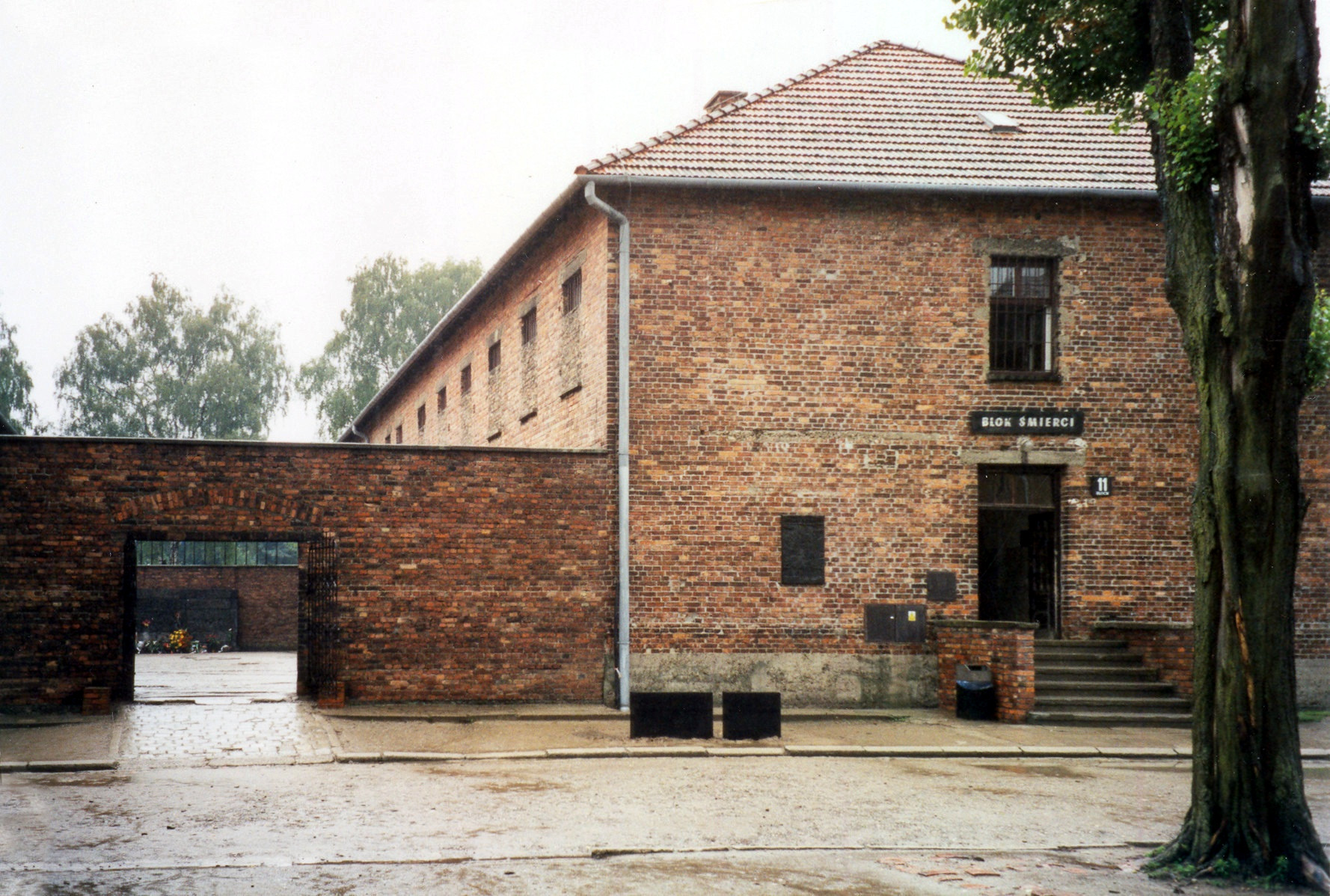
- Block 11, with the "death wall" to the left

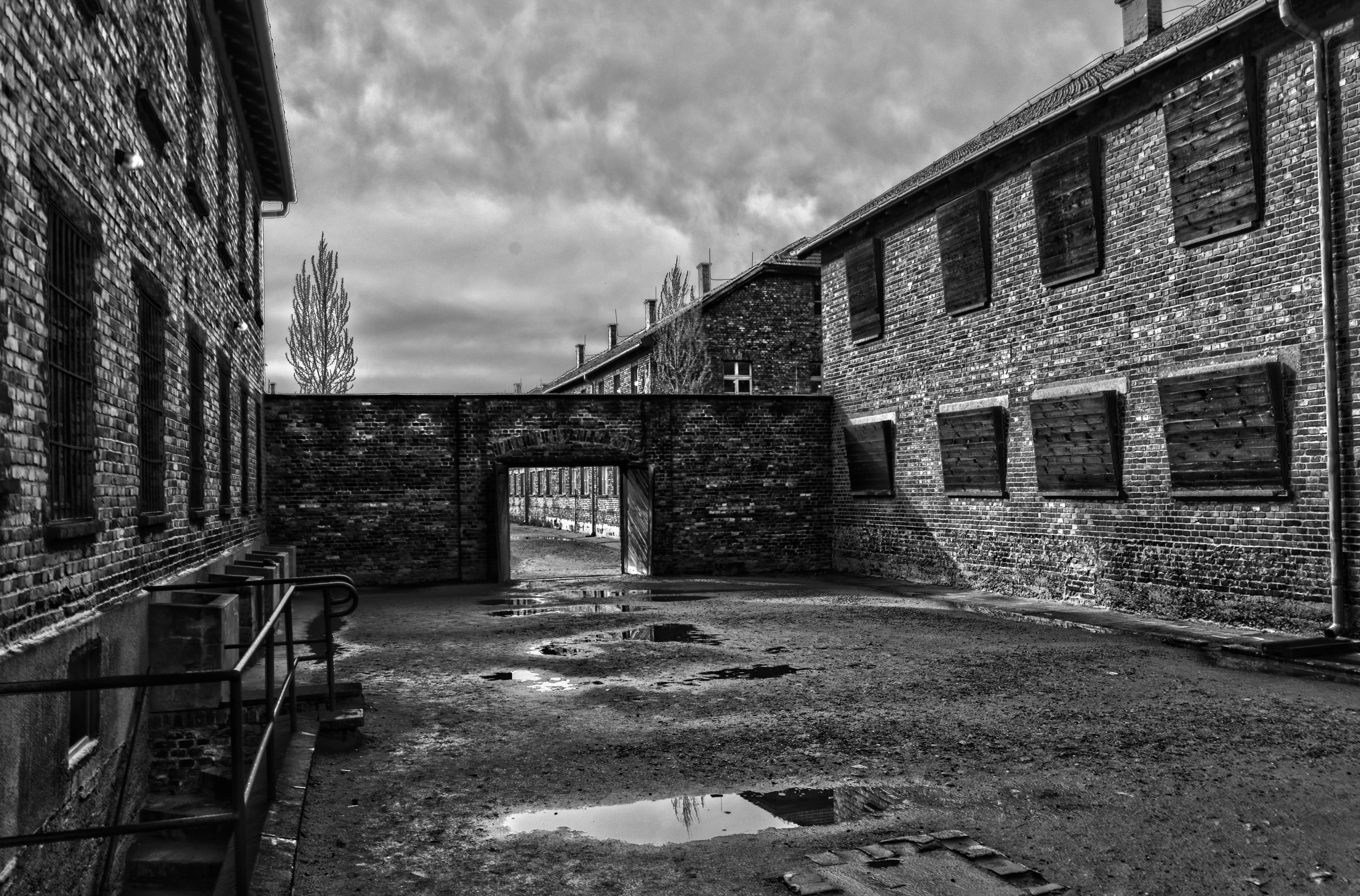
- View of Block 11 (left) as seen from the site of the reconstructed death wall

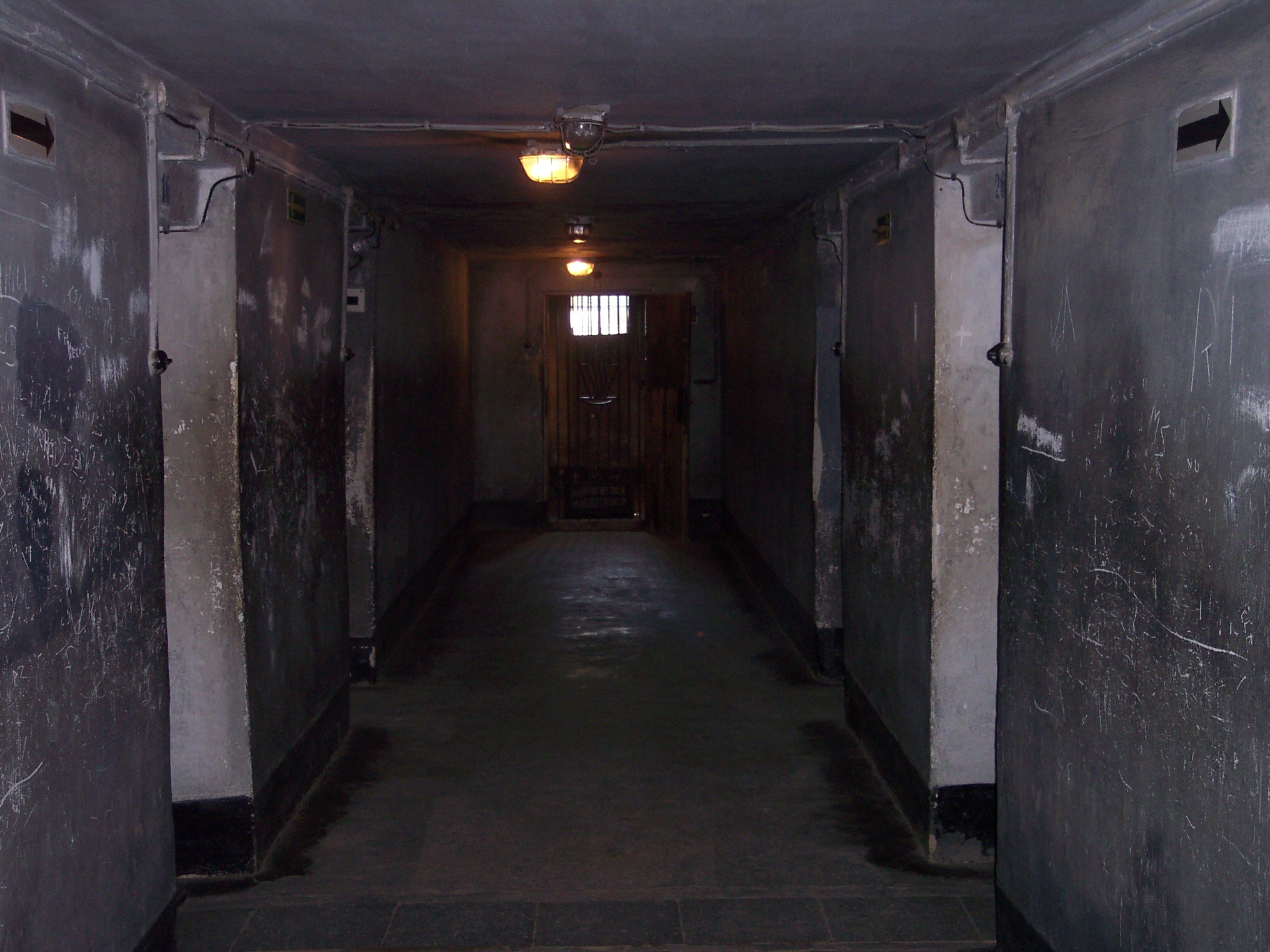
- Corridor of Block 11

Block 11 was the name of a brick building in Auschwitz I, the Stammlager or main camp of the Auschwitz concentration camp network operated by Nazi Germany. This block was used for executions and torture. Between Block 10 and Block 11 stood the "Death Wall" (reconstructed after the war) where thousands of prisoners were lined up for execution by firing squad.

The block contained special torture chambers in which various punishments were applied to prisoners. Some could include being locked in a dark chamber for several days or being forced to stand in one of four standing cells. Punishment in these special compartments, called Stehzelle in German, (one square metre each, with a hole 5 cm × 5 cm for breathing), involved confining four prisoners at once, forced by the lack of space to remain constantly standing for up to twenty nights, while still being forced to work during the day.

It was at Block 11 that the first attempts to kill people with Zyklon B were implemented in September 1941.

== Interrogations ==
Prisoner interrogations involving extreme torture were also conducted within Block 11, often with use of the "Boger Swing" device, (Boger-Schaukel) invented by Wilhelm Boger, an SS officer who served within Auschwitz's Political Department.
