= Pery Broad =

Brazilian non-commissioned officer

- On trial during Frankfurt Auschwitz Trials

Personal details
- Born: 25 April 1921 Rio de Janeiro, Brazil
- Died: 28 November 1993 (aged 72) Düsseldorf, Germany

Military service
- Allegiance: Nazi Germany
- Branch/service: Schutzstaffel
- Rank: SS-Unterscharführer

Pery Broad, also Perry Broad, (25 April 1921 – 28 November 1993) was a Brazilian-born German non-commissioned officer in the Schutzstaffel (SS) active at Auschwitz concentration camp from April 1942 to 1945. He reached the rank of SS-Unterscharführer while working as a translator and stenographer in the camp headquarters. As a prisoner after the war, he wrote a historically valuable account of the camp's operation, dubbed the Broad Report.

Broad, born in Rio de Janeiro in 1921, came to Berlin with his mother at the age of five. He studied at the Technische Hochschule in Charlottenburg (now Technische Universität Berlin) and joined the Waffen-SS in 1941 as a foreigner. Detached on duty to Auschwitz, he requested a transfer to the Politische Abteilung, where he conducted interrogations. According to Simon Laks, head of the prisoner's orchestra, Broad was a music lover who attended most of its performances, an exception being while choosing female prisoners for the camp brothel.

He remained in Auschwitz until the dissolution of the camp in early 1945, and was captured by British armed forces. While a prisoner of war, he voluntarily wrote a report about his experiences in Auschwitz.

Released in 1947, he again was arrested 12 years later, then freed in December 1960 after the payment of DM 50,000 as surety. He was arrested again in November 1964 as a defendant in the Frankfurt Auschwitz Trials, where he was found guilty of supervising selections at Birkenau, as well as participating in interrogations, tortures and executions. For these crimes, he was sentenced to four years in prison in 1965. In 1979 in Wuppertal, Broad was among those interviewed and secretly filmed by Claude Lanzmann for Shoah, his Holocaust documentary released in 1985.

== Published English translations of the Broad Report ==
- Broad, Pery (1965). Smolen, Kazimierz; Bezwińska, Jadwiga; Brandhuber, Jerzy; Czech, Danuta (eds.). KZ Auschwitz: reminiscences of Pery Broad, SS-man in the Auschwitz concentration camp. Translated by Michalik, Krystyna. Oświȩcim, Poland: Auschwitz-Birkenau State Museum. OCLC 799364.
  - republished in KL Auschwitz seen by the SS. Auschwitz-Birkenau State Museum. 1972. pp. 139–198. ISBN 9780865273467 – via Internet Archive.
  - reprinted in the United States by Howard Fertig, ISBN 9780865275041
- Naumann, Bernd (1966). "The Broad Report". Auschwitz: A Report on the Proceedings Against Robert Karl Ludwig Mulka and Others Before the Court at Frankfurt. Translated by Steinberg, Jean. foreword by Hannah Arendt. New York: Frederick A. Praeger. pp. 162–324. OCLC 1448174.
