= Willi Schatz =

SS Concentration Camp Dentist (1905–1985)

Personal details
- Born: 1 February 1905 Hannover, Germany
- Died: 17 February 1985 (aged 80) Hannover, Germany
- Party: National Socialist German Workers' Party (NSDAP) & (SA)
- Occupation: Dentist

Military service
- Allegiance: Nazi Germany
- Branch/service: Schutzstaffel
- Rank: SS-Obersturmführer

Willi Schatz (1 February 1905 – 17 February 1985) was a Nazi SS-Obersturmführer (Lieutenant) as a SS-KZ Zahnarzt (Concentration Camp Dentist) who served in Auschwitz and Neuengamme.

== Early life ==
Schatz was born in 1905, the son of a dentist. He first attended elementary school and then a high school in Hannover from where he graduated. Like his father, he then studied dentistry at the University of Göttingen and received his doctorate in 1933. In 1933 he became a member of the NSDAP and the SA. Because of his facilitation of abortion in 1939 he was excluded from the party until he was called to the Heer on 10 June 1940 as he worked as a dentist in Hanover. On 3 July 1943, he retired from the Army and on 22 July 1943 he became a member of the Waffen-SS.

== World War II ==
In the fall 1943 Schatz graduated from one of the SS-Medizinischen Akademie (Medical Academies) in Graz as a SS-Untersturmführer and was used in the SS-Hauptquartier (Headquarters) in Oranienburg. From 20 January 1944 until the fall of 1944 he became the second in charge by his superior, SS-KZ Zahnarzt Willi Frank at Auschwitz. He was then transferred to Neuengamme where he served until the war's end in the same function. In 1945 he was promoted again to SS-Obersturmführer.

== Post-war ==
At the end of the war he was captured by the British and subsequently released in January 1946. Soon after, he opened a dental practice in Hannover.

== Frankfurt Auschwitz Trials ==
Schatz was arrested in 1959 and stood trial for his crimes in the camps before the Assize Court in Frankfurt am Main which became known as the Frankfurt Auschwitz Trials. He was accused of having selected prisoners at Auschwitz which he denied that he took part of. Since this ultimately could not be proved beyond reasonable doubt, he was acquitted on 20 August 1965.

== Death ==
Schatz died from cancer on 17 February 1985.
