= Hans Stark =

SS Officer (1921–1991)

- Stark in custody of the Frankfurt Police
- Born: 14 June 1921 Darmstadt, Germany
- Died: 29 March 1991 (aged 69) Darmstadt, Germany
- Allegiance: Nazi Germany
- Branch: Schutzstaffel
- Rank: SS-Untersturmführer
- Conflicts: World War II

Hans Stark (14 June 1921 – 29 March 1991) was an SS-Untersturmführer and head of the admissions detail at Auschwitz-II Birkenau of Auschwitz concentration camp.

== Life and SS career ==
Stark attended the Volksschule in Darmstadt from 1927 until 1931. He had a strict upbringing at the hands of his father, who as a police officer, gave his sons a "typically Prussian education". However, Stark failed to live up to his father's academic expectations, and thus it was decided that the young man needed firmer guidance. Stark left the Realgymnasium in 1937 in the seventh year to apply for Reichsarbeitsdienst or Wehrmacht, but both rejected him due to his age. Notwithstanding, Stark joined the 2nd SS Death's Head brigade 'Brandenburg' (II. SS-Totenkopfstandarte "Brandenburg") in December as its youngest recruit with the written permission of his father, as the SS accepted 16 year old applicants.

At 16 and a half years old, Stark was sent to Oranienburg, where he was the youngest recruit of the unit. There, the SS gave him an intensive indoctrination in the Nazi ideology. In January 1938 he was assigned guard duties at a concentration camp, which most likely was Sachsenhausen. After six months of basic training, Stark was granted his first home visit. He was strictly forbidden from disclosing at home what was going on at the camp. His father noticed that he appeared depressed, and for that reason, tried to get him out of the SS. From June 1938 to September 1939, he received further training at Buchenwald and Dachau concentration camps.

=== Auschwitz ===
At the rank of SS-Unterscharführer, he was posted to Auschwitz at the end of 1940 and worked as a Blockführer (Block leader). In 1941 he was brought into the Political Department and became head of the admissions detail.

In his continued efforts to get his son out of the SS, Stark's father was informed that the only way of doing so was to have him apply to continue his education. From Christmas 1941 to March 1942, Stark returned to his home town and took his final exams as an external candidate at the Justus-Liebig-Gymnasium.

Stark admitted to the shooting of prisoners at Auschwitz:

On one occasion I took an active part in an execution. This was in the Autumn of 1941 in the yard of Block 11. At that time some twenty to thirty Russian Commissars had been delivered by the Gestapo regional headquarters in Kattowitz (Katowice). Grabner, Palitsch and, if I remember correctly, a Blockführer from Block 11 and I took them to the execution yard. The two rifles were already in Block 11. The Russian Commissars were wearing Russian army uniforms — there was nothing that particularly distinguished them as Commissars. Who had established they were Commissars I do not know, but I assume that this was done by the Gestapo in Kattowitz, as many of their officials attended the execution as observers. I do not know whether or not these Commissars were sentenced to death in a regular fashion. I do not think so, for in my opinion Russian Commissars were executed by firing-squad almost without exception. The Russians were killed in pairs in the yard of the block while the others awaited their execution in the corridor of block 11. Grabner, Palitsch, the above-mentioned Blockführer and I took it in turns to shoot these twenty to thirty Commissars one after the other. Their bodies were piled up in a corner of the yard by prisoners from the bunker, if I remember correctly, and put into chests. Two bodies were put in one chest. These chests were taken to the small crematorium in a farm cart drawn by prisoners. I no longer know exactly how many of them I actually shot myself...

Stark also participated in the gassing of prisoners, specifically, the first gassing of prisoners in the small crematorium at the main camp. In a similar manner to his participation in the shootings, Stark stated that he was ordered by Grabner to check the number of prisoners. Around 200-250 Jewish men, women and children were ordered to enter the gas chamber. As they did so, medical orderlies climbed up the earth banks by the crematorium in order to get onto the roof of the gas chamber, from where they could insert the Zyklon B gas via vents in the roof; something which Stark admitted doing:

At another, later gassing — also in Autumn 1941 — Grabner ordered me to pour Zyklon B into the opening because only one medical orderly had shown up. During a gassing Zyklon B had to be poured through both openings of the gas-chamber room at the same time. This gassing was also a transport of 200-250 Jews, once again men, women and children. As the Zyklon B - as already mentioned - was in granular form, it trickled down over the people as it was being poured in. They then started to cry out terribly for they now knew what was happening to them. I did not look through the opening because it had to be closed as soon as the Zyklon B had been poured in. After a few minutes there was silence. After some time had passed, it may have been ten to fifteen minutes, the gas chamber was opened. The dead lay higgledy-piggledy all over the place. It was a dreadful sight.

In September 1942, Stark was promoted to SS-Oberscharführer. At the end of the year, he took leave again, enrolling himself at Frankfurt University where he studied law for a semester. An elite training course at Dachau and deployment on the Eastern Front were also parts of his career in the SS. He attained his desired career as a commissioned officer when, after attending an SS-Junkerschule, he was promoted to SS-Untersturmführer in November 1944. He was part of the Auschwitz staff from 15 December 1940 to 2 April 1943.

== Post-war ==
Following deployment to the capital in the Battle of Berlin, Stark was taken prisoner by the Soviets in early May 1945. However, he managed to escape within a few days, and subsequently did temporary work on farms in the Soviet-occupied area. In Autumn 1946, he took agricultural studies at the University of Giessen, but pending denazification proceedings meant he had to end his studies. He continued his studies with work experience and teaching practice (Vorbereitungsdienst) with the Hessian Agricultural Ministry, and in 1953, the year of his marriage (from which he had two children), he passed the exam to qualify as an assessor.

=== Trial ===
Until his arrest in April 1959, Stark taught at agricultural schools and gave business advice with the Frankfurt Chamber of Agriculture. He was remanded in custody from the end of October 1963 to mid-May 1964. One Frankfurt police interrogator stated that Stark was "very forthcoming", and "talked about some things that we did not know at the time." In August 1965, he was found guilty of at least 44 instances of joint-murder, and sentenced to ten years in prison: the maximum sentence that could be imposed on a minor. Stark's father committed suicide after the war, out of guilt for having allowed his son to join the SS.

In Stark's conviction, the court noted that:

During further gassings of Jews in May 1942, Stark frequently took Jewish women away to one side. When all the other Jews were in the gas chamber, he set the women against a wall in the courtyard of the small crematorium. Then, he shot one or two women in the chest and feet. Then, when the other women were trembling and falling to their knees to plead Stark to spare their lives, he shouted to them: "Sarah, Sarah, come on, get up!" Then he shot them all one after the other.

In his closing speech, Stark stated:

I have participated in the killing of many people. After the war I have often asked myself whether I became a criminal. I have not been able to find an answer to this question. I believed in the Führer, I wanted to serve my people. At the time, I was convinced that what I was doing was right. Today, I know that the ideas that I believed in are wrong. I very much regret the wrong path I took back then, but I can't undo it.

Expert witness Dr Helmut Lechler described Stark:

Defendant Stark is an example of how a young man with average talents and an entirely normal, inconspicuous disposition readily submits to what may be called a reversal of conscience. He is an example of a person's vulnerability to letting himself be perverted and turned into a tool of totalitarian potentates. As a result his moral control is replaced with the mind-set of a Führer. The final consequence is the development of functionaries without a conscience.

He was released from prison in 1968, and died on 29 March 1991, aged 69, in his hometown of Darmstadt.

== Bibliography ==
- Pendas, Devin Owen: The Frankfurt Auschwitz Trial, 1963-1965: Genocide, History, and the Limits of the Law. Cambridge University Press, 2006; ISBN 0-521-84406-1.
- Langbein, Hermann: People in Auschwitz. UNC Press, 2004; ISBN 0-8078-2816-5
- Klee, Ernst, Dressen, Willi., Riess, Volker: The Good Old Days: The Holocaust as Seen by Its Perpetrators and Bystanders, Free Press, originally from the University of Michigan, 1991; ISBN 0-02-917425-2
- Klee, Ernst: Das Personenlexikon zum Dritten Reich: Wer war was vor und nach 1945. Fischer-Taschenbuch-Verlag, Frankfurt am Main 2007; ISBN 978-3-596-16048-8
- Rees, Laurence: Auschwitz - the Nazis and the 'Final Solution', BBC Books, 2005, pg. 96; ISBN 0-563-52117-1
