= Victor Capesius =

Nazi war criminal (1907–1985)

Personal details
- Born: 7 February 1907 Szerdahely, Austria-Hungary (today Miercurea Sibiului, Romania)
- Died: 20 March 1985 (aged 78) Göppingen, West Germany
- Party: National Socialist German Workers' Party (NSDAP)
- Children: 3
- Education: University of Cluj, Transylvania (Romania) and University of Vienna, Austria
- Occupation: Doctor of Pharmacy
- Known for: "The Druggist of Auschwitz" KZ-Apotheker (Pharmacist) of Dachau Concentration Camp, Sep 1943 and Auschwitz Concentration Camp, Feb 1944—Jan 1945,

Military service
- Allegiance: Nazi Germany
- Branch/service: Schutzstaffel
- Rank: SS-Sturmbannführer

Victor Capesius (February 1907 – 20 March 1985) was a Nazi SS-Sturmbannführer (Major) and KZ-Apotheker (concentration camp pharmacist) in the concentration camps of Dachau (1943–1944) and Auschwitz (1944–1945).

== Early life ==
Born to a Saxon family in Reußmarkt, Transylvania, son of a doctor and pharmacist, Capesius began his academic studies in 1924 at the University of Cluj after graduating from high school. Capesius earned his undergraduate degree in general pharmacology from King Ferdinand I University on June 30, 1930. He worked towards a pharmacy degree and then transferred to the University of Vienna, where in 1933, he received his Doctorate of Pharmacy. He was married in June 1934 and worked for a subsidiary of IG Farben selling products to doctors and pharmacists.

== World War II ==
After the start of World War II in 1939, Capesius joined the Romanian army and rose to the rank of captain while serving at a military hospital's pharmacy. In January 1942, for reasons not made clear in his military records, he was granted leave to restart his civilian job as a national sale representative for IG Farben and Bayer. He traveled so much that at times he lived in both Klausenburg and Sighisoara before finally buying a sixth-floor condominium on Brezoianu Street in an upper-class Bucharest neighborhood. He moved his family there.

As an ethnic German, Capesius moved to the Waffen-SS after Romania joined the Axis powers in 1940. After training at the SS-Zentrale Sanitäranlage (Central Sanitary Facility) in Warsaw, he was sent to Dachau Concentration Camp in September 1943; he worked there until his subsequent transfer to Auschwitz Concentration Camp in December 1943. In Auschwitz, he acted as the chief KZ-Apotheker (pharmacist) starting in February 1944 after his predecessor was executed for "spreading defeatism." Capesius remained as the chief pharmacist until the camp was evacuated in January 1945. Capesius worked closely with Josef Mengele and together they were heavily involved in the selection of inmates for the gas chamber beginning in the spring of 1944 when the Hungarian and Transylvanian Jews were sent to the camp. He was the only SS selector who was recognized at the arrival ramp by Jews who had known him personally or through his pharmaceutical work before the war. In Auschwitz, he had risen to the rank of SS-Sturmbannführer, in November 1944, and was in charge and control of the poisonous chemicals used in the extermination of the Jews, such as phenol and Zyklon B. This was during the mass murder of almost 400,000 Hungarian Jews.

During his time at Auschwitz, Capesius stole valuables from the personal belongings of arriving Jews at the railhead and also secreted away gold pulled from the dental fillings of corpses. He had access to the gold since it was under the control of the camp's dentists, with whom he shared his pharmaceutical dispensary. Capesius sent the stolen gold to his sister for safekeeping until after the war.

== Post-War ==
After the liberation of the Auschwitz concentration camp, he went into hiding in Schleswig-Holstein and fell into British captivity from which he was discharged after one year. He then began to study electrical engineering at the Technical University in Stuttgart. During a visit to Munich in 1946, Capesius was recognized by a former Auschwitz political prisoner, Leon Czekalski, and was arrested at the main train station, Hauptbahnhof, by American military police and interned in the camps of Dachau and Ludwigsburg. After U.S. occupation authorities deemed his case unfit for prosecution, he was released in August 1947. He then went through denazification proceedings. He was found to be a major offender but managed to get that overturned by omitting his service at Auschwitz. He found a job in a Stuttgart pharmacy. In October 1950, he used the gold he had stolen from Auschwitz to open a pharmacy in Göppingen and a beauty parlour in Reutlingen.

== Frankfurt Auschwitz Trials ==
A camp survivor, Hermann Langbein, and Germany's first postwar Jewish prosecutor, Fritz Bauer, were persistent in trying to compile enough evidence to make a case against Capesius. As a result of their work, Capesius was arrested in Göppingen in early December 1959 and remained in custody without bail or bond. On 20 August 1965 he was indicted in the Frankfurt Auschwitz Trials by the Landgericht Frankfurt am Main Community for aiding and abetting the murder of at least four cases of 2,000 people. He was convicted and sentenced to nine years in prison. Capesius served only eight years and was released from prison in January 1968.

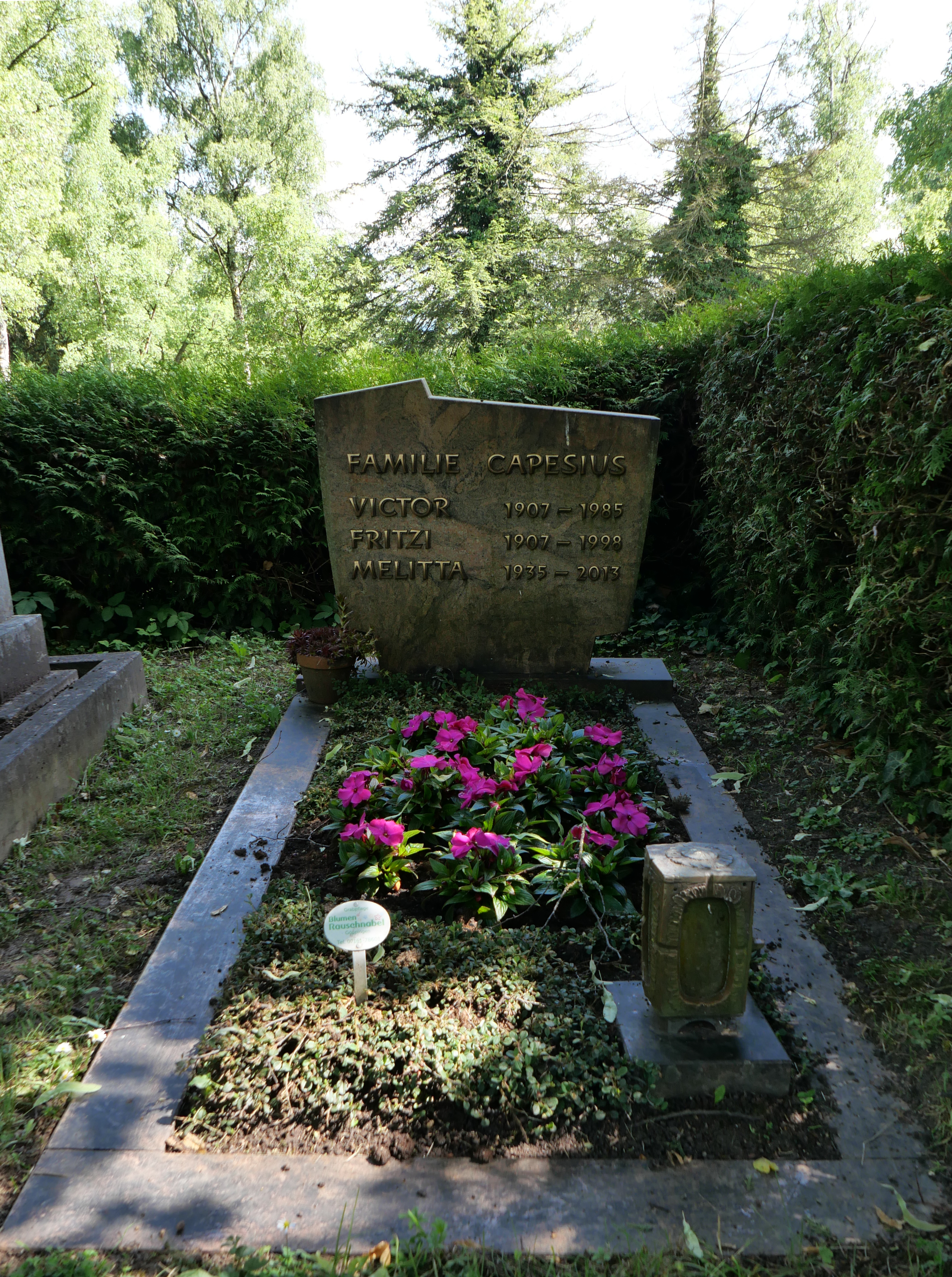
The grave in 2025.

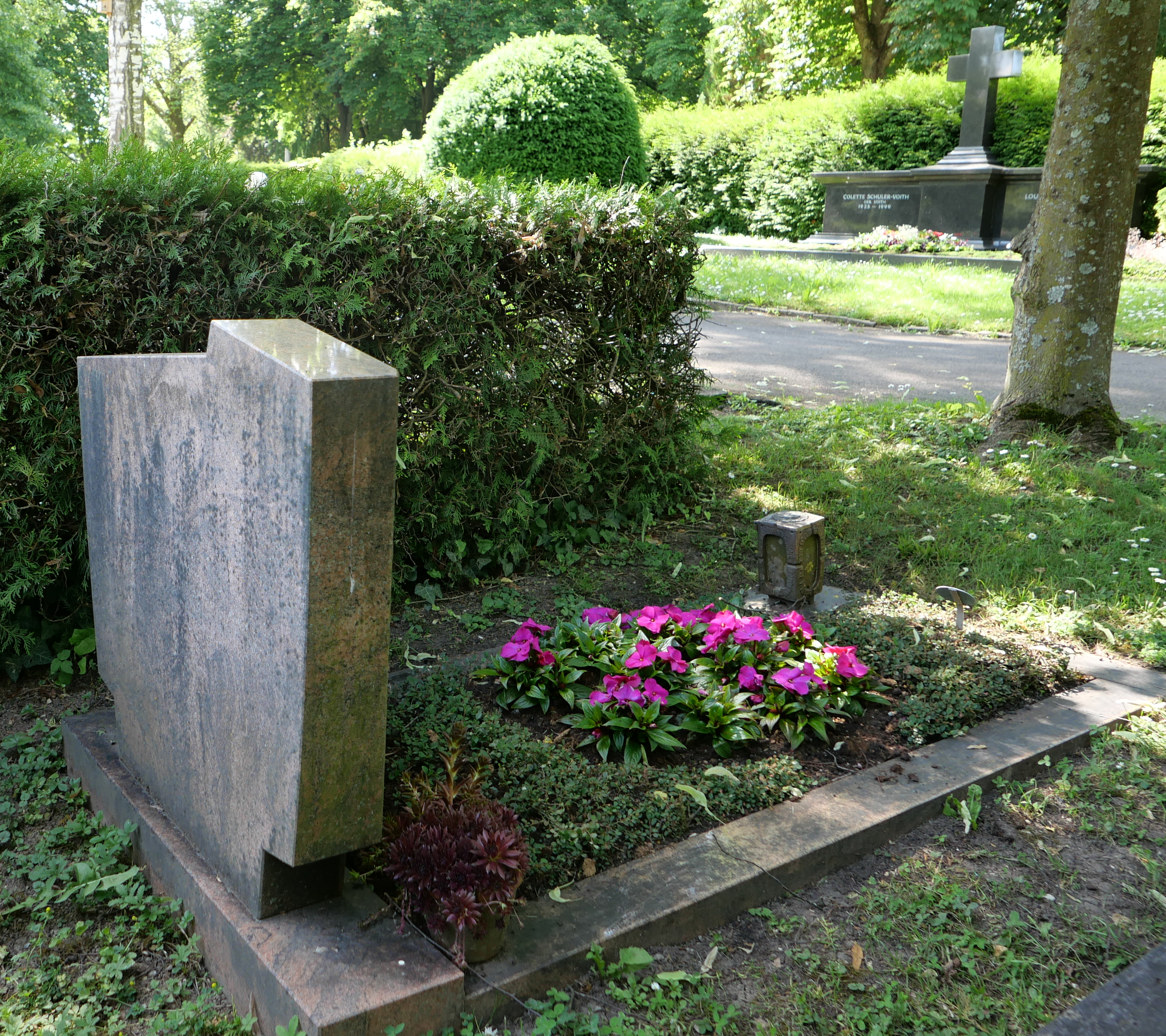
Behind the round bush is the Jewish part of the cemetery.

== Death ==
Capesius died from natural causes on 20 March 1985, in his home at Göppingen. He was unrepentant until his death. His wife, Friederike (Fritzi), died in 1998.

Capesius is buried in Göppingen's main cemetery. His widow and a daughter were interred beside him. Just a few meters from the family grave is the Jewish section of the cemetery, which also commemorates several people murdered in Auschwitz.
