= Stefan Baretzki =

SS guard at Auschwitz of Romanian Volksdeutsche origin

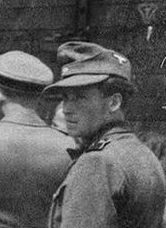
- Baretzki at the Judenrampe at Auschwitz II-Birkenau during a selection
- Born: 24 March 1919; Cernăuți (Czernowitz), Kingdom of Romania
- Died: 21 June 1988 (aged 69); Bad Nauheim, Hesse, West Germany
- Cause of death: Suicide
- Known for: SS guard at Auschwitz
- Status: Deceased
- Conviction: Murder
- Trial: Frankfurt Auschwitz trials
- Penalty: Life imprisonment plus eight years
- SS career
- Allegiance: Nazi Germany
- Branch: Waffen-SS
- Service years: 1942–1945
- Rank: Rottenführer
- Unit: Auschwitz concentration camp

Stefan Baretzki (24 March 1919 – 21 June 1988) was an Auschwitz guard of Bukovina German origin. He was conscripted into the Waffen-SS and stationed at the Auschwitz concentration camp from 1942 until 1945. There he participated in the mass murder by making selections, beatings and murdering prisoners on his own initiative. After the war, Baretzki settled in West Germany. He was the lowest-ranking of the twenty-four defendants in the Frankfurt Auschwitz trials. His murders were sensationalized in the German press, taking the focus off the systematic crimes of the Nazi regime. The court sentenced him to life imprisonment and eight years for participating in the murder of more than 8,000 people. Baretzki expressed regret for his actions, testified against his former superiors, and died by suicide while serving his sentence.

== Early life ==
Stefan Baretzki was born in 1919 into a Bukovina German family in Cernăuți (Czernowitz), then part of the Kingdom of Romania. Hermann Langbein, an Austrian historian and Auschwitz political prisoner, noted that Baretzki was born in the same town as Viktor Pestek, an Auschwitz guard executed by the Nazis because he helped Siegfried Lederer, a Czech Jew, to escape. Baretzki had only an elementary school education and never spoke German well. He was conscripted into the SS in 1941, after an announcement in his church encouraged him to resettle in Breslau, then part of Germany, as part of the Heim ins Reich ("Back home to the Reich") policy of resettling Volksdeutsche (ethnic Germans) in Greater Germany.

== Auschwitz ==
Baretzki served as a block officer in Auschwitz II-Birkenau from 1942 to 1945. With other Volksdeutsche guards, he was shown antisemitic propaganda films such as Jud Süß and Ohm Krüger after work. Encouraged by the films, guards would beat up Jewish prisoners the following morning. Baretzki stated at his trial that when Volksdeutsche guards asked why prisoners were sent to Auschwitz, they were told that all of them were dangerous criminals convicted of sabotage. When asked how small children could be guilty, it was explained to the guards they were too uneducated to understand, and it would be clear later. They were also told that all things authorized by Adolf Hitler were legal. Baretzki claimed not to believe these assurances and considered going into hiding when he went to Romania on leave in 1943. He did not do so because, according to him, he feared repercussions against his family. According to Rebecca Wittmann, Baretzki's admission that he knew that the mass murder of Jews was illegal sealed his conviction.

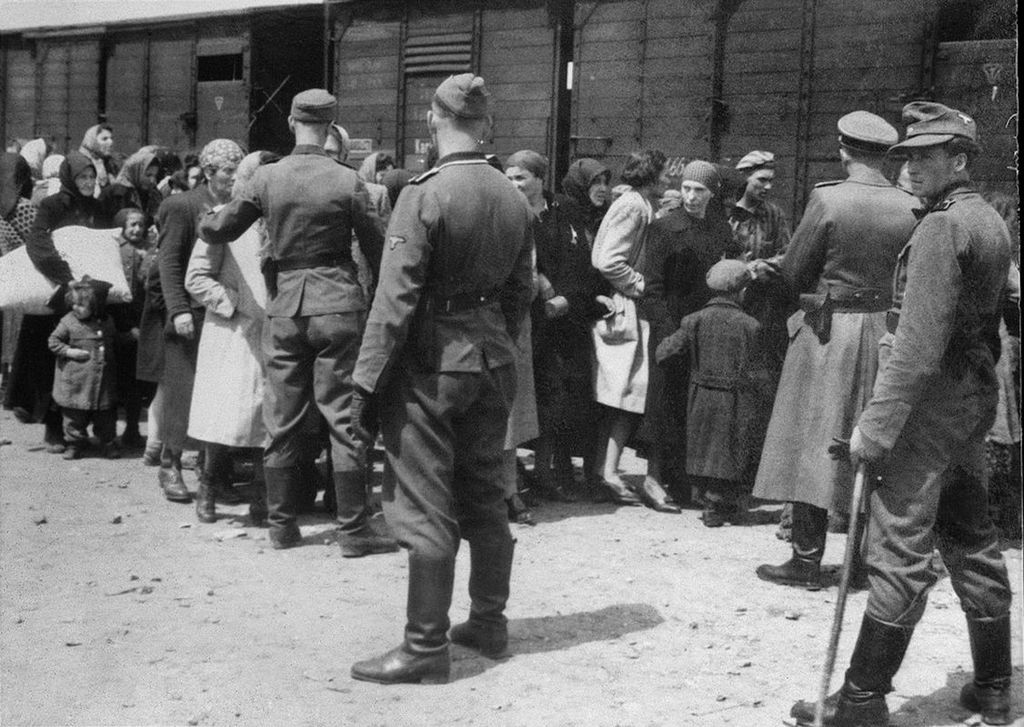
Baretzki on the Judenrampe during a selection. He is at the right of the photo facing the camera, carrying a baton that he frequently used to beat inmates.

At his trial, Baretzki described how he treated inmates who had been transferred from subcamps because they had become too starved or ill to work. He did not allow any of them to register for the camp. He held them instead in a quarantine block until they died, not even allowing them to enter the barracks because the starving prisoners would create a mess. Otto Wolken alleged that Baretzki practiced a sport he called the "rabbit hunt", where prisoners were ordered to remove their caps, and anyone who did not do so quickly enough was beaten and shot. However, during the trial, a judge determined that Wolken's 1945 report of this incident did not identify Baretzki as being involved, and that Wolken was short sighted and had observed the alleged shooting from 50 meters away.

At other times, Baretzki reportedly helped inmates, such as bringing water to women confined to "Mexico", an especially primitive section of the camp lacking the most basic facilities. SS-Obersturmführer Johann Schwarzhuber, the commandant of Auschwitz II-Birkenau, thwarted these efforts. Schwarzhuber told Baretzki that he should not have any compassion for Jewish prisoners. In the spring of 1944, Viktor Pestek was arrested after returning to the camp and attempting to rescue additional inmates. Baretzki claimed that he had seen other SS men beating Pestek. Ryszard Henryk Kordek, a prisoner, contradicted this saying that Baretzki had raised the alarm over Pestek's return, and was one of the guards who beat him. During the liquidation of the Theresienstadt family camp in July 1944, Baretzki asked his superiors to spare the lives of the children imprisoned there. A selection was held for teenage boys, and some were saved, but Franz Lucas intervened to prevent saving the girls. Asked to explain his actions at his trial, Baretzki stated that he had often attended theatrical performances at the children's block in the family camp.

After the evacuation of Auschwitz, Baretzki was transferred to the SS division "30 January" and captured by Soviet forces in early May. Released on 17 August 1945, he settled near Koblenz and worked in a coal shop. In 1953, he was sentenced to 21 days in jail for assault; two years later, he was fined for resisting arrest. In 1956, he was fined once more for assault. He was never married.

== Trial ==
A warrant for Baretzki's arrest was issued on 3 March 1960, and he was apprehended a month later. He was the lowest-ranking of twenty-four men indicted at the Frankfurt Auschwitz trials; his defense attorneys were Eugen Gerhardt and Engelbert Jorschko. Because the defendants were tried under ordinary criminal law, a distinction was made between individual acts of cruelty, which were punished as murder, and participation in the program of mass extermination, which was only charged as being an accomplice to murder. As one of the more brutal SS guards, Baretzki could be proved to have murdered on his own initiative and therefore received a harsher sentence than many of his superiors. In the German press, gruesome stories of the brutality of individual guards, including Baretzki, came to overshadow the larger point of prosecutor Fritz Bauer: that every SS guard, even those who did not personally commit shocking acts of sadism, was a voluntary participant in the system of extermination.

Baretzki was found guilty of five counts of murder: he beat a starving prisoner to death and, on 21 June 1944, drowned four prisoners in a water tank of section BIId. He was also convicted as an accomplice to the mass murder of Jews on eleven occasions. He assisted in the murder of at least 3,000 people by participating in the liquidation of the Theresienstadt family camp in March 1944. During five selections on the Judenrampe, he was an accomplice to at least 1,000 murders. On five occasions he was found to have assisted in block selections where worn-out inmates were selected for death; in each of these incidents, more than 50 people were murdered. In addition, the court found that he was guilty of three other crimes. These included punishing prisoners in section BIId of the camp who attempted to communicate with inmates in other parts of the camp by forcing them to perform strenuous exercises, during which he shot at least five prisoners. The court did not assign additional punishment for these crimes but used them as further evidence of Baretzki's brutality. Otto Dov Kulka and other witnesses testified that Baretzki killed other prisoners, but he was not charged with these murders. He was sentenced to life imprisonment and eight years.

Because the court described him as a "simpleton" and "less intelligent than all the other defendants", Baretzki's admission that he knew that the mass murder of Jews was a crime was used to prove that the other defendants knew that their actions were criminal as well. He was the only defendant to testify against other defendants, offering damning testimony about the conditions at the camp. About the SS doctor Franz Lucas, who initially denied having participated in selections, Baretzki stated: "I was not blind when Dr. Lucas made selections on the ramp. ... Five thousand men he sent to the gas [chambers] in half an hour, and today he wants to stand as a savior." (Note: German: Ich bin doch nicht blind gewesen, als der Dr. Lucas auf der Rampe selektiert hat. … Fünftausend Mann, die hat er in einer halben Stunde ins Gas geschickt, und heute will er sich als Retter hinstellen.)

Baretzki said that Lucas changed his behavior during the final months of the war only when it was clear that Germany would lose. As a result, other witnesses came forward stating that Lucas had selected inmates to live or die. Lucas eventually admitted having done so on four occasions, but on orders and against his personal conviction. The court found that he had participated in murder.

== Later life ==
Baretzki also testified against Kurt Knittel, who was in charge of the propaganda department at Auschwitz. When he was dismissed from a government post in education following public outcry, Knittel sued the government to be reinstated. Called as a witness, Baretzki testified that Knittel had said that Jewish women and children had to be murdered because they were of an inferior race. According to Baretzki: "We learned how to murder from Herr Knittel's lectures."

While in prison, Baretzki helped Langbein with his research into the camp. Baretzki told Langbein that he hoped Auschwitz would never happen again. According to Langbein, he accepted his guilt and said that serving jail time was the only thing he could do for the prisoners he had murdered. Baretzki said he only appealed his sentence due to pressure from his fellow defendants, on whom he was financially dependent for his legal fees. The appeal failed, and Baretzki killed himself at a hospital in Bad Nauheim on 21 June 1988.

== Cultural references ==
German actor Jonas Nay played Baretzki in The Tattooist of Auschwitz. He said the role was deeply disturbing and he nearly quit.

== Bibliography ==
- Kárný, Miroslav (1997). "Die Flucht des Auschwitzer Häftlings Vítězslav Lederer und der tschechische Widerstand" [The Escape of Auschwitz Prisoner Vítězslav Lederer and the Czech Resistance]. Theresienstädter Studien und Dokumente (in German) (4): 157–183.
- Langbein, Hermann (2004) [First published in German in 1972]. People in Auschwitz. Translated by Zohn, Harry. Chapel Hill: University of North Carolina Press in connection with the United States Holocaust Memorial Museum. ISBN 978-0-8078-6363-3.
- Morris, Heather (2018). Le tatoueur d'Auschwitz [Auschwitz Tattoo Artist] (in French). City Edition. ISBN 978-2-8246-4688-6.
- Wittmann, Rebecca (2012). Beyond justice: the Auschwitz trial. Harvard University Press. ISBN 978-0-674-04529-3.
