= Oswald Kaduk =

German Nazi SS member

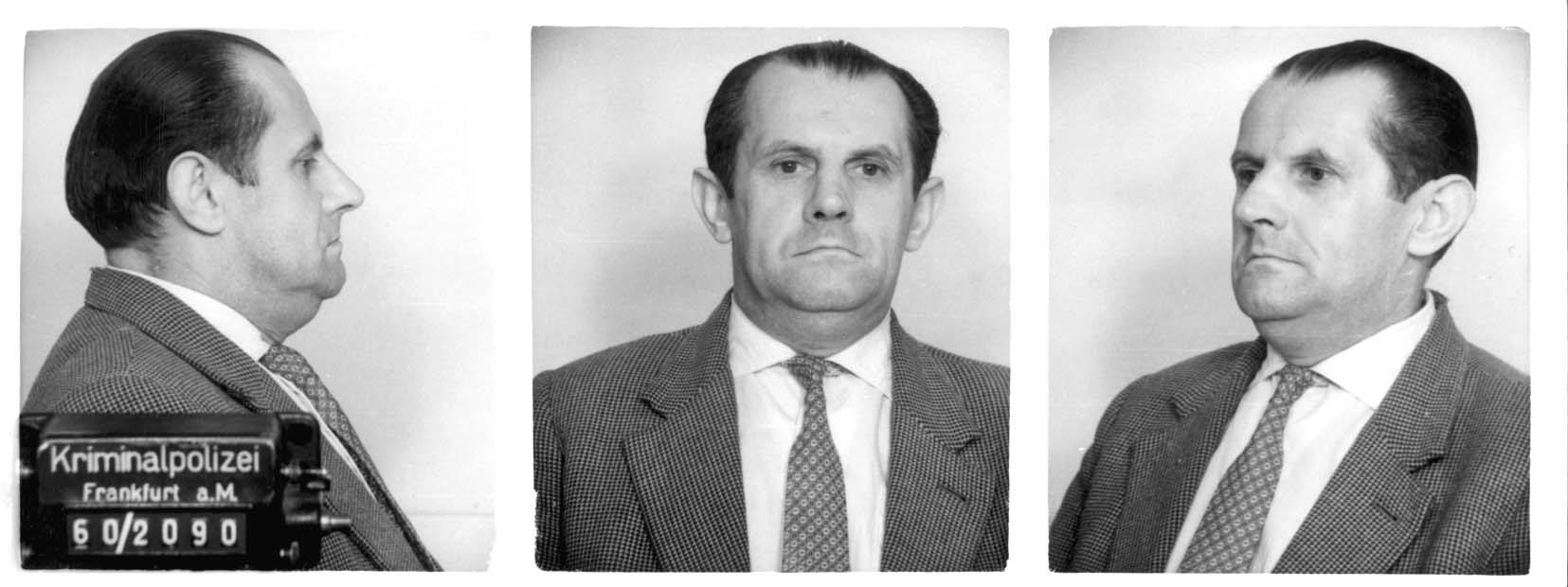

Oswald Kaduk (26 August 1906 – 31 May 1997) was a German SS member during the Nazi era. He served as Rapportführer at the Auschwitz concentration camp.

== Biography ==
The son of a blacksmith, Kaduk was born in Königshütte, Upper Silesia. After attending the Volksschule he trained as a butcher before becoming one in 1924. As well as working at the local slaughterhouse, Kaduk also held positions with fire fighting services at the municipal fire brigade in Chorzów and at a chemical plant.

=== World War II ===
In 1939 he joined the Allgemeine SS and in 1940 he was drafted into the Waffen-SS. He was sent to the Eastern Front, but due to various illnesses and stays at military hospitals he was posted to Auschwitz in 1941. At first he was assigned to watch tower duties in 1942, then became Blockführer and finally Rapportführer. One prisoner reported that he had a weakness for schnapps.

Kaduk was considered "one of the cruelest, brutalest, most vulgar" of SS men at Auschwitz:

"In the evening rollcall one late summer's evening of 1944, a prisoner was missing. Inmates present had to wait until the missing prisoner was accounted for. Kaduk and another Rapportführer beat the prisoner until he fell to the floor several times. [...] Eventually the prisoner remained on the ground lying on his back but still alive. Using all their strength, Kaduk and the other Rapportführer trod on the prisoner's ribcage with the heels of their boots — according to the declaration of the court — until his ribs cracked. They did not cease [...] until the prisoner was dead."

Historian Andrew Roberts in his book The Storm of War recounted Kaduk's practice of handing Jewish children balloons just before they were murdered with a phenol injection to the heart at a rate of ten children per minute.

Kaduk witnessed the mass murder of people in gas chambers, and describing his SS colleagues inserting the Zyklon B gas, he said:

"It's hard for me to say. But I have personally seen it. Only the doctors gave the orders to insert the gas. I have even seen SS men who were supposed to be involved in gassing operations cry. And to them, the then doctor, Dr. Mengele said, 'You have to do it'. He said... I can remember Theuer well. I knew him from... was my fellow countryman, been a young man. And he said, 'You have to do it.' He did it, with tears in his eyes. He inserted it and immediately shut the hatch. I was there."

— Oswald Kaduk, "Auschwitz, Stimmen."

Kaduk is also known for Kaduk's chapel, a tiny tower between the barracks and the main camp of Auschwitz.

=== Criminal convictions ===
After Germany's surrender, Kaduk worked in a sugar factory in Löbau. In December 1946 he was recognized by a former prisoner and consequently arrested by a Soviet military patrol. In 1947, a Soviet military tribunal sentenced him to 25 years of hard labour, but he was released in April 1956.

Kaduk then went to West Berlin, working at a hospital as a nurse. Despite his violent reputation at Auschwitz, he earned the nickname "Papa Kaduk" among patients.

In July 1959 Kaduk was again arrested and appeared in the Frankfurt Auschwitz Trials where he was one of the main accused. On 19 August 1965 the court sentenced him to life imprisonment for murder in ten cases, and joint murder in at least one thousand cases. Because of the gravity of Kaduk's deeds, the responsible Spruchkammern rejected various pleas for clemency.

While in prison, Kaduk was interviewed as part of a TV documentary about SS men stationed at Auschwitz. When asked about Holocaust denial, Kaduk says:

(Interviewer) Today there are many people that say Auschwitz was a lie, that nobody at all was gassed.

(Kaduk) I have to say, I do not consider these people normal. We have to stick to the truth. There are people denying it, but what happened, happened, and it is not up for dispute."

— Oswald Kaduk, "Drei Deutsche Mörder. Aufzeichnungen über die Banalität des Bösen"

After the 1984 transfer to open prison (Offener Vollzug), Kaduk was released from the Schwalmstadt prison in 1989 for health reasons (Haftunfähigkeit). He died in Langelsheim, Harz, as a pensioner in 1997, at the age of 90.

== Literature ==
- Demant, Ebbo (Hg.): Auschwitz — "Direkt von der Rampe weg…" Kaduk, Erber, Klehr: Drei Täter geben zu Protokoll: Hamburg: Rowohlt, 1979 ISBN 3-499-14438-7
- Ernst Klee: Das Personenlexikon zum Dritten Reich: Wer war was vor und nach 1945. Fischer-Taschenbuch-Verlag, Frankfurt am Main 2005. ISBN 3-596-16048-0
- Hermann Langbein: Menschen in Auschwitz. Frankfurt am Main, Berlin Wien, Ullstein-Verlag, 1980, ISBN 3-548-33014-2.
- Auschwitz-Birkenau State Museum: Auschwitz in den Augen der SS. Oswiecim 1998, ISBN 83-85047-35-2.
