= Franz Lucas =

German concentration camp doctor (1911–1994)

Franz Bernhard Lucas
- Postwar photograph of former SS doctor Franz Lucas
- Born: 15 September 1911; Osnabrück
- Died: 7 December 1994 (aged 83); Elmshorn
- Military career
- Allegiance: Nazi Germany
- Branch: Sturmabteilung, Schutzstaffel
- Service years: 1933–1934, 1937–1945
- Rank: SS-Obersturmführer
- Service number: SS #350,030

Franz Bernhard Lucas (15 September 1911, in Osnabrück – 7 December 1994, in Elmshorn) was a German concentration camp doctor.

== Early life and education ==
Franz Lucas was the son of a butcher. After attending school in Osnabrück and Meppen, he passed his Abitur in 1933. He studied four semesters of Philology in Münster, and graduated in medical studies in Rostock and Danzig in 1942, where in the same year he was awarded his medical doctorate.

== Nazi career ==
From June 1933 to September 1934 he was a member of the SA. On 1 May 1937, he joined the NSDAP. On 15 November 1937, he got into the SS (No. 350 030), reaching the rank of SS First Lieutenant in 1943. In 1942, Lucas received a two-month training course under a leading contender in the Waffen-SS medical academy in Graz.

Thereafter, he became a medical officer in Nuremberg and Belgrade. Because of "defeatist remarks", Lucas had to serve a short time in a probation unit. On 27 September 1943, he received a letter with a new assignment. He was summoned to the Führungshauptamt - Office Group D - in order to provide medical services to the Waffen-SS in Berlin beginning on October 1. As of 15 December 1943, he was transferred to the Office D III for Sanitation and Camp Hygiene of WVHA in Oranienburg, led by Enno Lolling.

From mid-December 1943 to late summer 1944, Lucas was a Truppenarzt (military doctor) in Auschwitz I and operating in the Auschwitz concentration camp (Gypsy camp, Theresienstadt family camp). Afterwards, he had further short-term missions in the Mauthausen concentration camp in 1944, Stutthof concentration camp in 1944, Ravensbrück concentration camp in 1944, and Sachsenhausen in January 1945, where he served in March 1945 and appeared in Berlin with a letter of recommendation from a female Norwegian prisoner from the Ravensbrück concentration camp. Before the Battle of Berlin, Lucas fled in April 1945 to the west.

On 8 December 1944, as Lagerarzt (camp doctor) and SS-Obersturmführer in Stutthof concentration camp, Lucas inspected the dead body of Justus Nussbaum, the brother of Osnabrück's famous painter Felix Nussbaum, to attest that Justus allegedly deceased in Lager-Block 13 at 6:50 a.m. on 7 December 1944 of a general cardiac insufficiency.

His colleague in Ravensbrück, Percy Treite, said during the first Ravensbrück process about him: "Dr. Lucas was not under my responsibility, he took part in selections for the gas chamber and in shootings. After disagreements with Dr. Trommer, he went to Sachsenhausen and was sent as a punishment by all camps in Germany." The reason for this disagreement with Treite was that Lucas was issuing death certificates for the deceased prisoners from the concentration camp Uckermark, but they would never take a closer look. In addition, Treite had been present during the first shootings, after he had denied his participation, and Lucas had to take over the activities; but Lucas denied this after a few days.

== Post-war ==
Immediately after the war, Lucas escaped the denazification process and immediately got a job at the city hospital in Elmshorn, first as a medical assistant, then as assistant medical director and finally as chief physician of the gynecological department. On learning of the charges against him, he lost his job in 1963 and worked in private practice.

== Auschwitz trial ==
During the Frankfurt Auschwitz trials held between 1963–1965, Lucas first denied having carried out selections; he also denied that he had authorized the use of Zyklon B in the gas chambers and had supervised the killings. Testimony statements contradicted his story.

On the 87th day of the trial, Helen Goldmann, a Jewish girl originally from Czechoslovakia who was deported to Auschwitz in May 1944, testified that Dr. Lucas threw her two-year-old sister on the floor, selecting her mother, her sister, a second three-year-old sister, and her brother to be murdered in the gas chambers. She was told later that day, "If Doctor Lucas was at the station picking them right and left, he says, then my mother and the children are not going to be living long, they're going to be killed the same day."

On the 137th day of the trial, one of the defendants gave evidence for the first time as a witness against a co-defendant in a concentration camp trial. Former SS guard Stefan Baretzki: "I was not blind when Dr. Lucas had selected on the ramp. ... Five thousand men, he sent them to the gas [chambers] in half an hour, and today he wants to stand as a savior." Lucas now agreed that he had been involved in four selections, but claimed he had been obeying orders and had conducted the selections against his will.

The jury in Frankfurt found him guilty of selecting at least one thousand people in at least four selections, and sentenced him on 20 August 1965 to three years and three months' imprisonment. On 26 March 1968, Lucas was released from custody. When the verdict was reviewed by the Federal Supreme Court on 20 February 1969, it was decided that the question of the "compulsion at the ramp" of Auschwitz must be rethought due to the positive character image Lucas presented in the trial. On 8 October 1970, he was released. During these proceedings, many prisoners spoke positively about Lucas, while the statements that led to his earlier condemnation were judged to be based on hearsay.

Lucas was "involved in the extermination of human beings", but "did not deal with perpetrators, but only against his will", citing the so-called "putative emergency" according to § 52 StGB. Therefore, "no charge of guilt in the criminal sense" could be made.

== Later life and death ==
From 1970 to 30 September 1983, he again worked in his own private practice and died on 7 December 1994.
