= Wilhelm Boger =

German concentration camp overseer (1906–1977)

Wilhelm Friedrich Boger
- Born: 19 December 1906; Zuffenhausen, Kingdom of Württemberg, German Empire
- Died: 3 April 1977 (aged 70); Bietigheim-Bissingen, Baden-Württemberg, West Germany
- Status: Deceased
- Convictions: Murder (114 counts); Accessory to murder (1000 counts)
- Trial: Frankfurt Auschwitz trials
- Penalty: Life imprisonment with hard labour
- Military career
- Allegiance: Nazi Germany
- Branch: Schutzstaffel
- Rank: SS-Hauptsturmführer

Wilhelm Friedrich Boger (19 December 1906 – 3 April 1977), known as "The Tiger of Auschwitz", was a German police commissioner and concentration camp overseer. He gained infamy for the atrocities he committed at Auschwitz, including torturing prisoners using a device known as the Boger swing.

== Early life ==
Born in Zuffenhausen near Stuttgart, Germany, as the son of a merchant, Boger joined the HJ (Hitler youth) in his teens. After finishing high school ("Mittlere Reife") in 1922, he learned the trade of his father over the next 3 years and in 1925 took an office job in Stuttgart at the "Deutsch-Nationalen Handlungsgehilfenverband". He entered the Artamanen-Bund, a völkisch agrarian movement, and joined the Nazi Party in 1929. He was a member of the general SS beginning in 1930. After losing his job in 1932, he was admitted to the Auxiliary Police at Friedrichshafen, and in July 1933, to the political police ("Politische Polizei im Volksstaat Württemberg", since December 1933 part of the Gestapo) in Stuttgart. From 1936 to 37 he attended the police training school. He was appointed Police Commissioner ("Kriminalkommissar") after passing the police force examination in 1937, even though he had been taken into custody in 1936 for mistreating a prisoner during an interrogation.

== World War II ==
At the beginning of the Second World War Boger was transferred to the state police lead office at Zichenau. Three weeks later he was placed in charge of setting up and supervising the border police station in Ostrołęka, Poland. In 1940 Boger joined the 2nd SS and Police Engineer reserve unit ("Polizeipioniersbataillion") based in Dresden, from where he was dispatched to the front and subsequently wounded in 1942. Nine months later, Boger was transferred to Auschwitz, first serving as Zugführer of the 2nd guard company, and later as Untersturmführer (Second Lieutenant) in the Auschwitz political department. The Political Department was the representative of the RSHA in the camp, and its chief responsibilities were the reception of prisoners, keeping files on individual prisoners, maintaining the security of the camp, combating internal resistance, and conducting interrogations. From 23 December 1943 until the evacuation of the camp, Boger was leader of the investigations and interrogations section, with the rank of SS-Hauptsturmführer.

=== The "Boger swing" ===
Wilhelm Boger invented the "Boger swing", an instrument of torture. Reported after the war by his secretary, Frau Braun:

It was a meter-long iron bar suspended by chains hung from the ceiling ... A prisoner would be brought in for "questioning," stripped naked and bent over the bar, wrists manacled to ankles. A guard at one side would shove him—or her—off across the chamber in a long, slow arc, while Boger would ask "questions," at first quietly, then barking them out, and at the last bellowing. At each return, another guard armed with a crowbar would smash the victim across the buttocks. As the swinging went on and on, and the wailing victim fainted, was revived only to faint howling again, the blows continued—until only a mass of bleeding pulp hung before their eyes. Most perished from the ordeal--some sooner, some later. In the end a sack of [sic] bones and flayed flesh and fat was swept along the shambles of that concrete floor to be dragged away.

== Post-war ==
His crimes in the Political Department continued until the evacuation of Auschwitz in January 1945. Boger was detained by American military police on 19 June 1945, in Ludwigsburg, where his parents were living. He would have been extradited to Poland for trial but managed to escape from custody in November 1946. From 1948 until mid 1949, he was working as a farm hand in Crailsheim. He then lived with his family under his proper name in Hemmingen near Leonberg. He found a job as supervisor of supplies at the Heinkelwerke, an airplane factory in his birthplace Stuttgart-Zuffenhausen, where he was apprehended in October 1958 at the age of 51. He had heretofore led a withdrawn life; when acquaintances or neighbors asked him about his activities at KZ Auschwitz, he would reply that he had done nothing worthy of regret.

== Frankfurt Auschwitz Trials ==
In 1963 he was a defendant in the Frankfurt Auschwitz Trials, charged with aiding and abetting the murder of Jews.

The trial featured testimony from witnesses, including one who testified about Boger's gruesome murder of a small child:

“The 5‐year‐old child, clasping an apple in his hands, had jumped off a truck filled with other boys and girls en route to the gas chamber,” the witness said. “Boger grabbed the crying boy by his feet and hurled him against the nearest wall."

The witness testified she had been forced to clean the wall, and that Boger munched the apple later while he interrogated another prisoner.

At the conclusion of the trial in August 1965, Boger was sentenced to life imprisonment with hard labour for murder in at least 114 cases and an accessory to murder in at least 1000 cases. In his final statement to the court, Boger downplayed his personal guilt. He claimed that he did not beat prisoners to death and just carried out orders. Like the other defendants, he showed no regret.

== Death and aftermath ==
On 3 April 1977, he died at the age of 70 in prison.

In 2011, Boger's granddaughter recounted that she only learned the truth about her grandfather when she was in university, and that it took her several years of therapy to begin to cope with that. She said that she found it hard to come to terms with the fact that the man who had killed a little boy and eaten his apple had placed a photo of her as a little girl on the wall of his prison cell.
