= Robert Mulka =

German concentration camp administrator (1895–1969)

- 1962 mugshot of Mulka in custody of the Hamburg Police
- Born: 12 April 1895; Hamburg, Germany
- Died: 26 April 1969 (aged 74) Hamburg, West Germany
- Allegiance: Nazi Germany
- Branch: Schutzstaffel
- Rank: SS-Hauptsturmführer Demoted to SS-Obersturmführer
- Commands: Auschwitz Concentration Camp
- Conflicts: World War II

Robert Karl Ludwig Mulka (12 April 1895 – 26 April 1969) was an SS-Hauptsturmführer (captain) and later demoted to Obersturmführer (first lieutenant or lieutenant). He was a commander at Auschwitz concentration camp. Known as the "Eichmann of Auschwitz", he was adjutant to the camp commandant, SS-Obersturmbannführer Rudolf Höss, making him second in command of the camp.

== Life ==
Mulka was the son of a postal assistant. After attending the Volksschule and Realschule, he obtained his secondary school diploma in 1911 and subsequently became a business apprentice at an export agency.

In August 1914, he signed up to serve in the First World War; he served in France, Russia and Turkey, eventually being promoted to second lieutenant of the reserve Imperial Army. From 1918 to 1920 he joined the Baltische Landeswehr and fought against Bolshevism in the Baltics. In 1920, he returned to his hometown, where shortly after taking up work at an agency firm, he was found guilty of receiving stolen property and sentenced to eight months in prison.

Mulka remained with this firm (with whom he had completed his training) until 1931. He became independent, but his own import/export companies were by no means swamped with trade. From 1928 to 1934, Mulka joined Der Stahlhelm, which inspired him to be part of the newly strengthened Reichswehr.

He was also a member of the Nationalverband Deutscher Offiziere (National Federation of German Officers and the Deutscher Fichte-Bund. There, he trained in the reserves and was eventually promoted to first lieutenant in 1935, but was released when the army learned of his criminal record, which in turn thwarted all the efforts he made after the start of the Second World War to become an army officer again.

== SS career and participation in mass murder ==
Following his application in September 1939, Mulka joined the Nazi Party in 1940 as member number 7,848,085. Unwilling to begin as a common soldier and work his way up through the ranks, he applied to be a commissioned officer and successfully joined the Waffen-SS as an SS-Obersturmführer. He worked briefly as company leader of a sapper unit, but was declared only employable at garrisons in the homeland due to illness. As a result, he was deployed to Auschwitz at the beginning of 1942. After he had led a watch company for a few weeks, the camp commandant's adjutant became ill, and thus Mulka became the chief of staff of the commandant's office at Auschwitz-Birkenau concentration camp.

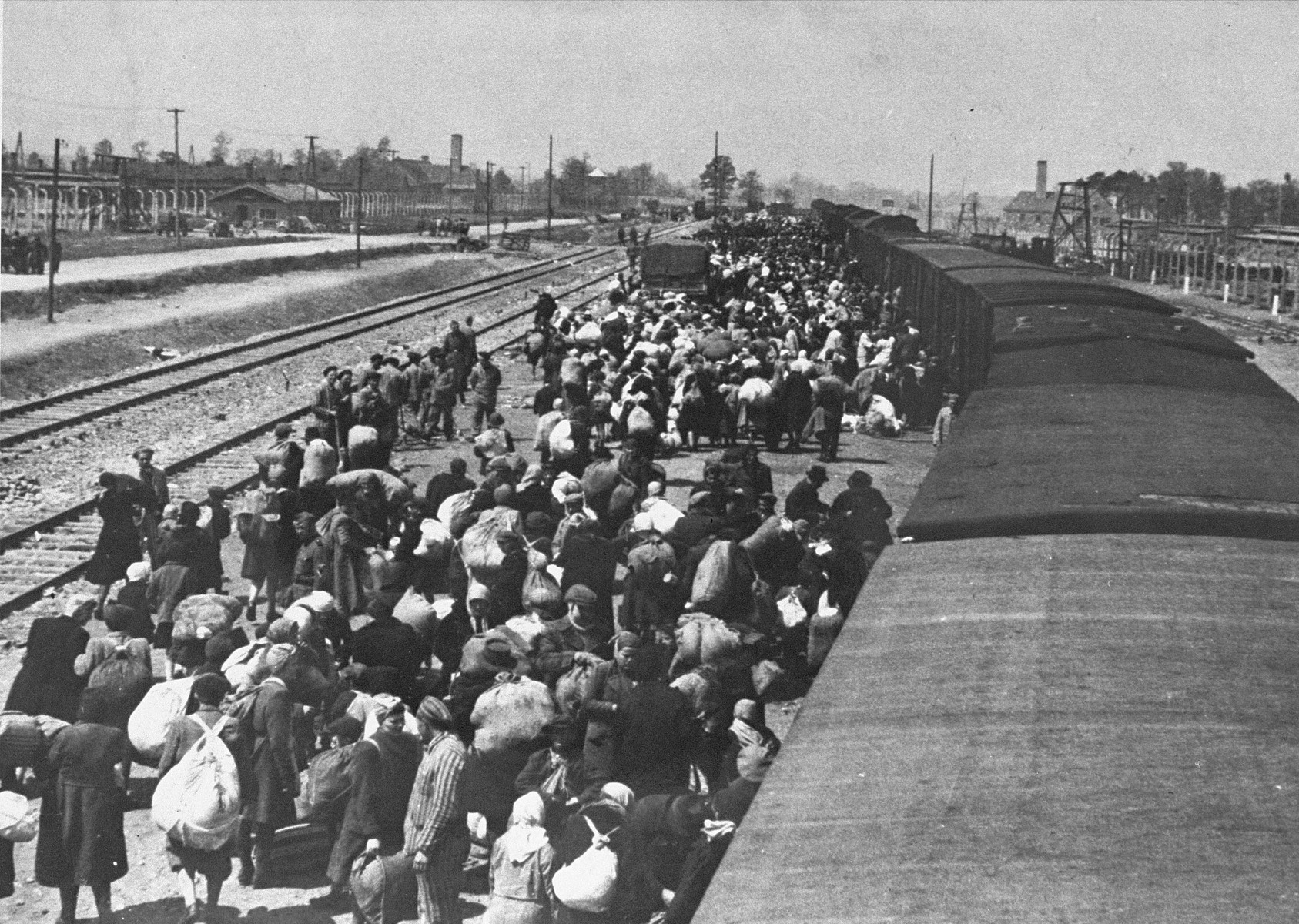
The ramp at Birkenau. Chimneys of Crematoria II and III at the horizon

Mulka's tenure as Höss' adjutant began on 1 July 1942, and came to an end on March 30, 1943, when Hildegard Bischoff, wife of SS-Sturmbannführer Karl Bischoff (architect of the crematoria and gas chambers), claimed that he made a derogatory mark about Joseph Goebbels. He was briefly arrested, but the proceedings against him were dropped; however, he lost his position as SS-Hauptsturmführer and was demoted to SS-Obersturmführer.

Mulka subsequently returned to Hamburg in mid-1943 during the bombing of the city. Later he worked under the Nordsee High SS and Police command. Early in 1944 he was deployed to an SS sapper school near Prague, but after about a year illness forced his return to Hamburg, where he remained as the war came to an end.

== Post-war ==
In 1945, Mulka set up his own company: Import/Export Agency Robert Mulka. In the spring of 1948, he was arrested and kept in custody because of his SS membership. He was prosecuted and convicted under denazification proceedings, but was exonerated from his original one and a half year prison sentence.

In 1960, an attorney from the Frankfurt Public Prosecutor's office was reading the newspaper, which reported the success of a certain Rolf Mulka, a bronze medal-winning yachtsman, at the Rome Olympics. The prosecutor, who had been investigating Auschwitz since 1959, recognized the relatively uncommon name and investigated Rolf's father. His suspicion was correct, and Robert Mulka was arrested in November 1960. He was remanded in custody from then until March 1961, from May until December 1961, from February until October 1964, and then from December 1964.

=== Trial ===
At the time of his trial, Mulka was 69 years old and married with a daughter and two sons. The court noted that he had played a major role in the transformation of Auschwitz from a concentration camp into an extermination complex from mid-1942, in the planning and construction of the four Birkenau crematoria and gas chamber complexes, and the selection of arriving transports of Jews on the Alte Rampe (old ramp) for extermination, respectively occurred and began during his tenure. In the trial, Mulka said the Auschwitz atmosphere disgusted him, stating that "the things that transpired there shocked me from the beginning". When asked to elaborate, he pointed to the striped prisoner uniforms, commenting that his SS colleagues had "no style".

Mulka was found guilty of aiding and abetting the murder of 750 people on at least four occasions, and was sentenced to 14 years in prison. In the conviction, the court noted that:

After weighing up all of these points, there is indeed a serious suspicion, that the accused, as adjutant, internally approved and willingly supported the mass murder of Jews, and therefore acted in mens rea; final doubts cannot be dispelled, however, that he saw to the smooth implementation of extermination operations more out of command loyalty and a misplaced sense of duty, therefore only facilitating and supporting the acts of the main perpetrators.

== Death ==
He attempted suicide while in Kassel prison, and was released in 1968 on compassionate grounds due to being severely ill, and died the following year in Hamburg, aged 74.

== Bibliography ==
- Langbein, Hermann. (2004) People in Auschwitz. University of North Carolina Press. ISBN 978-0-8078-2816-8
- Wittmann, Rebecca. (2005) Beyond justice: the Auschwitz trial. Harvard University Press. ISBN 978-0-674-01694-1
