= Politische Abteilung =

Department of Nazi concentration camps

The Politische Abteilung ("Political Department"), also called the "concentration camp Gestapo," was one of the five departments of a Nazi concentration camp set up by the Concentration Camps Inspectorate (CCI) to operate the camps. An outpost of both the Gestapo and the criminal police (Kripo), the political department evolved into the most important of the five.

== Background ==
Theodor Eicke was appointed by Reichsführer-SS Heinrich Himmler to establish a system to run the concentration camps. Eicke drew up regulations for guards and for prisoners and set up five departments to oversee the camp.

The five departments were:

Abteilung I: Command headquarters
Abteilung II: Political department
Abteilung III: Preventive detention camp
Abteilung IV: General administration
Abteilung V: Medical unit

As of summer 1936, the Politische Abteilung (Political department) was a compulsory part of the concentration camp command structure. Unlike the other departments, it was not under the Concentration Camps Inspectorate, but rather the local Gestapo office or after September 1939, Amt IV (Gestapo) of the Reich Security Main Office (RSHA). The department head and deputy were usually officers of the Gestapo or Kripo, or were members of the Sicherheitsdienst (SD). The other employees of the department were members of the Waffen-SS, technically also Gestapo officers, but as SS members, belonged to the Stabskompanie, the company attached to the command headquarters and thus to the disciplinary authority of the commandant and adjutant.

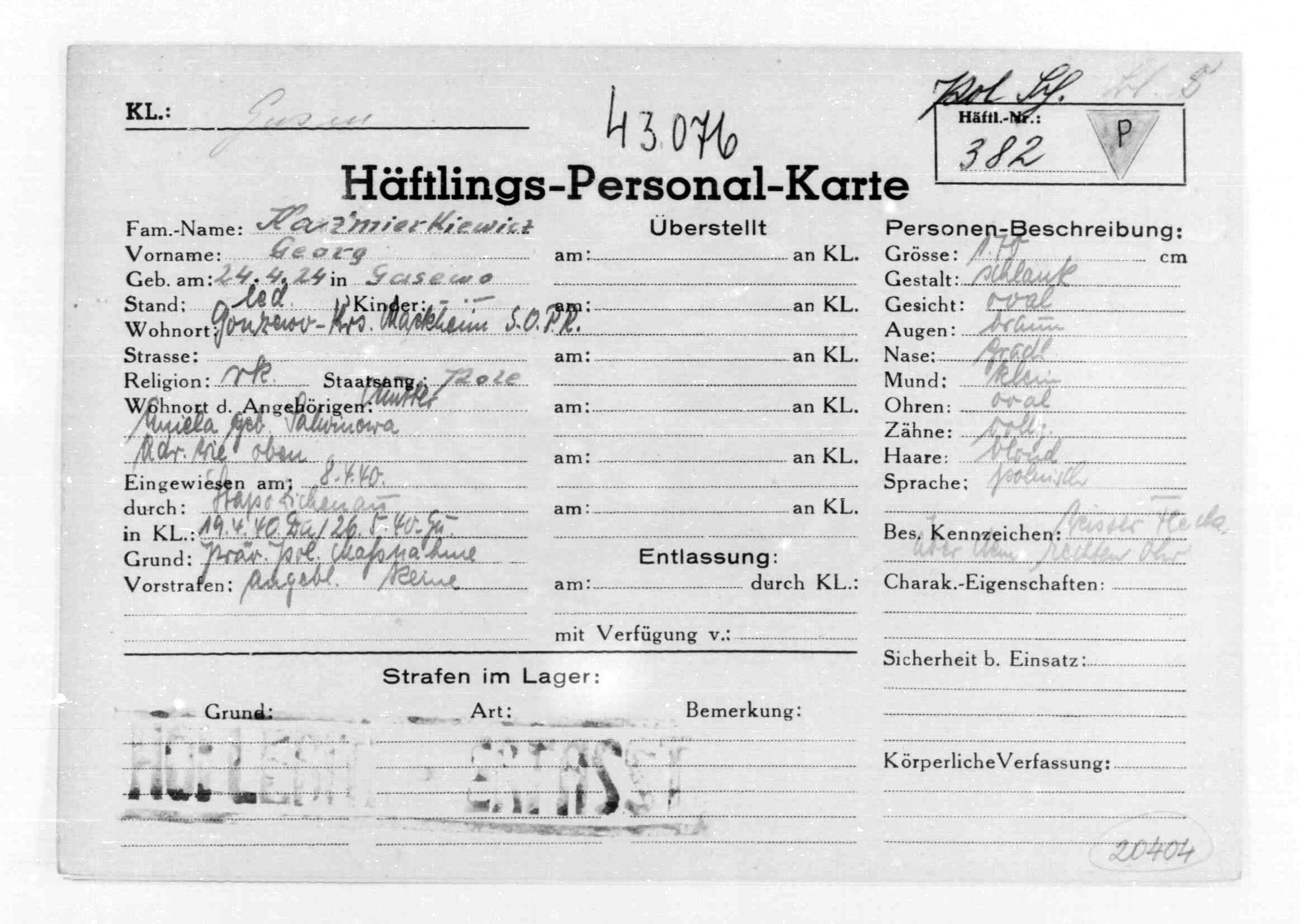
Prisoner file with note on penalties at the concentration camp

== Responsibilities ==
The Politische Abteilung was sub-divided into other five or six departments, which handled specific tasks. At Auschwitz, for example, the Politische Abteilung consisted of:

- Identification documentation
- Investigations
- Interrogations
- Intelligence service
- Surveillance
- Camp registrar (sometimes in conjunction with supervision of the crematorium)

The camp registrar handled the registration of prisoners when they were admitted and when they left, whether by release, transfer, escape or death. Inmate files were created, portrait photos made, physical description noted, brief details about the prisoner's life and fingerprints were filed.

The Politische Abteilung also handled the police work of the camps, again dividing up this work into specific subdivisions. The monitoring service prepared prisoner identification papers, another handled investigations and interrogations and a third handled prisoner surveillance. This included the fight against clandestine camp resistance groups, the prevention of escape. The department was known for its harsh interrogations, torture and executions and SS members of this department were feared by prisoners.

The department also handled correspondence with the Gestapo, Kripo and RSHA. For a prisoner, the political department could mean, within the grim world of a concentration camp, a relatively pleasant place to work, or it could mean torture and execution.

== Sources ==
- Buchheim, Hans (1968). "The SS – Instrument of Domination". In Krausnick, Helmut; Buchheim, Hans; Broszat, Martin; Jacobsen, Hans-Adolf (eds.). Anatomy of the SS State. New York: Walker and Company. ISBN 978-0-00211-026-6.
- Kirsten, Wolfgang. Das Konzentrationslager als Institution totalen Terrors. Centaurus, Pfaffenweiler 1992, ISBN 3-89085-649-7 (in German)
- Kogon, Eugen. Der SS-Staat. Das System der deutschen Konzentrationslager, first published by Alber, Munich (1946); republished by Heyne, Munich (1995) ISBN 3-453-02978-X (in German)
- Longerich, Peter (2012). Heinrich Himmler. Oxford and New York: Oxford University Press. ISBN 978-0199592326.
- Orth, Karin. Die Konzentrationslager-SS. dtv, München 2004, ISBN 3-423-34085-1 (in German)
