= German camps in occupied Poland during World War II =

Nazi German camps in occupied Poland during World War II
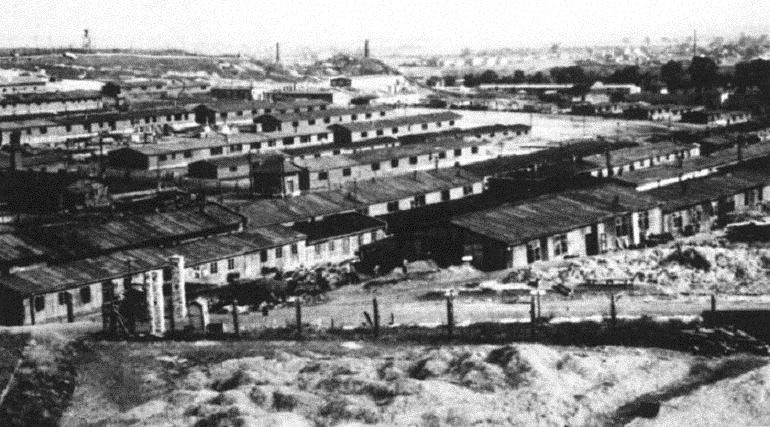
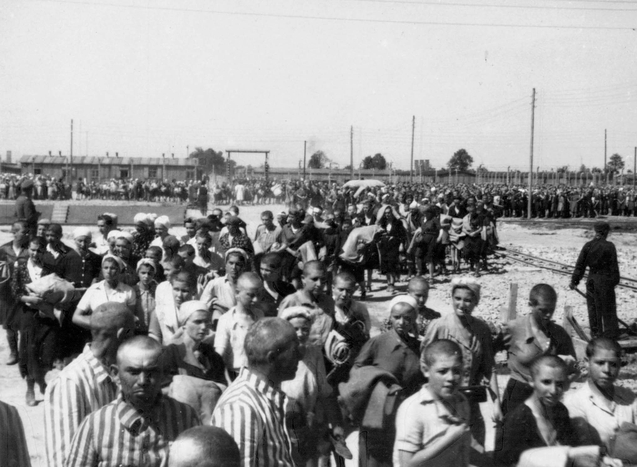
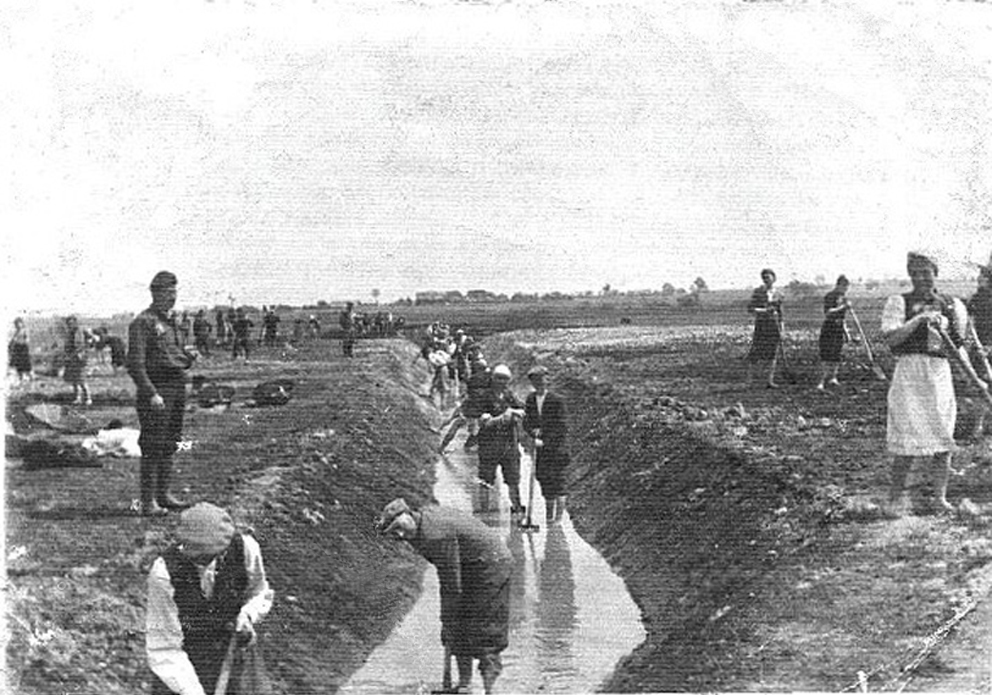
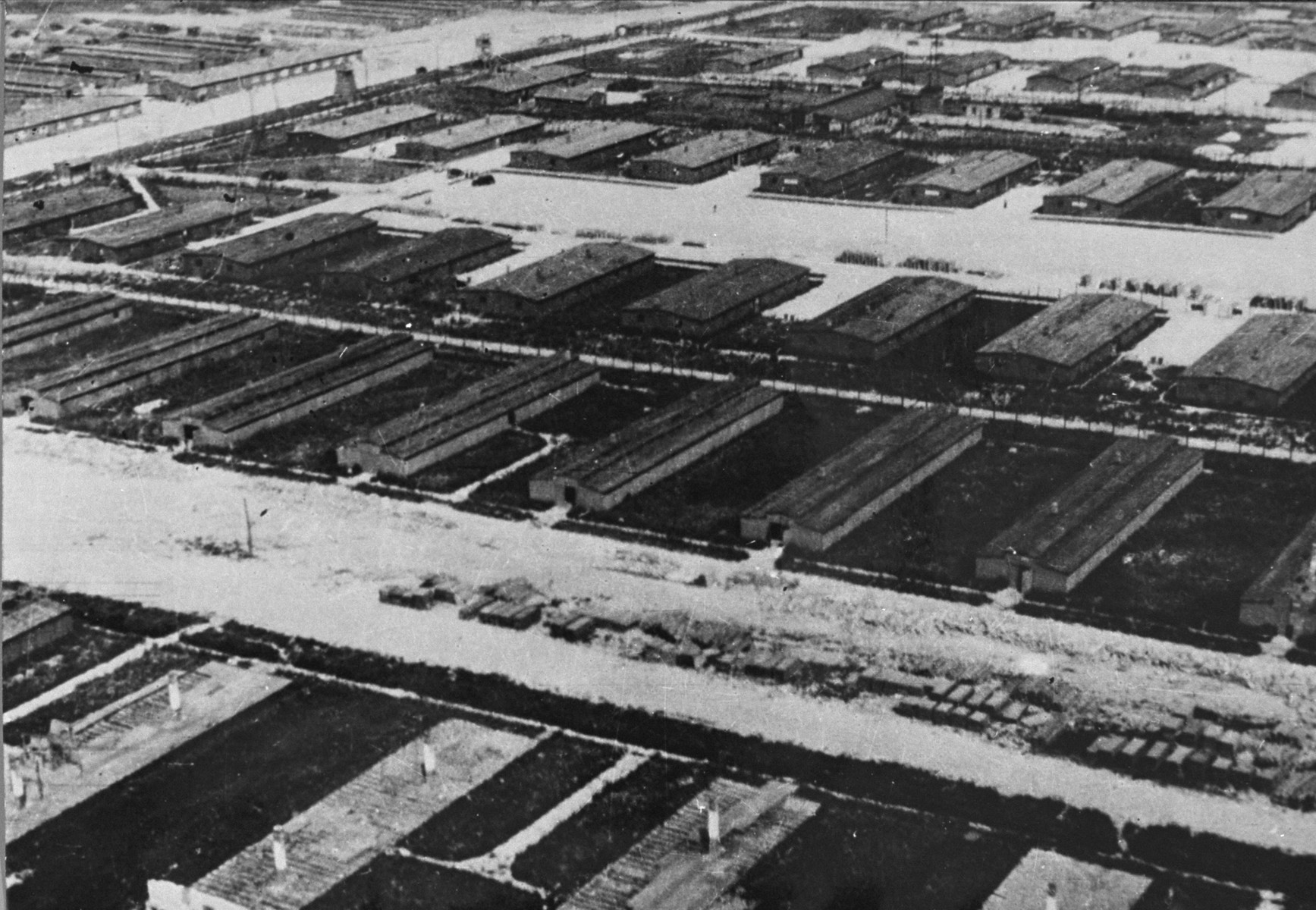
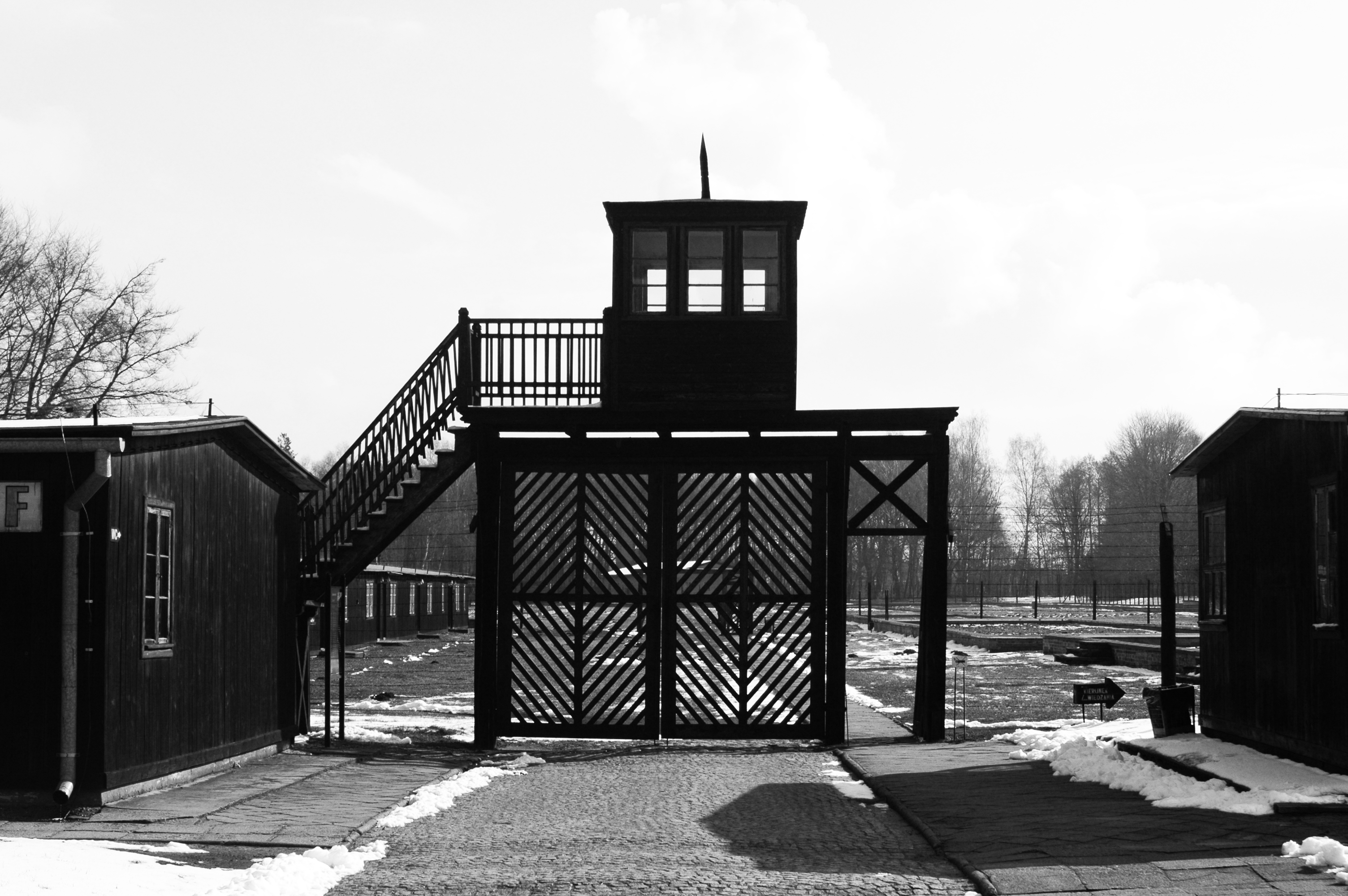
- Left to right (top to bottom): Concentration camp in Płaszów near Kraków, built by Nazi Germany in 1942 • Inmates of Birkenau returning to barracks, 1944 • Slave labour for the Generalplan Ost, making Lebensraum latifundia • Majdanek concentration camp (June 24, 1944) • Death gate at Stutthof concentration camp • Map of Nazi extermination camps in occupied Poland, marked with white skulls in black squares

Operation
- Period: September 1939 – April 1945
- Location: Occupied Poland

Prisoners
- Total: 5 million Polish citizens (including Polish Jews and Gypsies) and millions of other, mostly European, citizens

The German camps in occupied Poland during World War II were built by the Nazis between 1939 and 1945 throughout the territory of the Polish Republic, both in the areas annexed in 1939, and in the General Government formed by Nazi Germany in the central part of the country (see map). After the 1941 German attack on the Soviet Union, a much greater system of camps was established, including the world's only industrial extermination camps constructed specifically to carry out the "Final Solution to the Jewish Question".

German-occupied Poland contained 457 camp complexes. Some of the major concentration and slave labour camps consisted of dozens of subsidiary camps scattered over a broad area. At the Gross-Rosen concentration camp, the number of subcamps was 97. The Auschwitz camp complex (Auschwitz I, Auschwitz II-Birkenau, and Auschwitz III-Monowitz) had 48 satellite camps; their detailed descriptions are provided by the Auschwitz-Birkenau State Museum. Stutthof concentration camp had 40 subcamps officially and as many as 105 subcamps in operation, some as far as Elbląg, Bydgoszcz and Toruń, at a distance of 200 kilometres (120 mi) from the main camp. The camp system was one of the key instruments of terror, while at the same time providing necessary labour for the German war economy.

The camp system was one of the key instruments of terror, while at the same time providing necessary labour for the German war economy. Historians estimate that some 5 million Polish citizens (including Polish Jews) went through them. Impartial scientific research into prisoner statistics became possible only after the collapse of the Soviet Empire in 1989, because in the preceding decades all inhabitants of the eastern half of the country annexed by the USSR in 1939 were described as citizens of the Soviet Union in the official communist statistics.

== Overview ==
Before the September 1939 Invasion of Poland, the concentration camps built in Nazi Germany held mainly German Jews and political enemies of the Nazi regime. Everything changed dramatically with the onset of World War II. The Nazi concentration camps (Konzentrationslager, KL or KZ) set up across the entire German-occupied Europe were redesigned to exploit the labor of foreign captives and prisoners of war at high mortality rate for maximum profit. Millions of ordinary people were enslaved as part of the German war effort. According to research by the United States Holocaust Memorial Museum, Nazi Germany created some 42,500 camps and ghettos in which an estimated 15 to 20 million people were imprisoned. All types of confinement were used as a source of labour supply.

Between 1941 and 1943, the concerted effort to destroy the European Jews entirely led to the creation of extermination camps by the SS for the sole purpose of mass murder in gas chambers. During the Holocaust, many transit camps as well as newly formed Jewish ghettos across German occupied Poland served as collection points for deportation under the guise of "resettlement". The unsuspecting victims used to mistakenly perceive their own deportations as work summons. The Germans turned Auschwitz into a major death camp by expanding its extermination facilities. It was only after the majority of Jews from all Nazi ghettos were annihilated that the cement gas chambers and crematoria were blown up in a systematic attempt to hide the evidence of genocide. The cremation ovens working around the clock till November 25, 1944, were blown up at Auschwitz by the orders of SS chief Heinrich Himmler.

== Extermination camps ==
The vision of the Final Solution had crystallised in the minds of the Nazi leadership during a five-week period, from 18 September to 25 October 1941. It coincided with the German victories on the Eastern Front which yielded over 500,000 new POWs near Moscow. During this time, the concept of Hitler's Lebensraum was redefined. Different methods of industrial-scale murder were tested and the sites of the extermination camps were selected.

The new extermination policy was spelled out at the Wannsee Conference near Berlin in January 1942, leading to the attempt at "murdering every last Jew in the German grasp" thereafter. In early 1942 the German Nazi government constructed killing facilities in the territory of occupied Poland for the secretive Operation Reinhard. The extermination camps (Vernichtungslager) were added to already functioning extermination through labor systems, including at Auschwitz Konzentrationslager and Majdanek; both operating in a dual capacity until the end of the war. In total, the Nazi German death factories (Vernichtungs- oder Todeslager) designed to systematically murder trainloads of people by gassing under the guise of a shower, included the following:

German extermination camps in Poland
	Vernichtungslager	Nazi-delineated territory	Polish location	Holocaust victims
1	Auschwitz-Birkenau	Oberschlesien	Oświęcim near Kraków	1.1 million, around 90 percent Jewish.
2	Treblinka *	Generalgouvernement	80 km north-east of Warsaw	800,000–900,000 at Camp II (and 20,000 at Camp I).
3	Belzec *	Generalgouvernement	Bełżec near Tomaszów Lubelski	600,000 with 246,922 from General Government.
4	Sobibor *	Generalgouvernement	85 km south of Brześć nad Bugiem	200,000 (140,000 from Lublin and 25,000 from Lwów).
5	Chełmno	Reichsgau Wartheland	50 km north of Łódź	200,000 (most via the Łódź Ghetto).
6	Majdanek	Generalgouvernement	Lublin city district at present	130,000 per Majdanek State Museum research.
* Killing factories of secretive Operation Reinhard, 1942–43

The primary function of death camps was the murder of Jews from all countries occupied by Germany, except the Soviet Union (Soviet Jews were generally murdered by death squads). Non-Jewish Poles and other prisoners were also murdered in these camps; an estimated 75,000 non-Jewish Poles were murdered at Auschwitz-Birkenau. Most extermination camps had regular concentration camps set up along with them including Auschwitz-Birkenau, Majdanek, and Treblinka I. However, these camps were distinct from the adjoining extermination camps.

== Concentration camps ==
At the beginning of the war, the new Stutthof concentration camp near Gdańsk served exclusively for the internment and extermination of the Polish elites. Before long, it became a nightmare of Moloch with 105 subcamps extending as far as 200 kilometres south into the heartland of Poland and more than 60,000 dead before the war's end, mainly non-Jewish Poles. As far as forced labour, there was little difference between camp categories in Poland except for the level of punitive actions. Some camps were built so that the prisoners could be worked to death out of the public eye; this policy was called Vernichtung durch Arbeit (annihilation through work). Large numbers of non-Jewish Poles were held in these camps, as were various prisoners from other countries. Among the major concentration camps run by SS for the purpose of wilful killing of forced labourers, the most notable examples included the Soldau concentration camp in Działdowo, and the Kraków-Płaszów concentration camp made famous in the feature film Schindler's List and the Inheritance documentary.

The Gross-Rosen concentration camp located in Rogoźnica, Poland (part of the German Silesia in World War II), was surrounded by a network of 97 satellite camps (Aussenlager) populated with Polish nationals expelled from Nazi Wartheland in the process of ethnic cleansing. By October 1943, most inmates were Polish Jews including nearly 26,000 women. There were similar camps, built locally, at Budzyń, Janowska, Poniatowa, Skarżysko-Kamienna (HASAG), Starachowice, Trawniki and Zasław servicing Nazi German startups which ballooned during this period. War profiteers set up camps in the vicinity of the ghettos via Arbeitsamt, as in Siedlce, the Mińsk Ghetto (Krupp), and numerous other towns with virtually nothing to eat.

== War economy of Nazi Germany ==
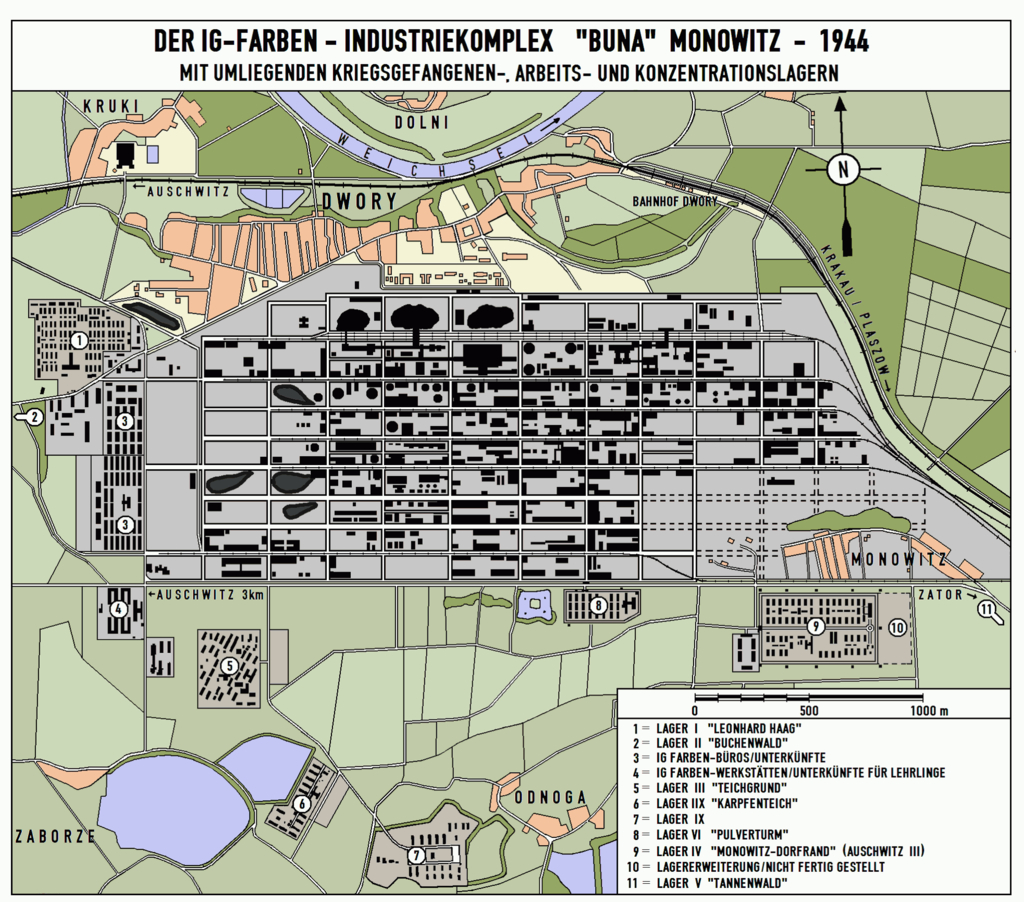
Birds-eye view of new IG Farben Buna-Werke industrial complex serviced by as many as 11 slave labour subcamps of Monowitz, one of three main camps of Auschwitz

Following the failure of the Blitzkrieg strategy on the Eastern Front, the year 1942 marked the turning point in the German "total war" economy. The use of slave labour increased massively. About 12 million people, most of whom were Eastern Europeans, were interned for the purpose of labour exploitation inside Nazi Germany. Millions of camp inmates were used virtually for free by major German corporations such as Thyssen, Krupp, IG Farben, Bosch, Blaupunkt, Daimler-Benz, Demag, Henschel, Junkers, Messerschmitt, Philips, Siemens, and even Volkswagen, not to mention the German subsidiaries of foreign firms, such as Fordwerke (Ford Motor Company) and Adam Opel AG (a subsidiary of General Motors) among others. The foreign subsidiaries were seized and nationalized by the Nazis. Work conditions deteriorated rapidly. The German need for slave labour grew to the point that even the foreign children have been kidnapped in an operation called the Heuaktion in which 40,000 to 50,000 Polish children aged 10 to 14 were used as slave labour. More than 2,500 German companies profited from slave labour during the Nazi era, including Deutsche Bank.

The prisoners were deported to camps servicing German state projects of Organization Schmelt, and the war profiteering Nazi companies controlled by SS-WVHA and Reichsarbeitsdienst (RAD) in charge of Arbeitseinsatz, such as Deutsche Wirtschaftsbetriebe (DWB), Deutsche Ausrüstungswerke (DAW), and the massive Organisation Todt (OT), which built Siegfried Line, Valentin submarine pens, and launch pads for the V-1 flying bomb and V-2 rocket, among other slave labour projects such as the SS Ostindustrie GmbH, or private enterprises making German uniforms such as Többens and Schultz.

=== Labour camp categories ===
The Germans pressed large numbers of Poles and Polish Jews into forced labour. The labourers, imprisoned in German Arbeitslager camps and subcamps across Poland and the Reich, worked for a broad range of war-related industries from armaments production and electronics to army uniforms and garments. At most camps, including Buchenwald, the Poles and Polish Jews deported from Pomerania and Silesia were denied recognition as Polish nationals. Their true numbers can never be known. Only 35,000 Poles who were still alive in 1945 came back to Poland and registered as Buchenwald survivors, others remained in the West.

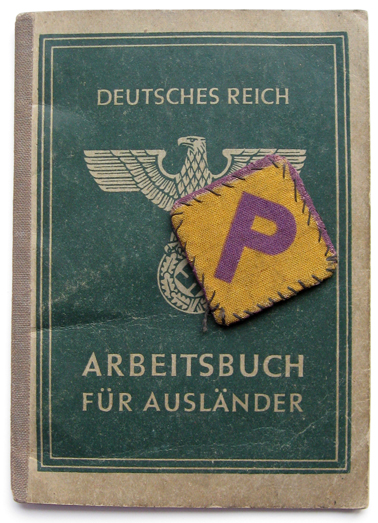
Arbeitsbuch Für Ausländer (Workbook for Foreigner) identity document issued to a Polish Forced Labourer in 1942 by the Germans together with a letter "P" patch that Poles were required to wear to identify them from the German population.

The Gross-Rosen population accounted for 11% of the total number of inmates in Nazi concentration camps by 1944, and yet by 1945 nothing remained of it due to death march evacuation. Auschwitz ran about 50 subcamps with 130,000-140,000 Poles on record, used as slave labour. Over half of them were murdered there; others were shipped to other complexes. There were hundreds of Arbeitslager camps in operation, where at least 1.5 million Poles performed hard labour at any given time. Many of the subcamps were transient in nature, being opened and closed according to the labour needs of the occupier. There were also around 30 Polenlager camps among them, formally identified in Silesia as permanent (see list) such as Gorzyce and Gorzyczki. Many of the 400,000 Polish prisoners of war captured by Germans during the 1939 invasion of Poland were also imprisoned in these camps, although many of them were sent as forced labourers to the heartland of Germany. Several types of labor camps in this category were distinguished by German bureaucracy.

1. Arbeitslager was general-purpose term for labor camps in the direct sense.
2. Gemeinschaftslager was a work camp for civilians.
3. Arbeitserziehungslager were training labor camps, where the inmates were held for several weeks.
4. Strafarbeitslager were punitive labor camps, originally created as such, as well as based on prisons.
5. The term Zwangsarbeitslager is translated as forced labor camp.
6. Polen Jugenverwahrlag were set up for Polish children hard to Germanize.
7. Volksdeutsche Mittelstelle camps for the actual, and the presumed ethnic Germans.

== Prisoner of war camps ==
The Germans established several camps for prisoners of war (POWs) from the western Allied countries in territory which before 1939 had been part of Poland. There was a major POW camp at Toruń (Thorn, called Stalag XX-A) and another at Łódź with hundreds of subsidiary Arbeitskommandos; Stalag VIII-B, Stalag XXI-D, plus a network of smaller ones including district camps. Many Soviet prisoners-of-war were also brought to occupied Poland, where most of them were murdered in slave labor camps. The POW camp in Grądy (Stalag 324) held 100,000 Soviet prisoners; 80,000 of them perished. The Germans did not recognise Soviets as POWs and several million of them died in German hands. They were fed only once a day, and the meal would consist of bread, margarine and soup.

== The victims ==
"The Mass Extermination of Jews in German Occupied Poland", by the Polish government-in-exile addressed to the wartime allies of the then-United Nations, 1942

The Polish nation lost the largest portion of its pre-war population during World War II. Out of Poland's pre-war population of 34,849,000, about 6 million – constituting 17% of its total – perished during the German occupation. There were 240,000 military deaths, 3,000,000 Polish-Jewish Holocaust victims, and 2,760,000 civilian deaths (see World War II casualties backed with real research and citations).

The Polish government has issued a number of decrees, periodically updated, providing for the surviving Polish victims of wartime (and post-war) repression, and has produced lists of the various camps where Poles (defined both as citizens of Poland regardless of ethnicity, and persons of Polish ethnicity of other citizenship) were detained either by the Germans or by the Soviets.

== Camps after the liberation ==
German camps were liberated by the Red Army and Polish Army in 1944 or 1945. A number of camps were subsequently used by the Soviets or Polish communist regime as POW or labor camps for Germans, Poles, Ukrainians, e.g.: Zgoda labour camp, Central Labour Camp Potulice, Łambinowice camp.

== Decrees of Polish Parliament ==
On 20 September 2001 the Sejm of the Republic of Poland introduced a special bill devoted to commemoration of Poland's citizens subjected to forced labour under German rule during World War II. The bill confirmed various categories of camp victims as defined during the founding of the Institute of National Remembrance (Dz.U.97.141.943), but most importantly, named every Nazi German concentration camp and subcamp with Polish nationals in them. The list was compiled for legal purposes as reference for survivors seeking international recognition and/or compensation action. It included Soviet and Stalinist places of detention as well. Among the Nazi German camps were 23 main camps with Polish prisoners, including 49 subcamps of Auschwitz, 140 subcamps of Buchenwald, 94 subcamps of KZ Dachau, 83 subcamps of KZ Flossenbürg, 97 subcamps of Gross-Rosen, 54 subcamps of KZ Mauthausen, 55 subcamps of Natzweiler, 67 subcamps of KZ Neuengamme, 26 subcamps of Ravensbrück, 55 subcamps of KZ Sachsenhausen, 28 subcamps of Stutthof, 24 subcamps of Mittelbau and others. Without exception, they were set up by the Germans for the abuse and exploitation of foreign nationals.

Naming of the camps by western media often cause controversies due to the usage of ambiguous phrase "Polish death camps" discouraged by the Polish and Israeli governments as loaded. All camps built in occupied Poland were German. They were set up during the reign of the Nazis over German-occupied Europe. Sporadically, the controversy is caused by the lack of sensitivity toward the history of the German occupation of Poland with comments made without awareness of the controversy.

== See also ==
- History of Poland (1939–45)
- The Holocaust in Poland
- Łapanka
- Potulice concentration camp
- Nazi crimes against ethnic Poles
- Operation Tannenberg
