= Poniatowa =

Town in Lublin Voivodeship, Poland

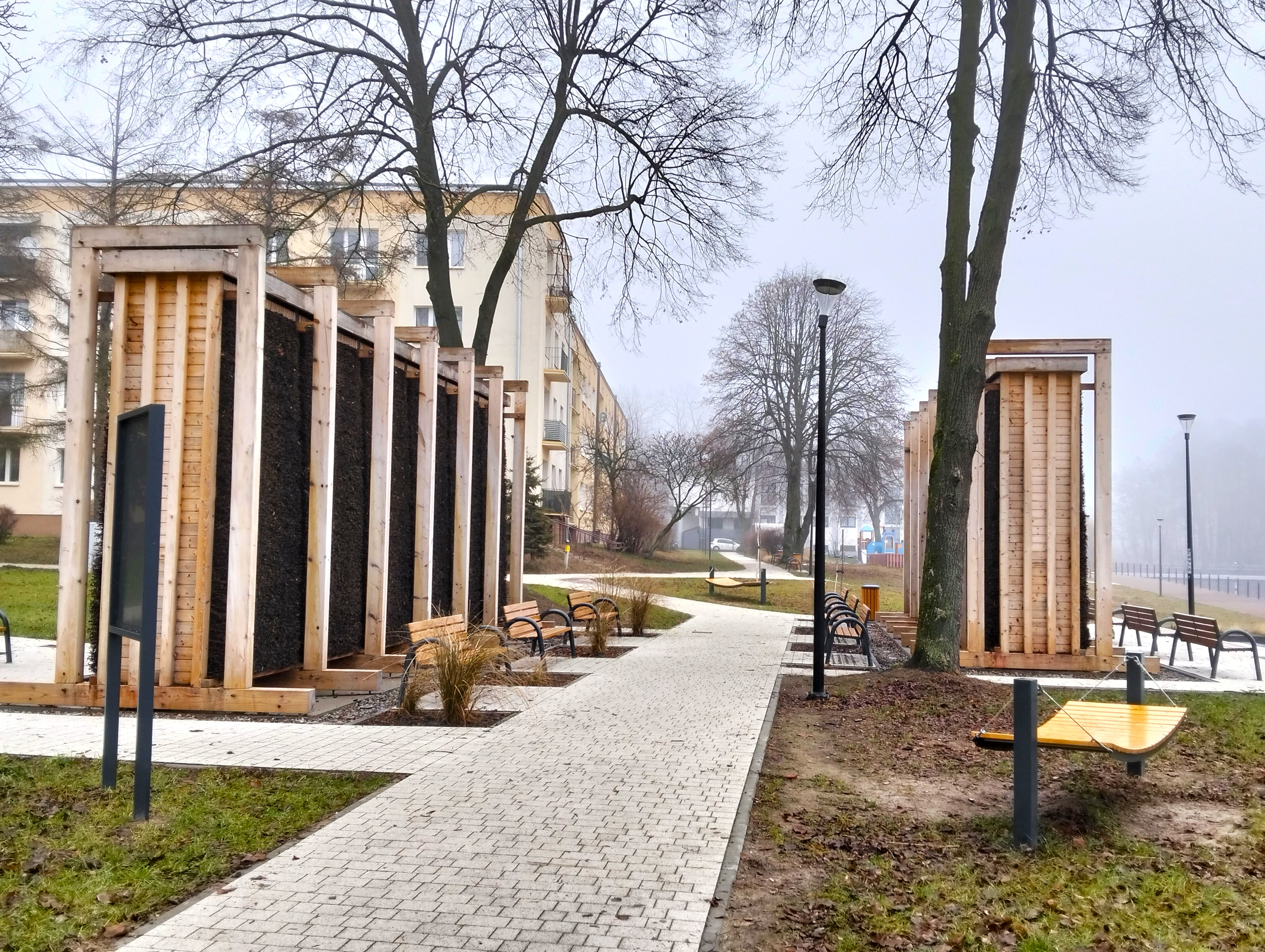
- Graduation towers in Poniatowa

- Coat of arms

- Location within Poland
- Coordinates: 51°11′34″N 22°03′53″E
- Country: Poland
- Voivodeship: Lublin
- County: Opole
- Gmina: Poniatowa
- Town rights: 1962

Government
  - Mayor: Paweł Kaczmarczyk (PiS)

Area
  - Total: 15.26 km^{2} (5.89 sq mi)

Population (2006)
  - Total: 9,911
  - Density: 649.5/km^{2} (1,682/sq mi)
- Time zone: UTC+1 (CET)
  - Summer (DST): UTC+2 (CEST)
- Postal code: 24-320
- Area code: 81
- Website: http://www.poniatowa.pl

Poniatowa [pɔɲaˈtɔva] is a town in eastern Poland, in Opole County, in Lublin Voivodeship, with 10,500 inhabitants (2006). It belongs to the historic region of Lesser Poland.

== History ==
=== Early history ===
Ciołek coat of arms of the Poniatowski family, from which the red bull's head of Poniatowa's coat of arms was derived

Exact date of establishment of Poniatowa is not known, however, it must have existed before 1382, because on September 2, 1382, the Starosta of Lublin issued a document co-signed by a man named Gotard, who was the owner of a village named Poniatowa. By the early 16th century, Poniatowa was under the authority of a Castellan from nearby Wąwolnica. It was administratively located in the Lublin Voivodeship in the Lesser Poland Province.

Poniatowa remained a village and belonged to the aristocratic Poniatowski family, which gave Poland its last king – Stanisław August Poniatowski. The family gave its name to the settlement, although by the time Poniatowskis got to prominence its members were living elsewhere. The village was in private hands until the mid-19th century. The Bull ("Ciołek" in Polish) which appears on the town's coat of arms is borrowed from one of the Poniatowskis heraldic designs. Poniatowa was annexed by Austria in the Third Partition of Poland in 1795. After the Polish victory in the Austro-Polish War of 1809, it became part of the short-lived Duchy of Warsaw, and after the duchy's dissolution in 1815, it became part of Russian-controlled Congress Poland.

=== 20th century ===
According to the 1921 census, the population of Poniatowa was exclusively Polish by nationality and Roman Catholic by confession.

The present town of Poniatowa was founded in the late 1930s, to house arriving workers of the new telecommunications equipment factory PZT (Zakłady Tele i Radiotechniczne - Filia nr 2), construction of which began in 1937. The factory was part of the Central Industrial Region, and was to supply radio equipment to the Polish Army. First buildings of the new town were put up in 1939, just before the outbreak of World War II and the German-Soviet invasion of Poland.

==== World War II ====
During the German occupation, the already erected factory was used by the Nazis to support the war effort using slave labor. Two construction specialists of the telecommunications equipment factory were murdered by the Russians in the Katyn massacre in 1940.

In the latter half of 1941 (following Operation Barbarossa), the Germans established the first camp for the Soviet POWs on the factory grounds. By mid-1942, about 20,000 Soviet prisoners had perished there. In April 1943, during the liquidation of the Warsaw Ghetto, about 15,000 Polish Jews – mostly tailors and seamstresses – were brought to the camp where, for the next six months, they worked as forced labour in war-supply workshops owned by German war profiteer Walter Caspar Többens from Hamburg. The Poniatowa camp facilities included a kitchen, medical room, a kindergarten where the children were kept while the adults and adolescents were making garments for the Wehrmacht. The entire workforce of the camp including 3,000 Slovak and Austrian Jews (the camp elite), were executed during the Operation Harvest Festival of November 4, 1943, into fake anti-aircraft trenches.

The monument in memory of the victims of the Holocaust was unveiled in Poniatowa on November 4, 2008, in the presence of the ambassador of Israel to Poland David Peleg, the ambassador of Austria, minister from the German embassy, minister from the Czech embassy, voivode of Lublin; the town's mayor, and many other officials, including Warsaw rabbi and priests.

Germans left Poniatowa in July 1944 ahead of the Soviet offensive.

==== Post-war period ====
After the war, in 1949, the industrial development of Poniatowa resumed with a reconstituted factory. As a result of the period of intensive growth after 1952, Poniatowa received town rights on July 18, 1962. In its heyday, during the Communist regime, the factory employed some 5,000 workers, about half of the town's population. It produced components for refrigerators and other household appliances. After the Fall of Communism and the subsequent free market reforms of 1989 the factory experienced economic difficulties, and in 1998 entered into bankruptcy. Presently, attempts are being made to attract new investors to take advantage of the factory's excellent infrastructure.

== Sports ==
The town has a sports club Stal Poniatowa, established in 1951.
