= Jewish Cemetery, Baligród =

Jewish cemetery in Baligród, Poland

Jewish Cemetery
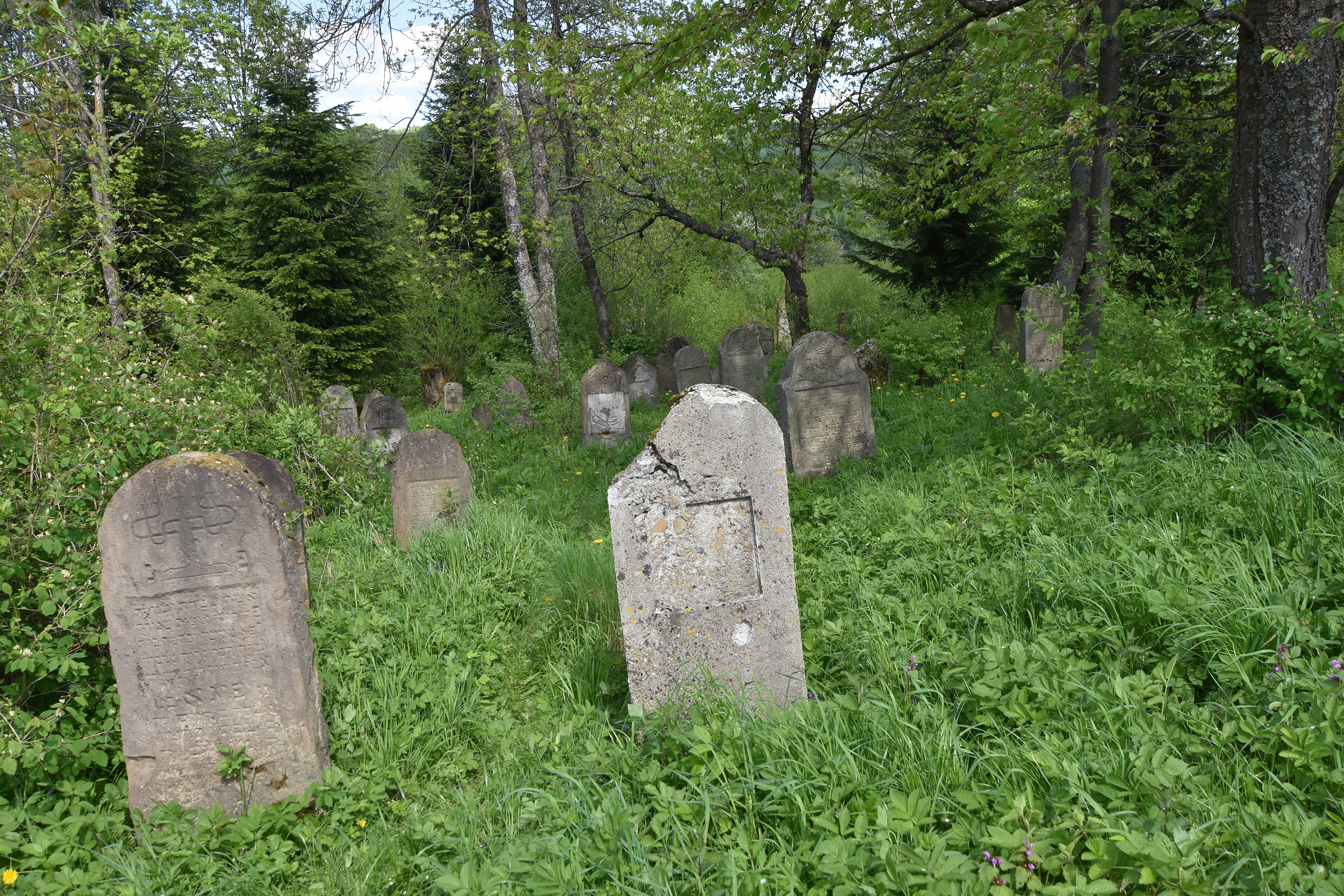
- General view of the Jewish cemetery in Baligród
- Interactive map of Jewish Cemetery

Details
- Established: First half of the 18th century
- Closed: 1942
- Location: Baligród
- Country: Poland
- Coordinates: 49°20′16″N 22°16′59″E
- Type: Jewish
- Owned by: Foundation for the Preservation of Jewish Heritage
- Size: 1 ha (2.5 acres)

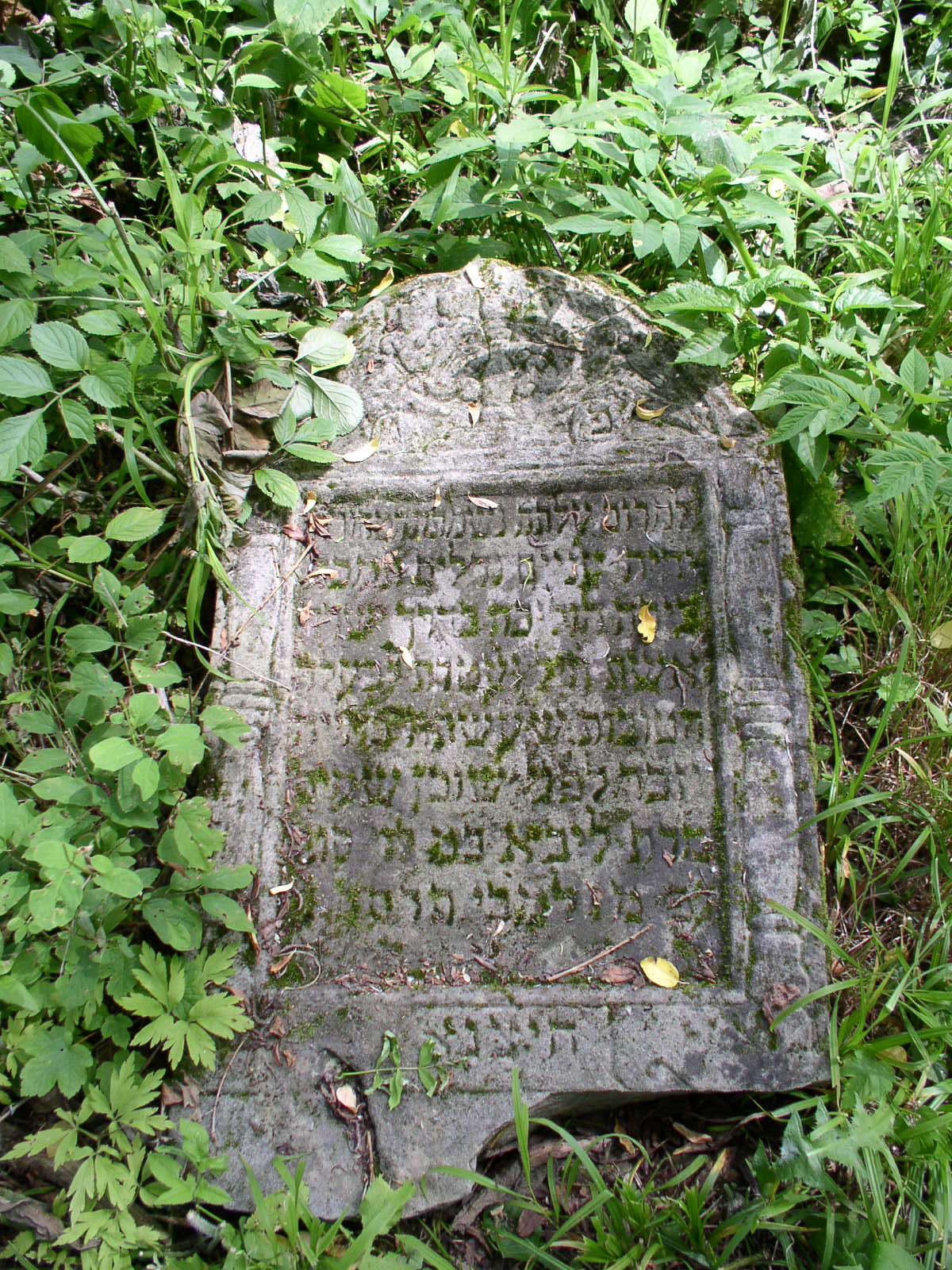
Gravestone from the early 20th century before renovation

The Jewish Cemetery in Baligród is a cemetery of the Jewish community that once inhabited Baligród and the surrounding villages subordinate to the Baligród qahal. It is located in the western part of the town on J. Duplaka Street. It was established in the first half of the 18th century. It was devastated by the Germans during World War II. After the war, it fell into disrepair while abandoned. In 1990, it was entered into the register of monuments.

== Location ==
The Jewish Cemetery in Baligród is situated northwest of the town market square, between 200 and 300 meters away, on J. Duplak Street. It has the shape of a pentagon close to a rectangle with one corner cut off. The area, according to various sources, ranges from 0.91 to 1 ha.

Currently unfenced, the cemetery stretches along a mountain slope on the southwest–northeast axis. To the north of the cemetery flows an unnamed stream, a tributary of the Hoczewka. In the lowest part of the cemetery, there was a pre-burial house before World War II.

== History ==
The Jewish Cemetery in Baligród was probably established in the early 18th century.

The establishment of the cemetery in Baligród is closely related to the existence of the local Jewish community, which emerged in the 18th century. The earliest mentions of Jewish settlement in Baligród date from 1605. At that time, however, before the independent community was formed, the Baligród Jews most likely buried their dead in the cemetery in Lesko, the town where the qahal to which they were subordinate was located. Only the establishment of an independent community allowed for the creation of the cemetery and the construction of the synagogue.

It is unknown whether the cemetery had its current boundaries and size from the very beginning, or whether, as in Lesko, new plots were gradually purchased and the cemetery expanded. The necropolis served not only the residents of Baligród but also the surrounding villages subordinate to the local qahal. The oldest tombstones are located in the lowest part of the cemetery.

During World War II, the Germans removed a large number of gravestones from the cemetery and paved the Baligród market square with them. After the deportation of local Jews to the Zasław concentration camp in the summer of 1942, Jews hiding in the area and Poles helping them were occasionally executed on the cemetery. The exact number of executions and victims is unknown.

== The cemetery in culture ==
The fate of the gravestones taken from the Baligród cemetery is mentioned in the novel Łuny w Bieszczadach by Jan Gerhard:

They climbed out one by one from the cramped cab. While Ciszewski retrieved his suitcase from the soldiers traveling under the canvas in the truck bed, Preminger stamped his numb foot. "Be careful, citizen major", the driver laughed, "you'll wake the Maccabees!" The major looked at him questioningly. He didn't understand the joke. "Look where you're dancing... These are gravestones". A grease-smeared finger pointed toward the ground. Preminger looked down. He was indeed standing on stone slabs with Hebrew inscriptions. "The Germans' work", the soldier explained, leaning comfortably on his elbow against the cab window. "They were going to pave the whole market with stones from the Jewish cemetery, but somehow they didn't manage or abandoned the project".

This scene was also depicted in the 1961 film The Artillery Sergeant Kalen based on motifs from the aforementioned novel, filmed partly in authentic Baligród locations.

== Present day ==
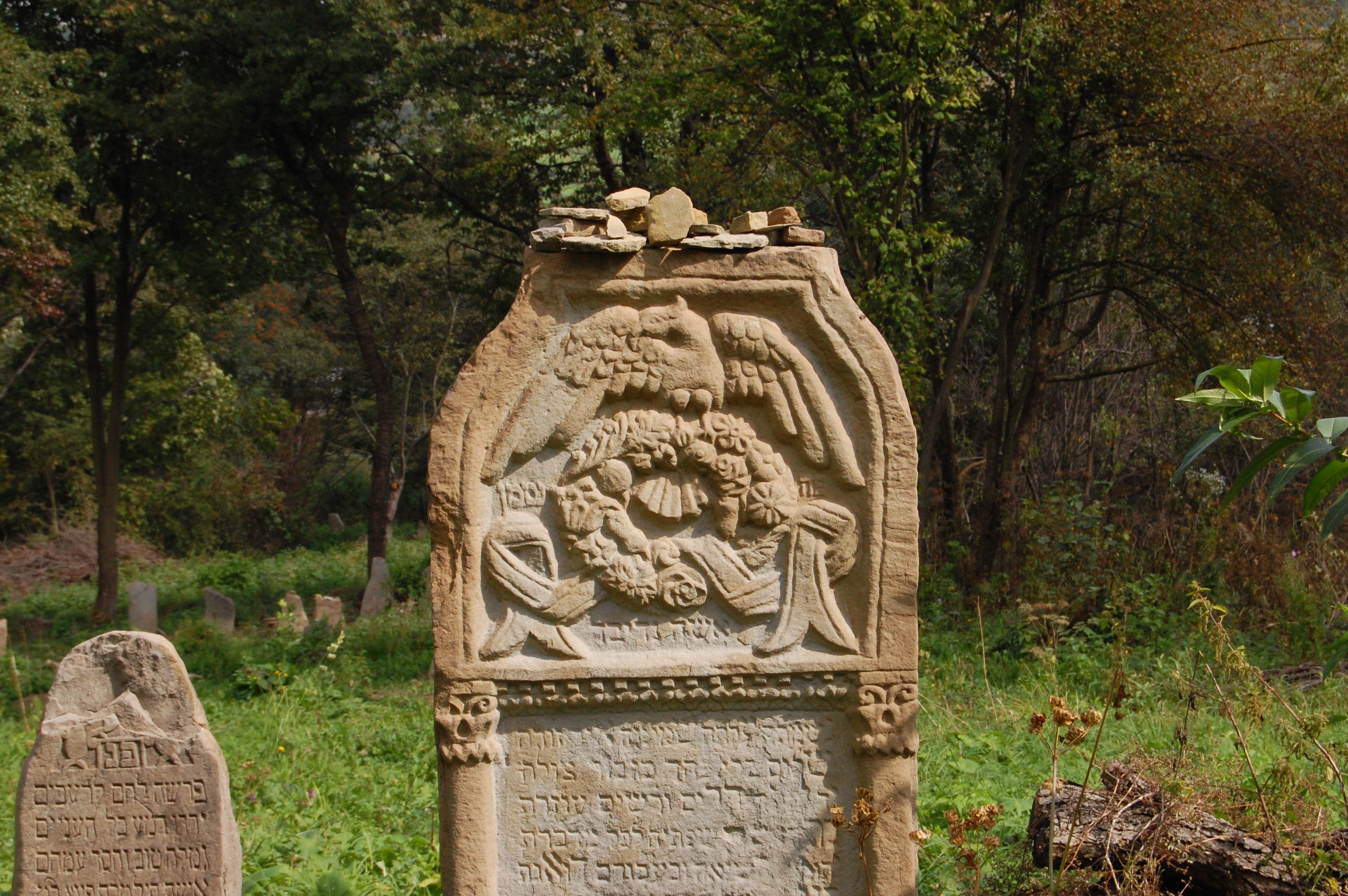
Richly carved gravestone in the Baligród cemetery

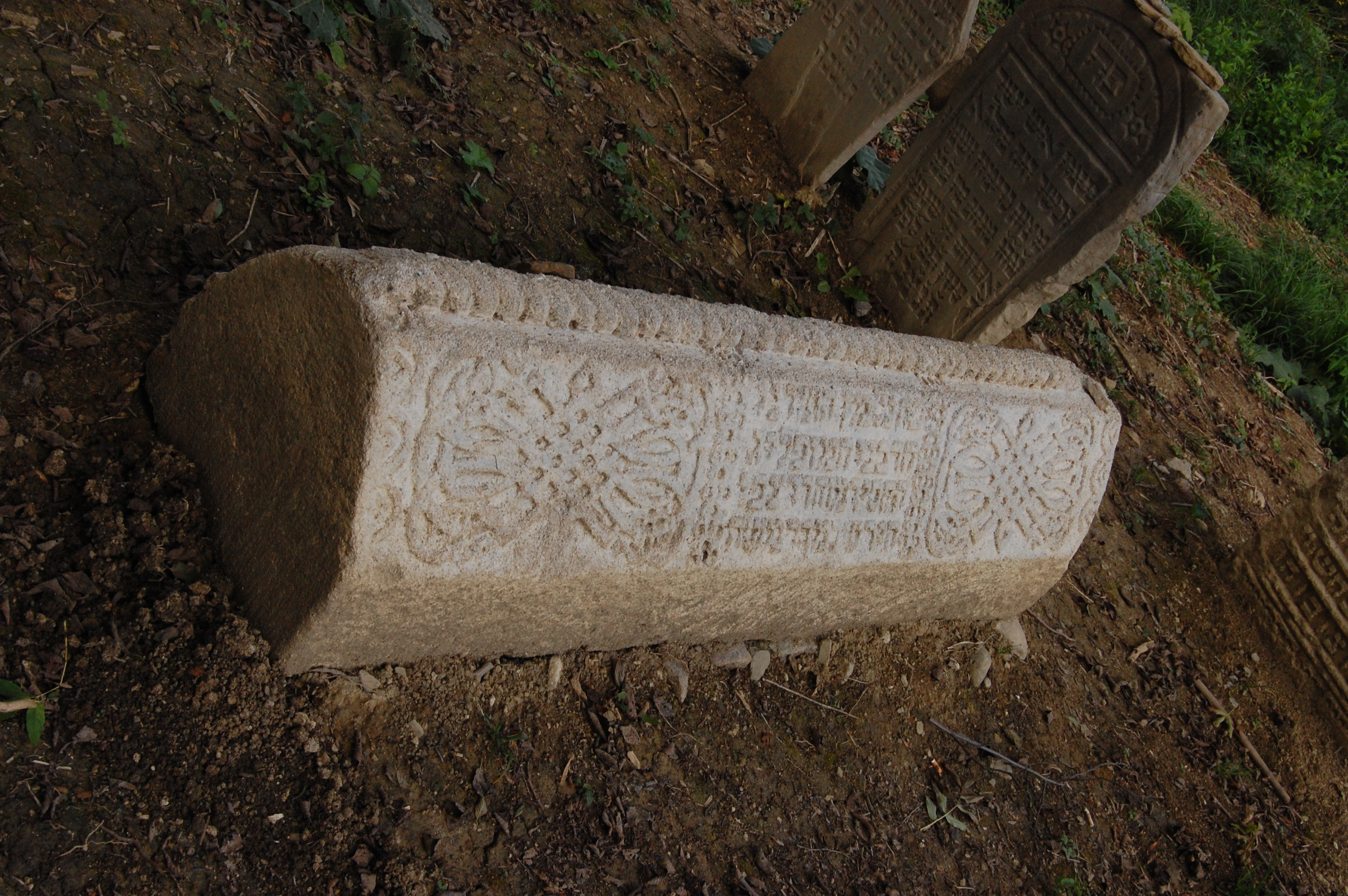
Rare tumb-style gravestone with a rare convex carved epitaph. Gravestone from the first half of the 18th century. On the one to the left, epitaphs are incised concave

After the end of World War II, with the destruction of the Baligród Jewish community, the cemetery was abandoned and fell into disrepair. There were cases of gravestone theft from the cemetery.

In 1990, the cemetery was entered into the NID register of monuments under number A−194 of 26 March 1990.

At the beginning of the 21st century, the cemetery's preservation improved significantly compared to earlier periods. Between 2005 and 2006, students from the middle school in nearby Mchawa, as part of the Przywróćmy Pamięć program run by the Foundation for the Preservation of Jewish Heritage, partially cleaned the cemetery. The initiative was continued by the Magurycz association, which from 2006 to 2010 cleared the vegetation overgrowing the cemetery and renovated the preserved tombstones. The association's activities were supported by Gmina Baligród, the Baligród Volunteer Fire Department, and the Baligród Forestry.

The number of preserved gravestones varies by source, indicating different maintenance states in various periods and occasional inability to notice some gravestones. Evidence of past neglect is also that, unlike the Lesko one, it was not recorded in guidebooks or on maps. The earliest sources mention about 50 gravestones, then about 100, but the latest information indicates about 150 preserved gravestones and about 100 fragments of destroyed gravestones.

Information on the oldest preserved gravestones also varies. Typically, dates of 1716 or 1718 are given. The oldest currently identified gravestones dates from 1731 and stands on the grave of Aharon, son of Israel. The cemetery has gravestones made of sandstone and limestone.
