= Józef Zwonarz =

Polish-Catholic ironworker

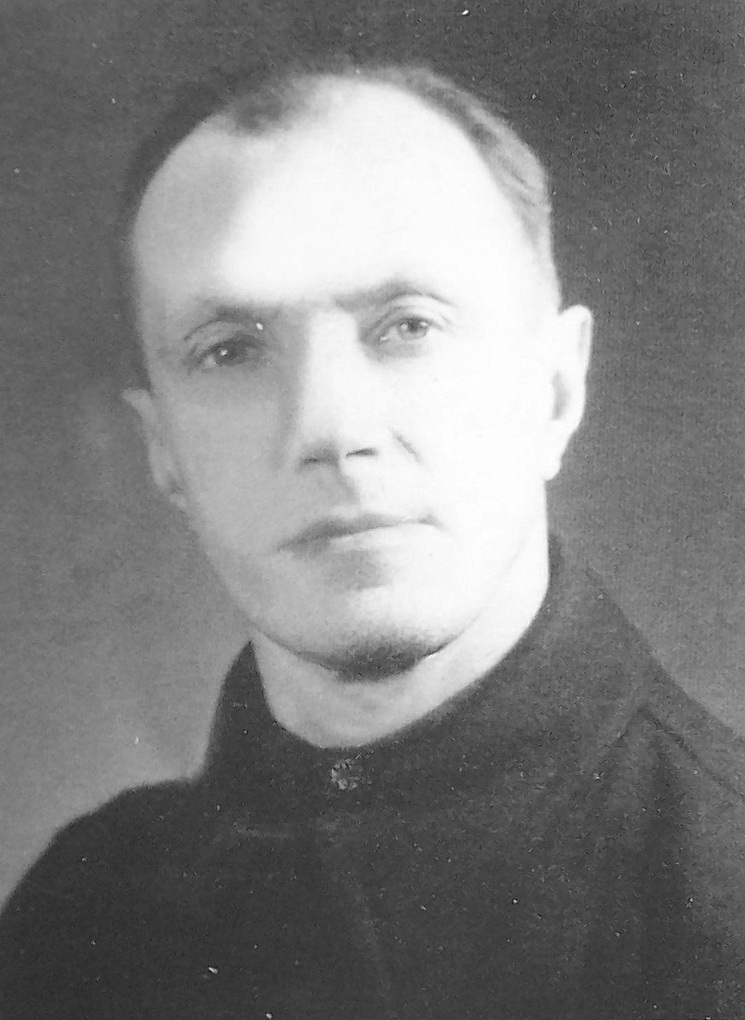
- Born: 11 March 1899; Stanisławów
- Died: 23 November 1984 (aged 85); Lesko
- Occupation: ironworker
- Spouse: Franciszka Zwonarz
- Children: Maria, Janina, Zofia, Franciszek, Helena, Romuald
- Parent(s): Adalbert, Weronika
- Honours: Righteous Among the Nations

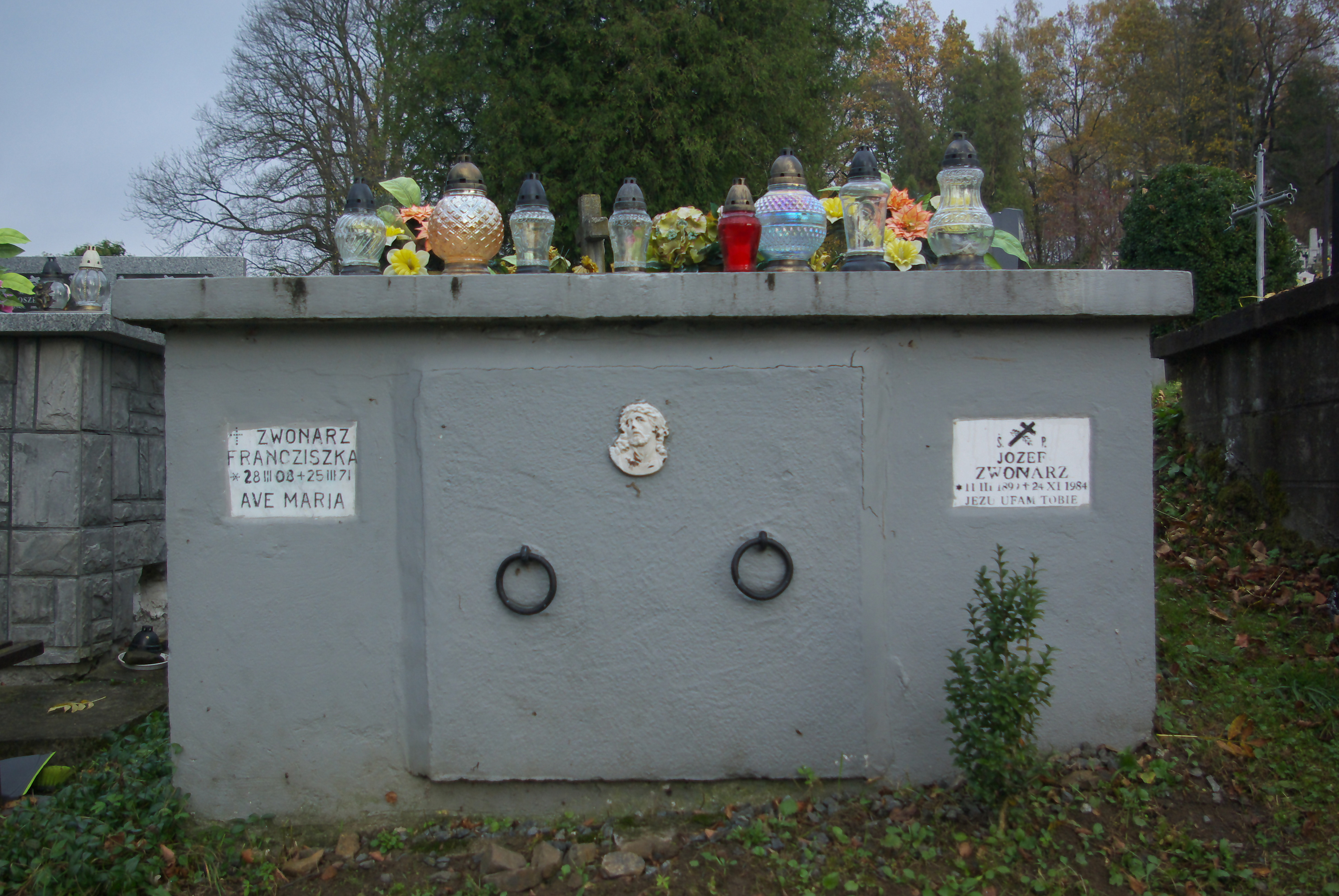
Tomb of Franciszka and Józef Zwonarz at Municipal Cemetery in Lesko

Józef Zwonarz (11 March 1899, in Stanisławów – 23 November 1984, in Lesko) was a Polish-Catholic ironworker of Hungarian descent from Lesko and one of many Righteous Gentiles who assisted persecuted Jews in spite of the penalty of death if they were caught doing so. Zwonarz housed a total of four Jewish adults in a cell under his small workshop. On the workshop's right boundary was the town’s Gestapo headquarters. On its left boundary were the Schutzpolizei. Across the road were the Ukrainian police.

He spent part of his youth in Budapest. He was a soldier of Austro-Hungarian Army during the World War I. Following regaining independence by Poland in 1918, he joined the Polish army and took part in Polish-Soviet War in 1920, and 1939 Defensive War. Between the wars, he worked as a mechanician in Lesko. In 1923, he became footballer of local team Sanovia.

After 1939 he was engaged in Polish resistance movement. In July 1942, Zwonarz was approached by a Jewish doctor, Nathan Wallach, whose wife Jafa was acquainted with Zwonarz, about taking their three-and-a-half-year-old daughter under his care. Zwonarz agreed to do so, and immediately found accommodation for the little girl with another non-Jew by the name of Jan Kakol. Soon after their daughter was moved, Dr. Wallach and his wife were transferred to the Zaslaw labour camp, as they were amongst the many Jews being liquidated from the Lesko ghetto.

On 16 December 1942, Wallach's wife was amongst 400 women scheduled to be executed in the main square of the labour camp. The women were lined up and most machine-gunned to death. She was not hit and was able to lay motionless and literally "play dead" until it was safe for her to move. She found her husband and they escaped, unnoticed, from the camp. The following day, the Wallachs arrived back in Lesko and again asked Zwonarz for help. Zwonarz, who was aged 45 at the time, an engineer by profession, and father of five children, now resolved to help Dr. Wallach and his wife just as he had helped their daughter.

Fearing that his wife and children may accidentally say something about the Wallachs to the surrounding authorities, Zwonarz decided to keep the existence of the Wallachs (and two other Jews that would soon join them) a secret from his wife and children. In order to do this, he set up an underground shelter (which its occupants would come to call “the tomb”) beneath his small workshop, located at the rear of his property. In this "tomb", which measured 5 feet by 3.5 feet and was about 3 feet deep (1.54x1.07x0.92m), the four Jews survived on nothing but water, potatoes, scraps from Zwonarz’s meals, and occasionally some barley for over two years. Zwonarz even went to the trouble of installing an electricity wire, connected to the main city circuit (so it would not show any extra kilowatts on his meter), to run some cooking appliances and a light-bulb in the pit. Noticing all his additional comings and goings, as well as missing food and cotton, Zwonarz's wife, Franciszka Zwonarz (née Jodłowska), concluded he was having an affair. Unfortunately for Zwonarz, he could not contradict any of what his wife had said for fear of incriminating himself, his family and the Jews he was sheltering. It was only in 1944, when the advancing Russian Army drew nearer to Lesko and he had to move the Jews into the cellar beneath his house after they were nearly killed in the pit by Russian shelling, that he was forced to tell his wife the truth. They stayed in the cellar for six weeks until the Russians had liberated the town.

After the liberation of Lesko, and when the Jews had regained enough strength to leave, they left and excused themselves for not being able to pay him for his trouble and expenses. Zwonarz responded by giving them his last items of worth, a wristwatch and a $10 bill, saying: "Take this, it's all I have. You'll need it to start a new life."

In 1967, Zwonarz and his wife Franciszka Zwonarz were honoured with the medal Righteous Among the Nations.

In 2006, Franciszka and Józef Zwonarz were included in survivor Jafa Wallach memoirs Bitter Freedom. Memoirs of a Holocaust Survivor.
