= Baligród =

- Village
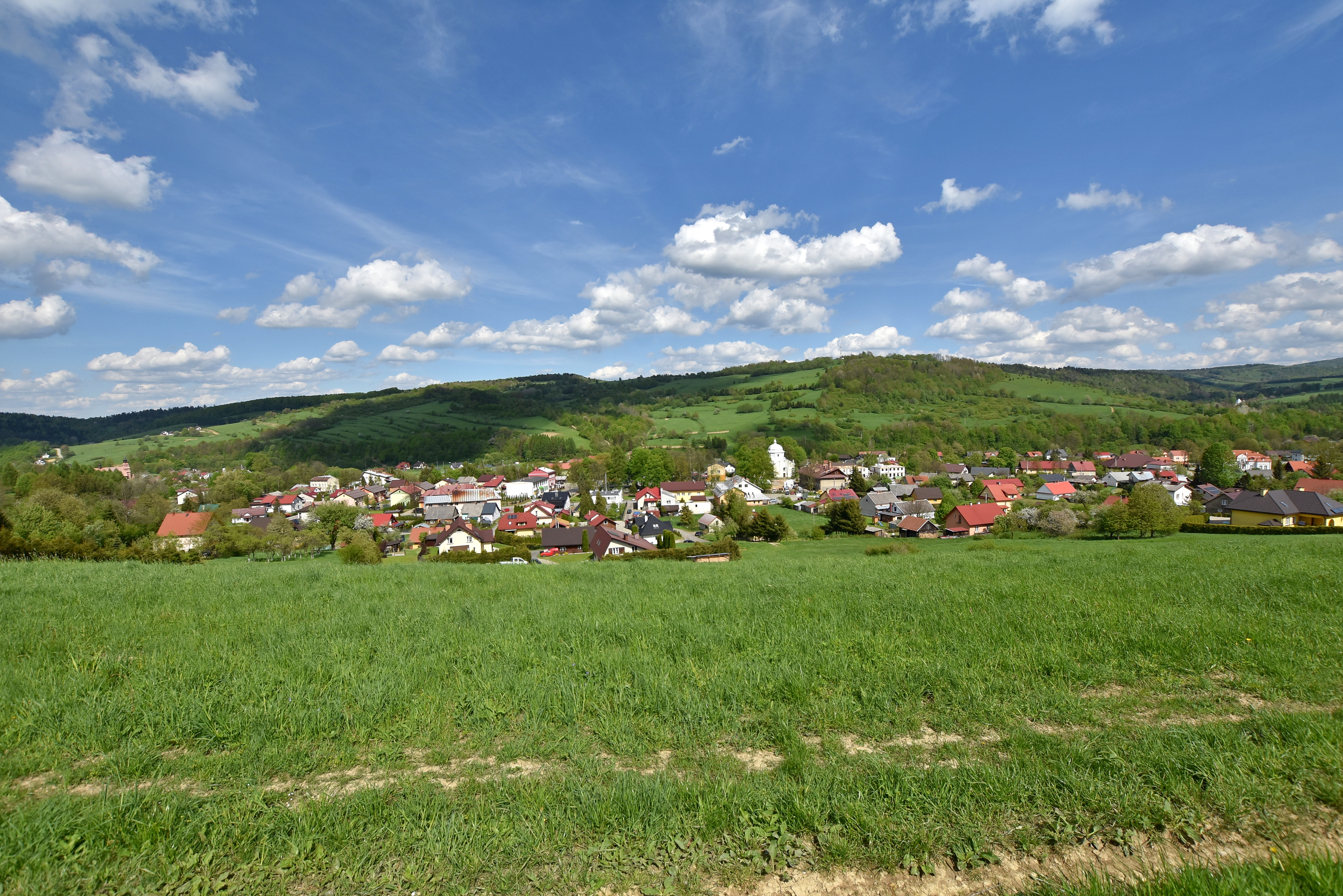
- Panorama of Baligród

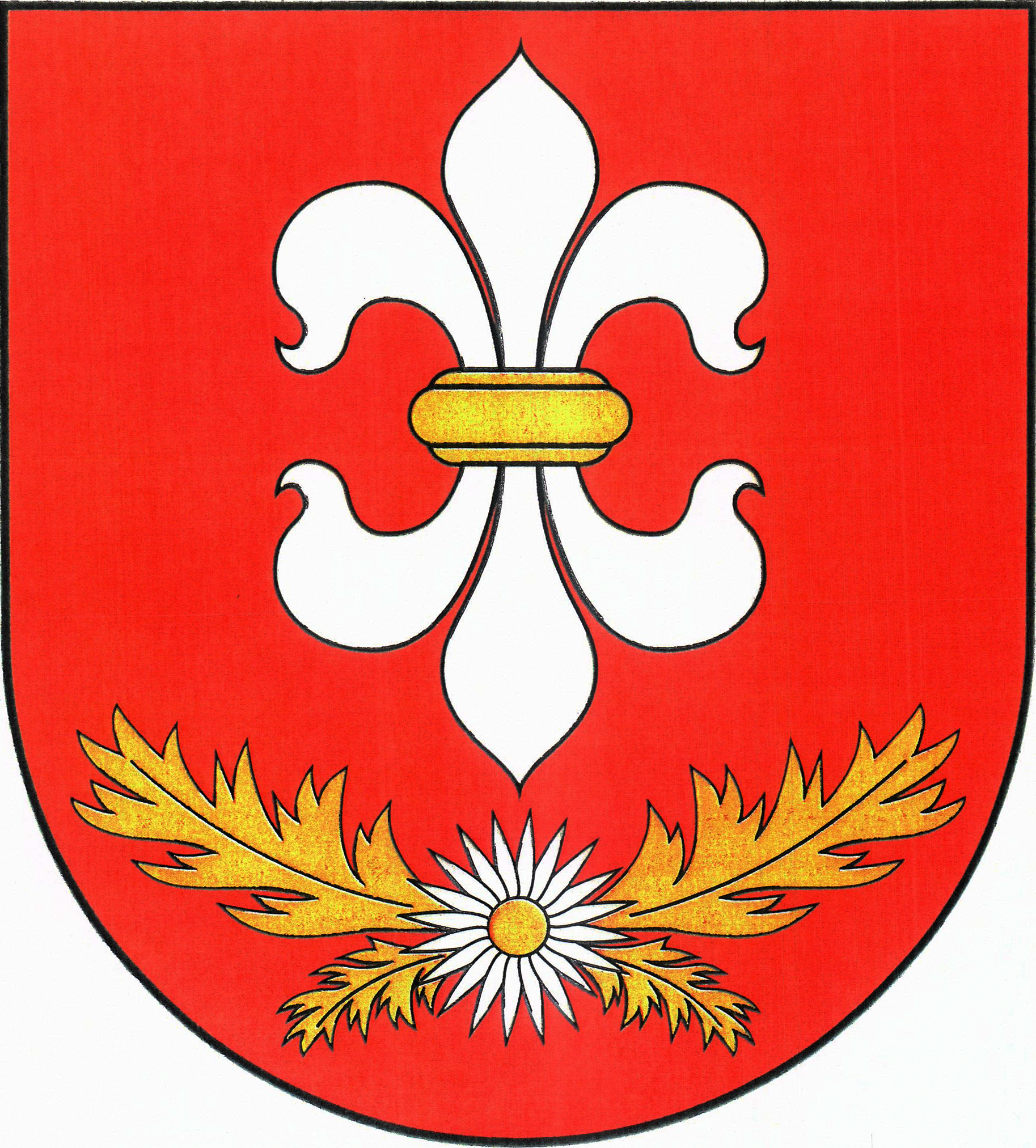
- Seal

- Location within Poland
- Coordinates: 49°20′10″N 22°17′13″E
- Country: Poland
- Voivodeship: Subcarpathian
- County: Lesko
- Gmina: Baligród
- Founded: 1615

Area
  - Total: 68.8 km^{2} (26.6 sq mi)
- Elevation: 340 m (1,120 ft)

Population
  - Total: 1,468

Baligród [baˈlʲiɡrut] is a village in Lesko County, in the Subcarpathian Voivodeship (province) of south-eastern Poland. It is also the seat of the municipality (gmina) called Gmina Baligród. From 1 January 1999 until 1 January 2002 it was located in Bieszczady County.

== History ==
=== Establishment and growth ===
Baligród, previously called Balówgród is a village situated in the valley of the Hoczewka river near the Bieszczady mountains. The settlement was founded in the early 17th century by Piotr II Bal. A castle was built between 1600–1615, defended on three sides between the Hoczewka and Stężnicki streams. The existence of the town in this period is corroborated through a document that was issued by Władysław IV Vasa, and given to Piotr's son Adam in 1634.

Public buildings were constructed as the town grew. In 1808, a public baths and almshouse were established. In 1855 the first post office of Baligród was built, and in the same year the Baligród court district was created. A public school was established in 1862 and by 1879, a church had been built.

Baligród was inherited by Piotr's son, Stefan Bal. After Stefan, it passed down to Stefan's son Jon, who contributed to Baligród's economic boom as the town became a popular wine market. Salomea Bal Karsziniki, Jon's daughter, was the last of the Bal family line to own the town as her son Andrew Karsznicki inherited the town after her. In 1879 Hersch Grossinger, a Jewish settler, purchased Baligród for 50,000 zlotys.

==== Economy ====
Baligród's economy was at this time driven largely by farming and cattle breeding, and as a result these were the main occupations for locals. The town's farm listing for 1870 included 50 horses, 166 oxen, 117 cows, 63 sheep, and 63 pigs. Other industries included sawmills, a mill, smithy, bakery, craftsmen, tailors, and shoemakers.

In 1634 the town received Magdeburg rights and privileges allowing the townspeople to host markets, fairs, and wine storage. Due to Baligród being situated on the trade route to Hungary, opportunities for greater economic development grew. As markets were increasing in popularity, a regular market was held in the town on Mondays where Hungarian wine, wax, honey, leather, wool, and linen was sold. However, when the town began to decline in 1915, Baligród lost its municipal rights.

=== Jewish Community ===
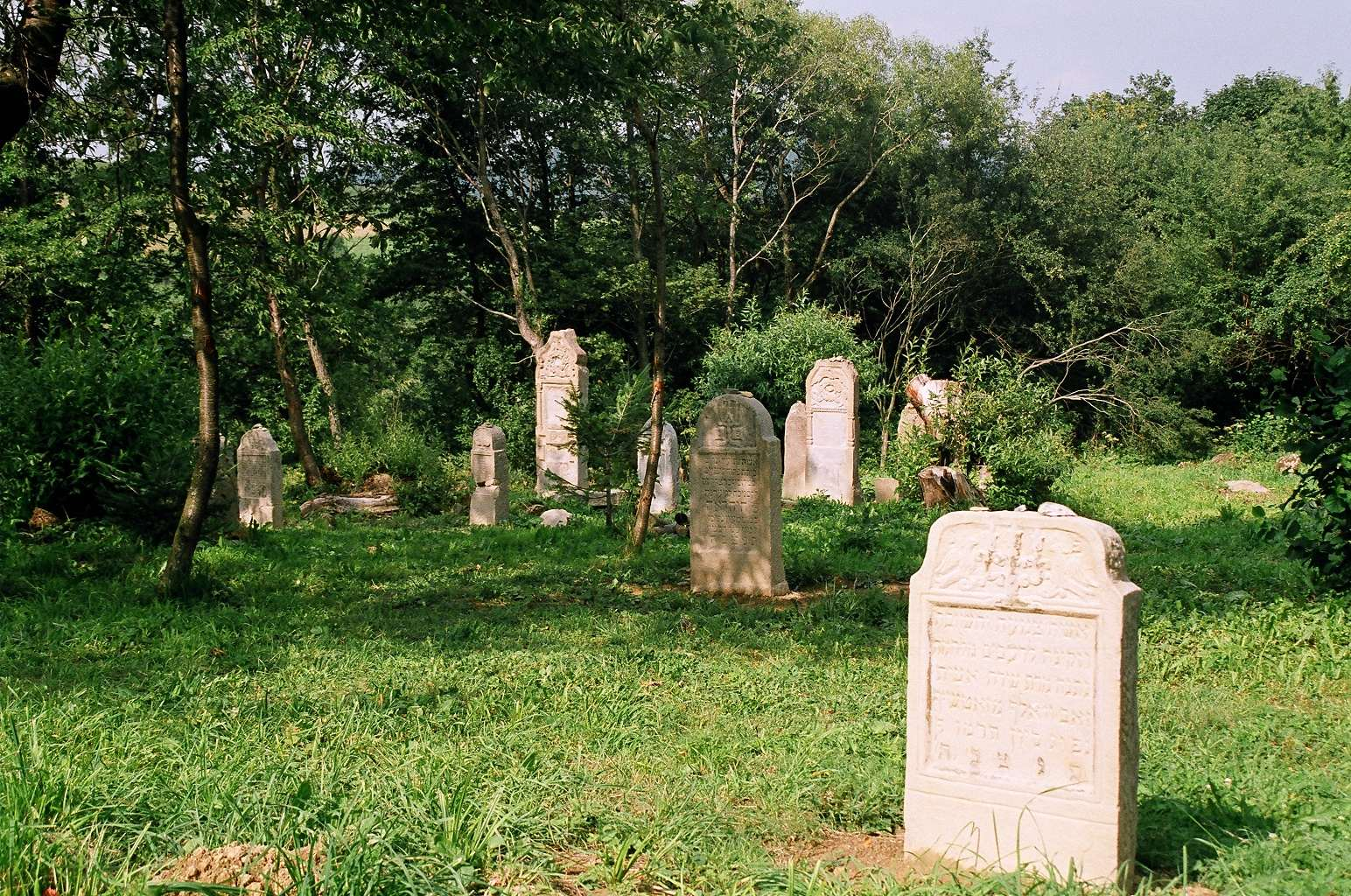
Remains of the Jewish Cemetery

Jews living in Baligród date back to near the town's emergence. A Jewish man under the name Zelman lived in the area of Woronikowka dating back to 1605 in historical records. Up until the end of the 18th century, the Jewish population of Baligród most likely worked with the Jewish Cooperative of Lesko, a Jewish Community in a larger town near Baligród. The Jews of Baligród were an average shtetl (Jewish village) that was composed of different shuls. Overall within the community, there were many young and sophisticated people. Hasidism dominated in the shtetl, but there were other beliefs including Prominent Judaism, Talmidei Chachamim, and Pious Judaism.

The first synagogue in Baligród was built near the beginning of the 18th century, even though the first records of the Jewish Community existing were not written until 1870. A second synagogue was built around the 19th century which was located in the northwest corner of the main square that had led to the cemetery. The Jewish Community of Baligród had its own cemetery and religious school, with approximately 40 students enrolled.

Most Jewish families made a living off of trade and craft, especially in the market days. They owned 52 stores, taverns, and inns throughout Baligród.

Jewish Population in Baligród
Year	Population Number
1710	148
1764	144
1784	400
1870	435 (147 families)
1880	564
1900	988
Pre WWI	1100
1921	515
Pre WWII	990

=== World War I ===
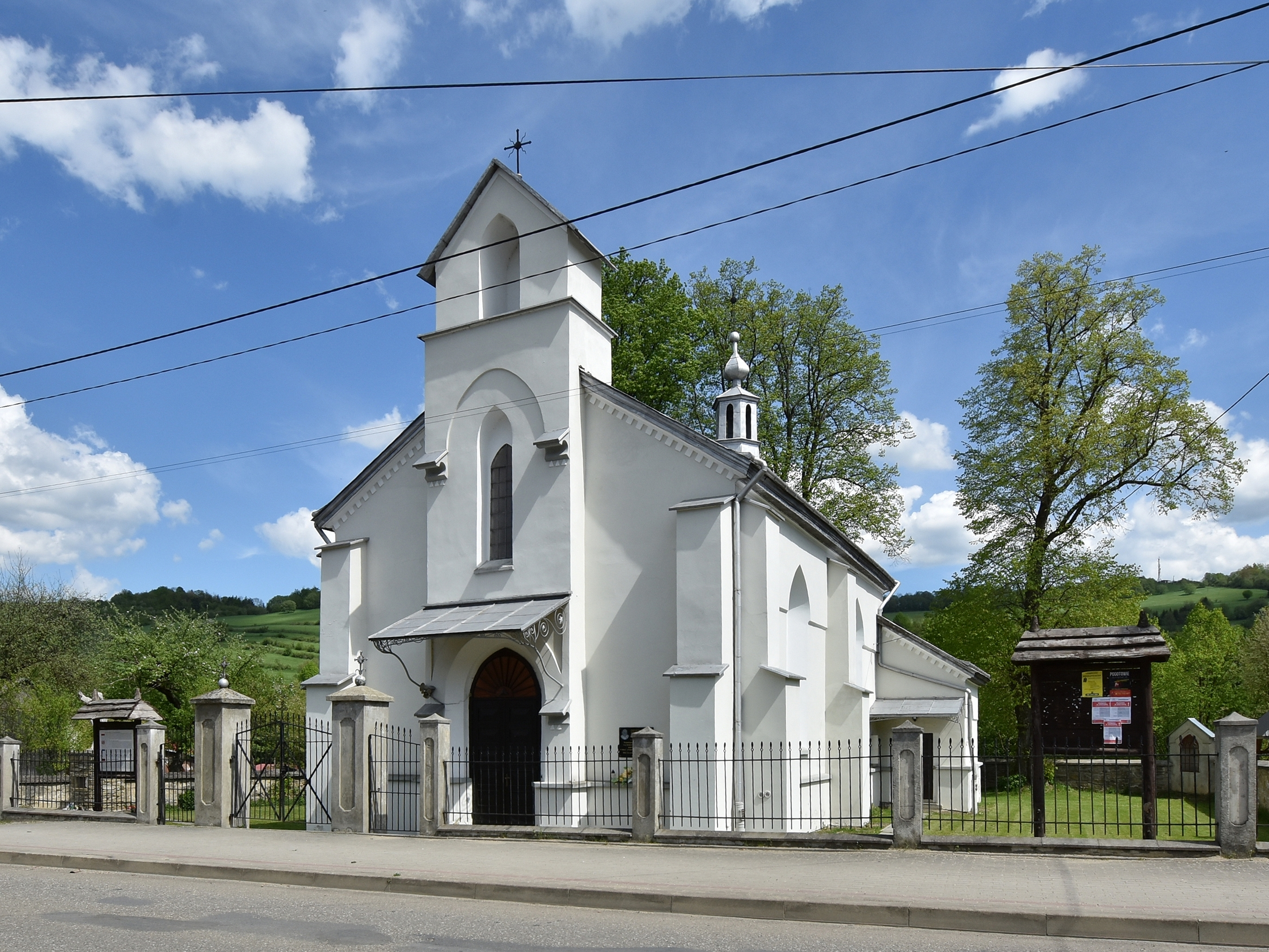
Catholic church

From January to March 1915, Baligród was in the midst of the Carpathian Campaign of World War I, fought between the Russian and Austro-Hungarian armies. Due to the danger imposed by the fighting, the city saw mass emigration continuing into the post-war period.

=== Interwar period ===
After the war, Zionist clubs were established in Baligród.

=== World War II ===
The Invasion of Poland at the beginning of World War II saw Slovakian and German troops occupy the city by September 10, 1939. Occupying forces would open a police station for the Gestapo and an Arbeisamt (administration) in the area. Ukrainians took over the Jewish school building, which became their own school. This resulted in Polish citizens having to seek schooling in the more impoverished areas of the city.

During the occupation, Baligród became a gathering area for surrounding villages near the Bieszczady Mountains—including Solina, Wołkowyja, and Zawóz. It was also the site of the Baligród massacre, during which soldiers of the Ukrainian Insurgent Army targeted and murdered Polish civilians.

In the summer of 1942, 1200 local Jews were sent to the Zasław concentration camp and later to the Belzec extermination camp. The main synagogue was burned down by the Germans and its ruins dismantled after the war. The Jewish Cemetery, which had served as a place of execution of Jews and Poles, was also destroyed and roads were paved with tombstones. In the autumn of 1942, Germans had taken 880 Jews to Załawie and killed them.

=== Post-war ===
Between 1944 and 1946, members of the Ukrainian minority in Poland were forcibly repatriated from Poland to the Soviet Union. On March 28, 1947, Polish General Karol Swierczewski was killed nearby on a road to Cisna, close to Jablonki, by members of the Ukrainian Insurgent Army. In 1947, the People's Republic of Poland conducted Operation Vistula in an effort to eliminate the Ukrainian Insurgency's support base in Baligród. The remnants of the region's Ukrainian population were relocated to the Recovered Territories.

=== Emigration and Decline ===
The first major decrease in the population of Baligród occurred in the 1720s after The Great Northern War had caused large amounts of damage throughout the town. The next large decrease in population had occurred during and after World War I as they were caught in the middle of a war zone between two opposing armies, a situation that caused great destruction and instilled fear into the people of Baligród. During World War II, mass deportations of the Jews and mass killings likewise greatly decreased the town's population.

== Baligród Today ==
Baligród still remains as a village in Poland. After World War II, the Jewish community and Ukrainians never returned to Baligród and to this day there are very few, if any, Jews living in the town. It continues to be an area with small family farms. As most of the area of Baligród Commune is covered by forests and forest land, local activity is being focused on the wood industry. Today, Baligród is a tourist place due to its location near the Bieszczady Mountains and the significant historical sites of the area.

The family of the current Chief Rabbi of Poland, Michael Schudrich has roots in Baligród. The rabbi's mother's parents used to live there under the family name of Roth.

== Notable sites ==
- Catholic church (built in 1877–1879)
- Greek-Catholic church (from 1829)
- Military cemetery (est. 1946–1947, redesigned 1984)
- Bal's castle (remains of its foundations)
- Ruins of Jewish cemetery
