= Baligród massacre =

Coordinates: 49.3372°N 22.2858°E

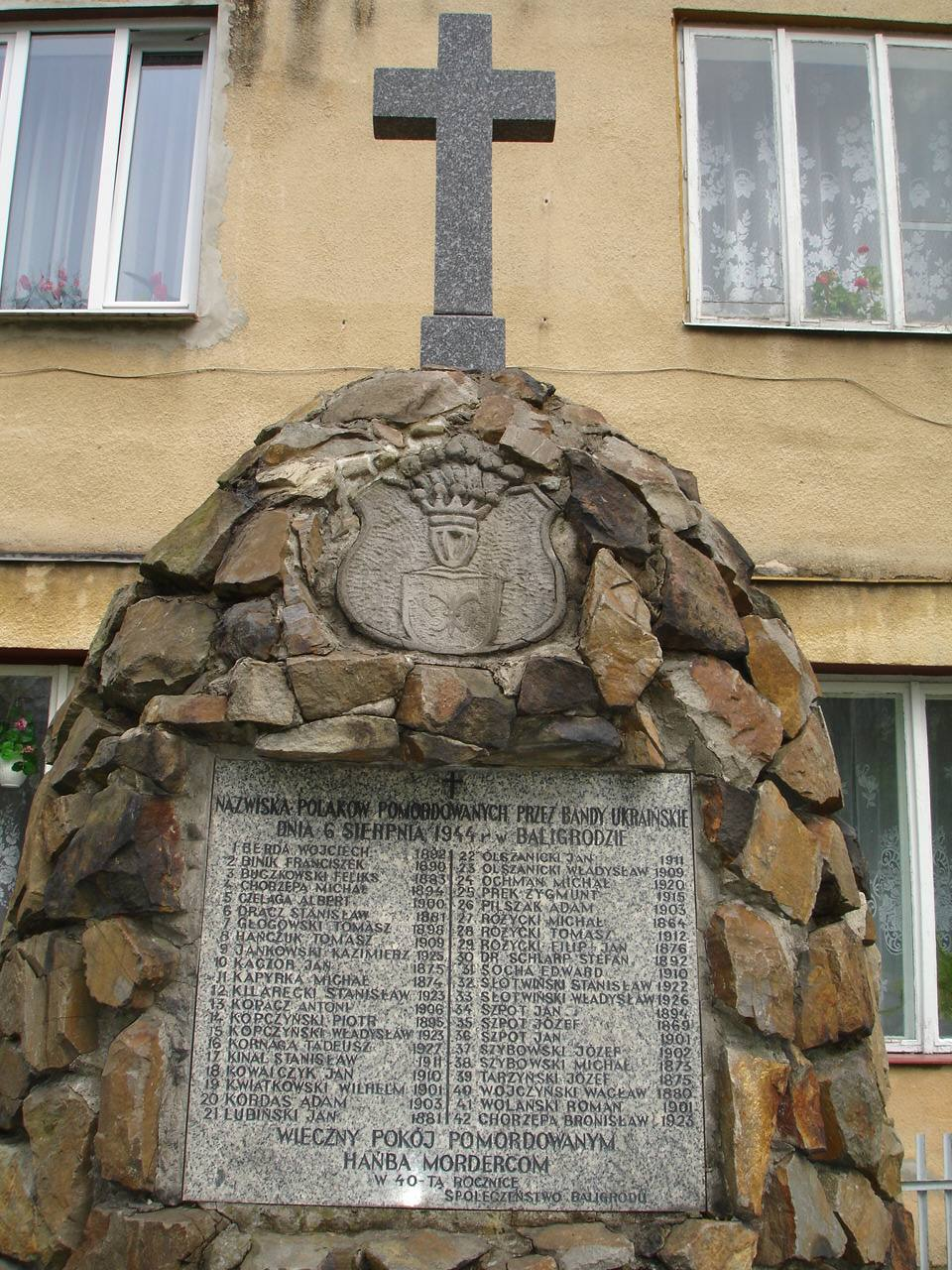
The monument in Baligród

The Baligród massacre occurred on Sunday, 6 August 1944 in Baligród, Lesko County (in the current Subcarpathian Voivodeship), Poland. Ukrainian nationalists with the Ukrainian Insurgent Army (UPA) entered the village of Baligród and killed 42 members of the Polish community.

== The massacre ==
On 6 August 1944, UPA forces advancing from Stężnica and Huczwice surrounded Polish civilians gathered in the local church. As people left the building, 42 were killed by UPA soldiers. The attack came in retaliation for the deaths of 16 Ukrainians in Stężnica on 4 August 1944, whom Baligród civilians and Soviet partisans had killed in self-defence.

On 1 August 1945 at around 22:00, a UPA subunit attacked the local police station. Polish militia defended the station until 05:00, when the attackers withdrew and burned seven houses as reprisal.

== Sources ==
- Grzegorz Motyka, W kręgu "Łun w Bieszczadach", Warszawa 2009, ISBN 978-83-7399-340-2
