= Többens and Schultz =

Nazi Germany textile company

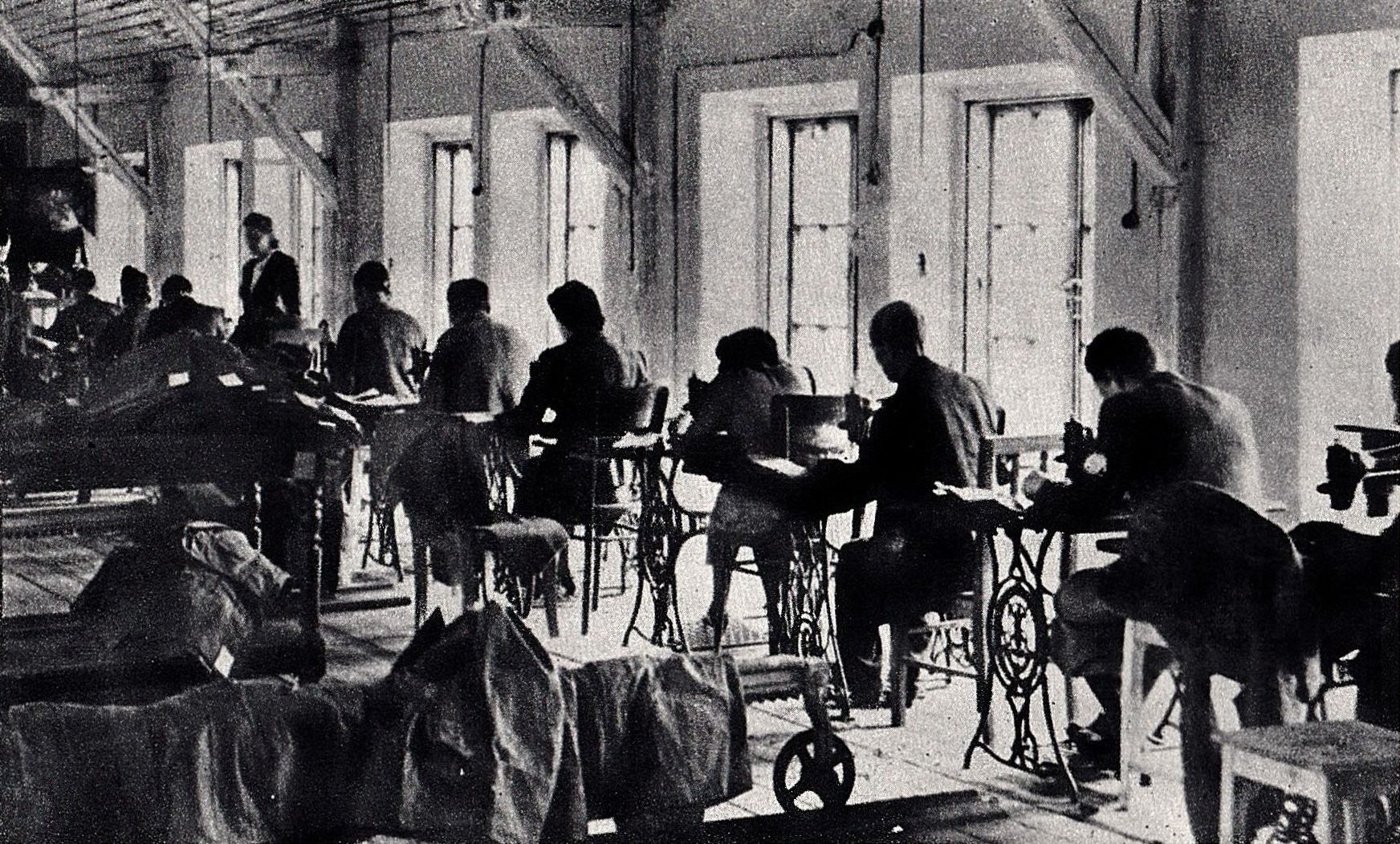
- Textile manufacturing plant in the Warsaw Ghetto
- Native name: Többens und Schultz & Co
- Type: Slave labour
- Industry: Textile manufacturing
- Owners: Fritz Schultz, Walter Többens
- Number of employees: 18,000 (1942)

Többens and Schultz (German: Többens und Schultz & Co) was a Nazi German textile manufacturing conglomerate making German uniforms, socks and garments in the Warsaw Ghetto and elsewhere, during the occupation of Poland in World War II. It was owned and operated by two major war profiteers: Fritz Emil Schultz from Danzig, and a convicted war criminal, Walter C. Többens (i.e. Walther Caspar Toebbens, from Hamburg).

== History ==
Schultz and Többens appeared in Warsaw in the summer of 1941, not long after the Ghetto was closed off with walls topped with barbed wire. The unemployment, hunger and malnutrition there were rampant. At first, they both acted as middlemen between the German high command and the Jewish-run workshops, and placed production orders with them. Within weeks they opened their own factories in the Ghetto using slave labour on a record scale.

By spring 1942 the Stickerei Abteilung division run by Schultz at Nowolipie 44 Street had 3,000 workers making shoes, leather products, sweaters and socks for the Wehrmacht. Other divisions were making furs and wool sweaters also, guarded by the Werkschutz police. Some 15,000 Jews were working for Többens in the Warsaw Ghetto, at the Prosta Street and at the Leszno Street factories among other places. Staying with any of them was a source of envy for other Jews living in fear of deportations. In early 1943 Többens gained for himself the appointment of a Jewish deportation commissar of Warsaw in order to keep his own workforce secure and maximize profits.

=== Relocation ===
Resulting from the Warsaw Ghetto Uprising and the destruction of an entire city district by the SS, in May 1943 Többens had transferred his businesses, including 10,000 Jewish slave workers with families spared from Treblinka, to the Poniatowa concentration camp facility set up near Lublin, part of the so-called "territorial solution to the Jewish Question" never fully realized by the Schutzstaffel (SS). Fritz Schultz took his manufacture along with 6,000 Jews and their 400 children to the nearby Trawniki concentration camp commanded by Karl Streibel.

A number of vastly profitable enterprises were run by the SS in the Lublin reservation, part of the General Government during the Holocaust in Poland. SS-Gruppenführer and Generalleutnant der Polizei Odilo Globocnik from Austria racked up millions of Reichsmarks and gold from his murderous Operation Reinhard. The business was booming, with large amounts of money initially coming from the victims of gassing, and foodstuffs requisitioned from terrorized farmers for free. But not for long.

During the final phase of the Holocaust, the SS-WVHA's economic department under Oswald Pohl had given up the idea of a "reservation", partly due to the Soviet counter-offensive and the Jewish revolts. The SS proceeded to shut down the Ostindustrie entirely in order to prevent further unrest. On 3 November 1943, all sub-camps of the Majdanek death camp were liquidated in Aktion Erntefest, the single largest German massacre of Jews in the entire war, with approximately 43,000 victims across District Lublin fatally shot in fake anti-aircraft trenches by the Reserve Police Battalion 101 (a unit of the German Order Police), augmented by a squad of Hiwis called "Trawniki men". Többens was captured in Austria by the Americans in 1946. He escaped from a train on the way to a trial in Poland and settled under an assumed name in Bavaria, where he founded a new business from his wartime profits. He revealed his identity in 1952, and died in a car accident two years later.

== See also ==
- The Holocaust in occupied Poland
