= German Equipment Works =

German defence contractor (1939–1943)

German Equipment Works (Deutsche Ausrüstungswerke, DAW) was a Nazi German defense contractor with headquarters in Berlin during World War II, owned and operated by the Schutzstaffel (SS). It consisted of a network of requisitioned factories and camp workshops across German-occupied Europe exploiting the prisoner slave labour from Nazi concentration camps and the Jewish ghettos in German-occupied Poland. DAW outfitted the German military with boots, uniforms and materials on the eastern front at a windfall profit, and provided wood and metal supplies, as well as reconstruction work on railway lines and freight trains.

== History ==
The business enterprise was founded in May 1939 and was in operation until 1943. About 15,500 concentration camp prisoners died at DAW due to heavy work loads imposed by the contractor and the inhuman working conditions "calculated not just to cripple their bodies but also to plunge them into a state of perpetual terror." DAW operated several businesses in the Dachau, Sachsenhausen, Buchenwald, and Auschwitz concentration camps, where forced labor was used. Work was later expanded to Majdanek, Janowska, Stutthof, and other concentration camps.

Deutsche Ausrüstungswerke (DAW) was the first SS enterprise established in the Lublin reservation territory of occupied Poland, sometime between late 1940 and early 1941. DAW took over the Lipowa Zwangsarbeiterlager, with prisoners of the Lublin Ghetto, and soon expanded to include Lublin airfield camp, and the Majdanek concentration camp labour force in October 1941. DAW was subordinate to the SS-WVHA. The Lublin Airfield was a location of several of its plants, including a subsidiary of the Waffen SS clothing workshops, the SS garrison, a glass factory, a truck and SS troop supply depot, and a prisoner lab producing pharmaceuticals.

By mid-1942, all death camps of Operation Reinhard were already supplying trainloads of goods from the victims of gassing for further processing: Bełżec from March 1942, Sobibór from May 1942, and Treblinka from July 1942. The remaining Jews in the General Government supplied DAW with slave labour. Odilo Globočnik directed the operation of DAW plants in Lublin and at the Old Airfield camp, the Waffen SS Standortverwaltung workshops and SS Clothing Works, and the police Truppenwirtschaftlager Supply Depot of the HSSPF. All labourers and guards were supplied by Globočnik.

Elizabeth B. White wrote, "The prime example of cooperation between the WVHA and Globočnik was the East Industries Inc. (Ostindustrie GmbH, or Osti), which was founded in March 1943 for the express purpose of using Jewish labor and also exploiting machinery and raw materials formerly owned by Jews in industrial workshops." Therefore, the equipment used by DAW was not German to begin with, but Polish. Osti took over DAW factories in 1943.

== See also ==
- Organisation Todt (OT) civil and military engineering group from Nazi Germany
- SS Main Economic and Administrative Office part of the SS in charge of DAW
