= Ostindustrie =

Nazi German industrial project

SS Ostindustrie GmbH
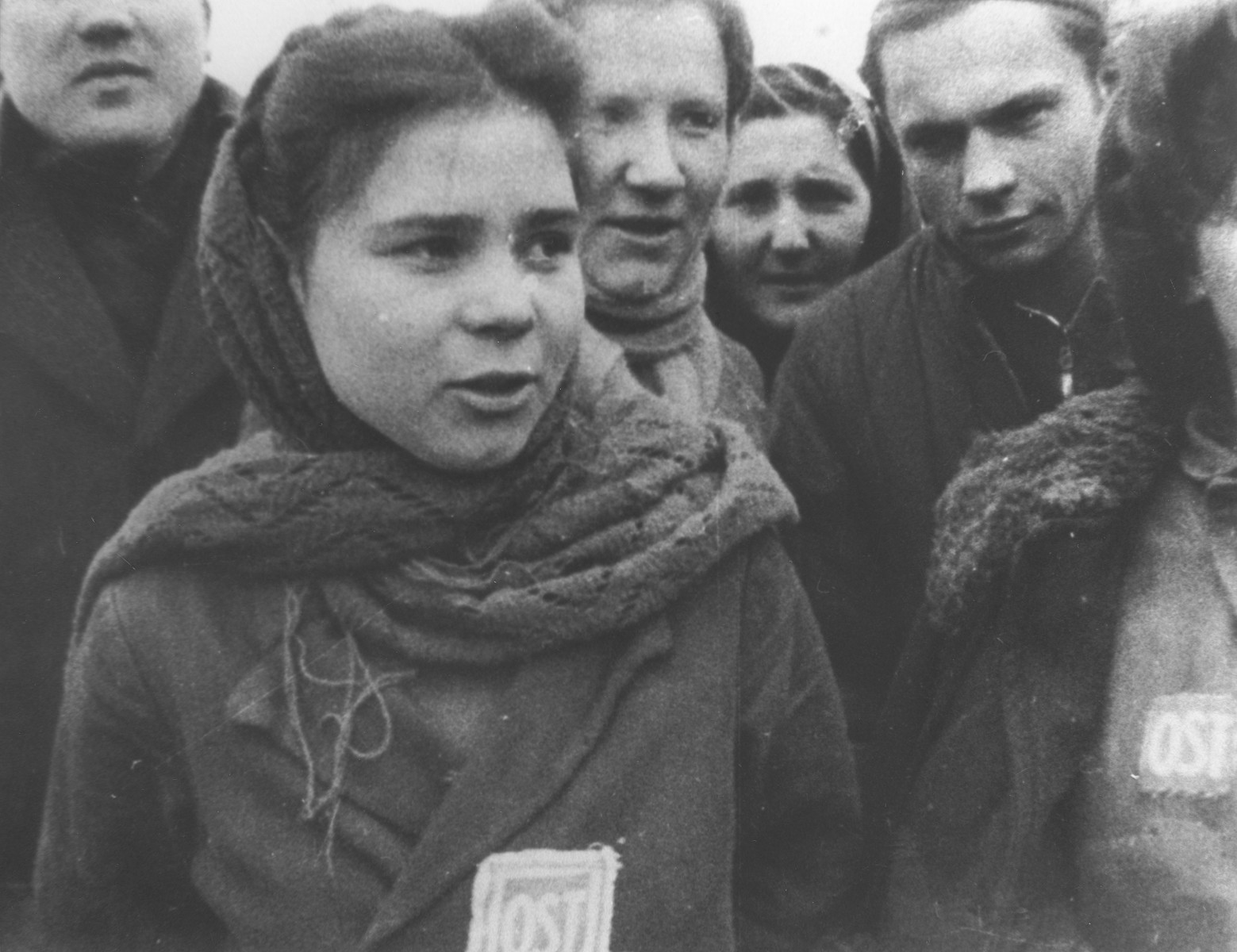
- Female forced laborer wearing an Ost-Arbeiter badge at the former SS Osti Arbeitslager near Łódź, Poland, January 1945
- Company type: Corporation
- Industry: Manufacturing
- Founded: General Government, Poland (March 1943)
- Defunct: March 1944
- Headquarters: Occupied Poland
- Key people: SS-Obersturmführer Max Horn; SS-Gruppenführer Odilo Globocnik
- Owner: SS
- Number of employees: 17,000 forced laborers (peak)

Ostindustrie GmbH ("East Industry", abbreviated as Osti) was one of many industrial projects set up by the Nazi German Schutzstaffel (SS) using Jewish and Polish forced labor during World War II. Founded in March 1943 in German-occupied Poland, Osti operated confiscated Jewish and Polish prewar industrial enterprises, including foundries, textile plants, quarries and glassworks. Osti was headed by SS-Obersturmführer Max Horn, who was subordinated directly to Obergruppenführer Oswald Pohl of the SS Main Economic and Administrative Office. At its height, some 16,000 Jews and 1,000 Poles worked for the company, interned in a network of labor and concentration camps in the Lublin District of the semi-colonial General Government territory.

SS-Gruppenführer Odilo Globocnik hoped to make Ostindustrie into an armaments company, but gave up the idea to pursue Operation Reinhard instead. The company was dissolved ahead of the Soviet counter-offensive of 1944. The entire slave-labor workforce of Osti was exterminated in the process of the company's dissolution, during the deadliest phase of the Holocaust in Poland.

== Operations ==
By 16 May 1943, the SS Ostindustrie GmbH controlled several factories and workshops across Poland, grouped into five active Werke. These included a glassworks in Wołomin (Werk I), a turf factory in Dorohucza (Werk II), a broom and brush factory in Lublin (Werk III), workshops in Bliżyn, Radom, and Tomaszów (Werk IV), and Splitwerk – a grouping which comprised a shoe factory, tailoring factory, carpentry and joinery at the Budzyn Arbeitslager, a turf factory in Radom and an iron foundry in Lublin (Werk V). Several additional Werke were under construction at that time, including vehicle spare parts factories, the Trawniki Arbeitslager (Werk VI), earth and stone works in Lublin (Werk VII), a medical sanitary ware factory (Werk VIII), various slave-labor workshops in Lemberg, and the Poniatowa Arbeitslager (later transferred to Többens). By mid-1943, Globocnik projected the labor force of Osti to include some 45,000 Jews from a network of parallel camps with the main branch at Majdanek concentration camp; however, the physical infrastructure in the region was insufficient for such numbers.

== Dissolution ==
Max Horn believed that Jewish forced labor was the way of the future, but his plans were halted by the Warsaw and Białystok ghetto uprisings, the latter of which occurred where the Ostindustrie textile and armament factories were scheduled for relocation. In the wake of the uprisings, and with the war on the Eastern Front increasingly turning against Germany, the SS decided to eliminate Poland's remaining Jewish forced laborers to prevent further unrest. On 3 November 1943, Osti's workforce was liquidated in its entirety in the course of Aktion Erntefest, the single largest German massacre of Jews in the entire war, with approximately 43,000 victims across District Lublin being shot in fake anti-tank trenches. Subsequently, Horn complained in a report to Globocnik about the outcome of Aktion Erntefest; he stated that it had made Osti "completely valueless through the withdrawal [sic] of Jewish labor". The company became officially defunct in March 1944.

== See also ==
- Deutsche Ausrüstungswerke, the predecessor of Ostie owned and operated by the SS
- Baudienst, a conscript labour service run by German authorities in Occupied Poland

== Bibliography ==
- Schulte, Jan Erik (1 January 2007). de Gruyter, Walter (ed.). Juden in der Ostindustrie GmbH (in German). Institut für Zeitgeschichte. pp. 54–56. ISBN 978-3110956856.
- "Białystok – History". Virtual Shtetl (Museum of the History of Polish Jews). pp. 6–7. Archived from the original on 17 October 2013.
