= Nisko Plan =

Cancelled Nazi deportation plan for Jews

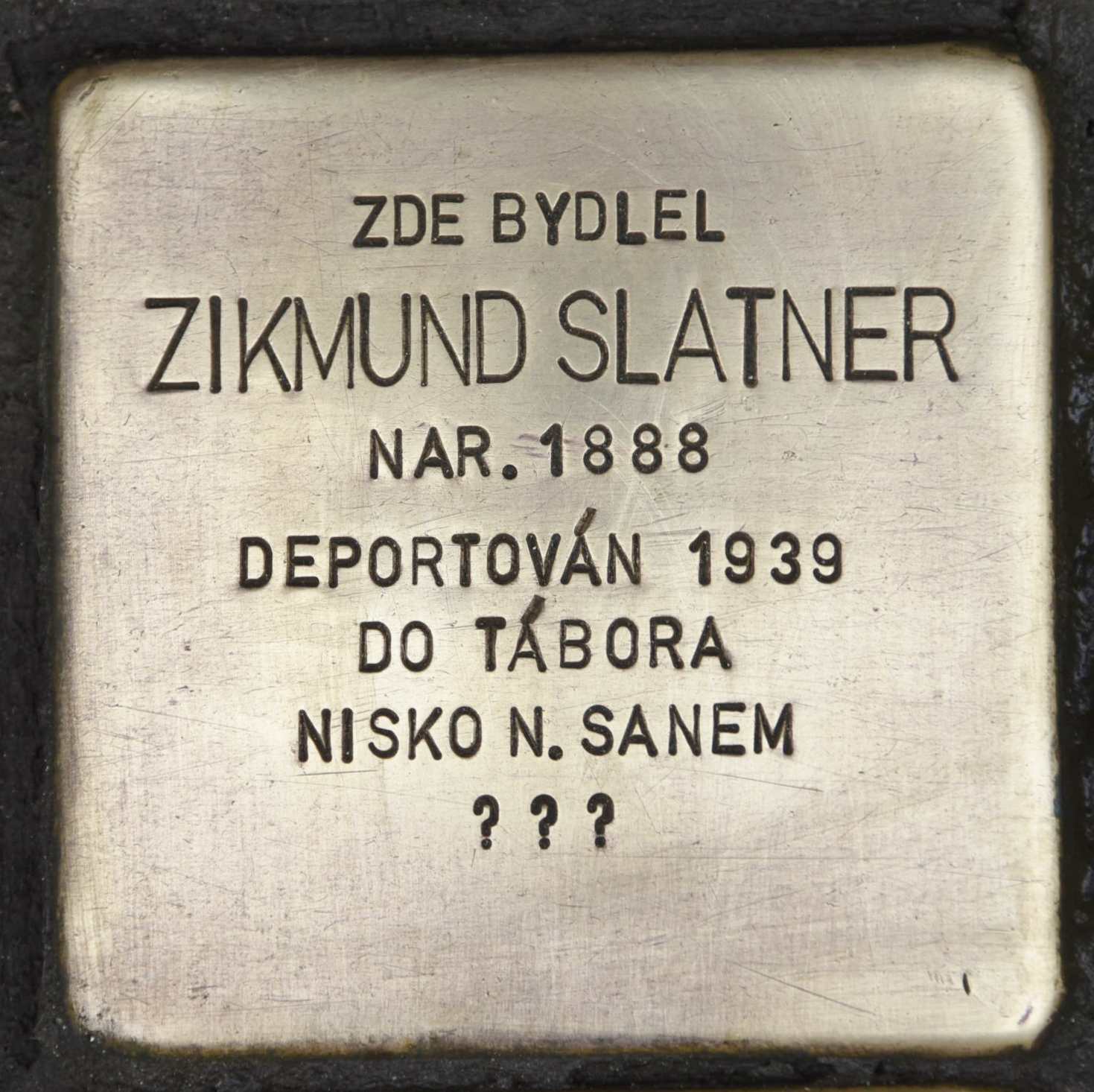
Stolperstein for Zikmund Slatner, deported from Ostrava to Nisko.

The Nisko Plan was an operation to deport Jews to the Lublin District of the General Governorate of occupied Poland in 1939. Organized by Nazi Germany, the plan was cancelled in early 1940.

The idea for the expulsion and resettlement of the Jews of Europe into a remote corner of the Generalgouvernement territory, bordering the cities of Lublin and Nisko, was devised by Adolf Hitler and formulated by his SS henchmen. The plan was developed in September 1939, after the invasion of Poland, and implemented between October 1939 and April 1940, in contrast to similar Nazi "Madagascar" and other Jewish relocation plans that had been drawn up before the attack on Poland, at the beginning of World War II. It bore similarities to the American Indian reservations.

Hitler devised the idea with the help of Nazi chief ideologist Alfred Rosenberg and Reichsführer-SS Heinrich Himmler, including the participation of SS-Obersturmbannführer Adolf Eichmann ("architect of the Holocaust"); as well as Heinrich Müller of the Gestapo, and Governor-General Hans Frank and deputy governor Arthur Seyss-Inquart of the Generalgouvernement administration. Gruppenführer Odilo Globocnik, the former Gauleiter of Vienna who was appointed the SS and Police Leader of the new Lublin District, was put in charge of the reservation. During the early implementation of the plan, the Nazis set up a system of ghettos for Jewish civilians to use them as forced labor for the German war effort. The first forced labor camps were established for the Burggraben project intended to fortify the Nazi–Soviet demarcation line and to supply the local SS units at Lublin from Lipowa.

In total, about 95,000 Jews were deported to the Lublin reservation. The main camp of the entire complex was set up in Bełżec initially (before the construction of death camps) for Jewish forced labor. In March 1942, it became the first Nazi extermination camp of Operation Reinhard, with permanent gas chambers arranged by Christian Wirth in fake shower rooms. Though the Burggraben camps were temporarily closed in late 1940, many of them were reactivated in 1941. Two additional extermination camps, Sobibor and Majdanek, were later set up in the Lublin district. The Lipowa camp became a subcamp of the latter in 1943. The Nisko Plan was abandoned for pragmatic reasons; nevertheless, the Zwangsarbeitslagers (German for "forced labor camps") already established for DAW became the industrial base of other SS projects such as Ostindustrie. A number of them functioned until Aktion Erntefest, others beyond the massacres.

== Background ==
The antisemitic regime in Nazi Germany intended to achieve a permanent solution to what they regarded as the "Jewish question". Before the Final Solution was announced and organised during the Wannsee Conference of 20 January 1942, some top Nazis had envisioned a territorial solution of the "Jewish question". However, except for the Nisko Plan, none of the territorial solutions progressed beyond the planning stage. Instead, the Nazi Germans implemented the near-complete extermination of the European Jews through the Holocaust.

=== Planning ===
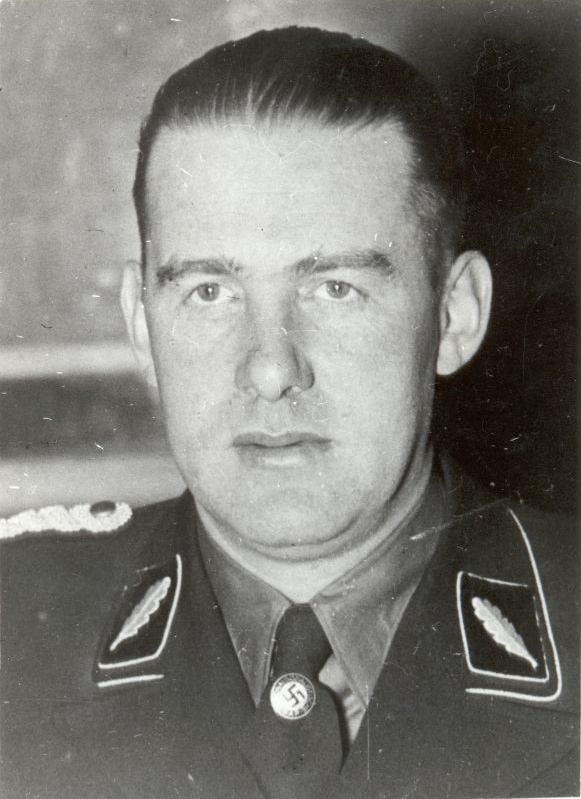
Odilo Globocnik

In late summer 1939, Nazi German dictator Adolf Hitler, with one of his foremost Nazi ideologues Alfred Rosenberg, developed the idea for a Jewish "reservation" (Judenreservat). The town of Lublin in Poland had been the focus of Nazi planners since the early 1930s, after Herrmann Seiffert described it as the center of Jewish worldwide power and source of their genetic potential. After Nazi Germany had defeated Poland in September 1939 and partitioned the country with the Soviet Union, the Lublin area became part of the Generalgouvernement headed by Hans Frank. Once under Nazi German control, the area was inspected by Frank's deputy Artur Seyss-Inquart in November 1939. He reported that – according to the local governor – the area, "swampy in its nature", would serve well as a reservation for Jews, and that "this action would cause [their] considerable decimation." On 25 November, Frank informed the local administration that an influx of "millions of Jews" was proposed. Also in November, Odilo Globocnik was put in charge of all issues regarding the Jews in the Lublin area, representing the SS as the area's SS and Police Leader. Globocnik set up a department led by a Dr. Hofbauer to plan the settlement of the expected Jews and their conscription to forced labor.

== Lublin Reservation ==
The original Lublin Reservation comprised an area of 800 to 1,000 square kilometres (300 to 400 square miles) located between the Vistula and San rivers, southeast of Lublin. Adolf Eichmann, then head of the Central Office for Jewish Emigration for the Protectorate of Bohemia and Moravia, was the first to realize the Nisko Plan by deporting Jews to the Lublin Reservation. While initially the Jews of East Upper Silesia were to be deported there, Eichmann expanded the program to include Jews from Mährisch-Ostrau in the Protectorate of Bohemia and Moravia and from Vienna. Eichmann also set up a transit camp in Nisko, a town on the western border of the Lublin district, from which the deportees were to be expelled eastward.

Heinrich Himmler

The first Jews were shipped to Lublin on 18 October 1939. The first train loads consisted of Jews deported from Austria and the Protectorate of Bohemia and Moravia. When the second and third transports were prepared, Heinrich Müller, on behalf of SS head Heinrich Himmler, ordered on 19 October a suspension of further deportations. Historian Christopher Browning noted that Himmler's decision must be seen in correlation with his new position as chief coordinator of the resettlement of ethnic Germans to the former Polish areas annexed by Nazi Germany, a position he held since 15 October. He suggested also that Himmler did not consider the deportation of Jews from all the Third Reich to be as urgent as providing space for the Generalplan Ost resettlement of ethnic Germans into Nazi Germany's new eastern provinces.

This priority shift resulted in focusing on the expulsion of Jews from these provinces to the Lublin reservation, the contemporary resettlement of about 30,000 ethnic Germans from the Lublin district in the opposite direction, and the resettlement of Jews living within the Generalgouvernement to the eastern bank of the Vistula. Hitler approved of this priority shift: While in early October he had envisioned the short-term expulsion of all Jews from Vienna and 300,000 Jews from the Altreich to the Lublin reservation, in late October he approved Himmler's plans for deportation of 550,000 Jews from the new eastern provinces and all "Congress Poles", meaning Poles from the Soviet partition residing in the Third Reich, to the Lublin reservation. While this would have resulted in short-term expulsions of one million people, this number was cut down for capacity reasons to 80,000 after intervention on 28 November 1939 by Reinhard Heydrich, chief of the Reich Security Main Office.

The reservation was not kept secret; the local population was aware and the international press reported on it. Reports in the Luxembourgian paper Luxemburger Wort of 12 November and the British paper The Times of 16 December 1939 both gave a total of 45,000 Jews deported to the reservation so far. Also in December, the American paper The Spectator reported the camps were enclosed by barbed wire on an area of 80 by 100 kilometres (50 by 60 miles) near Nisko and Lublin 105 km (65 mi) apart from each other, and prepared for an intake of 1,945,000 Jews. An excerpt from a Luxemburger Wort report of November 1939 reads:

Sometimes trains drive on for forty kilometres beyond Lublin and halt in the open country, where the Jews alight with their luggage and have to find themselves primitive accommodation in the surrounding villages. — Luxemburger Wort newspaper.

Historians estimate that by 30 January 1940, a total of 78,000 Jews had been deported to Lublin from Germany, Austria and Czechoslovakia. This figure was given by Heydrich when he reported in Berlin in January. He stated the number would increase to 400,000 by the end of the year. Among the Jews deported to the reservation in February 1940 were the Pomeranian Jews, resulting in Gauleiter Franz Schwede-Coburg declaring his Pomeranian Gau the first Gau of the Altreich to be judenrein ("cleansed of Jews"). The deportees were put under the authority of the Judenrat in neighboring Lublin. By April, when the reservation was dissolved, the total number of Jews who had been transported to Nisko had reached 95,000.

Many deportees had died due to starvation, either during the transport or during their stay in the reservation. Additional deaths in the reservation were caused by typhus and typhoid fever epidemics, the lack of housing and any "sources of livelihood", a situation the local Jews were not able to ease, despite their great efforts.

== Adjacent forced labor camps ==
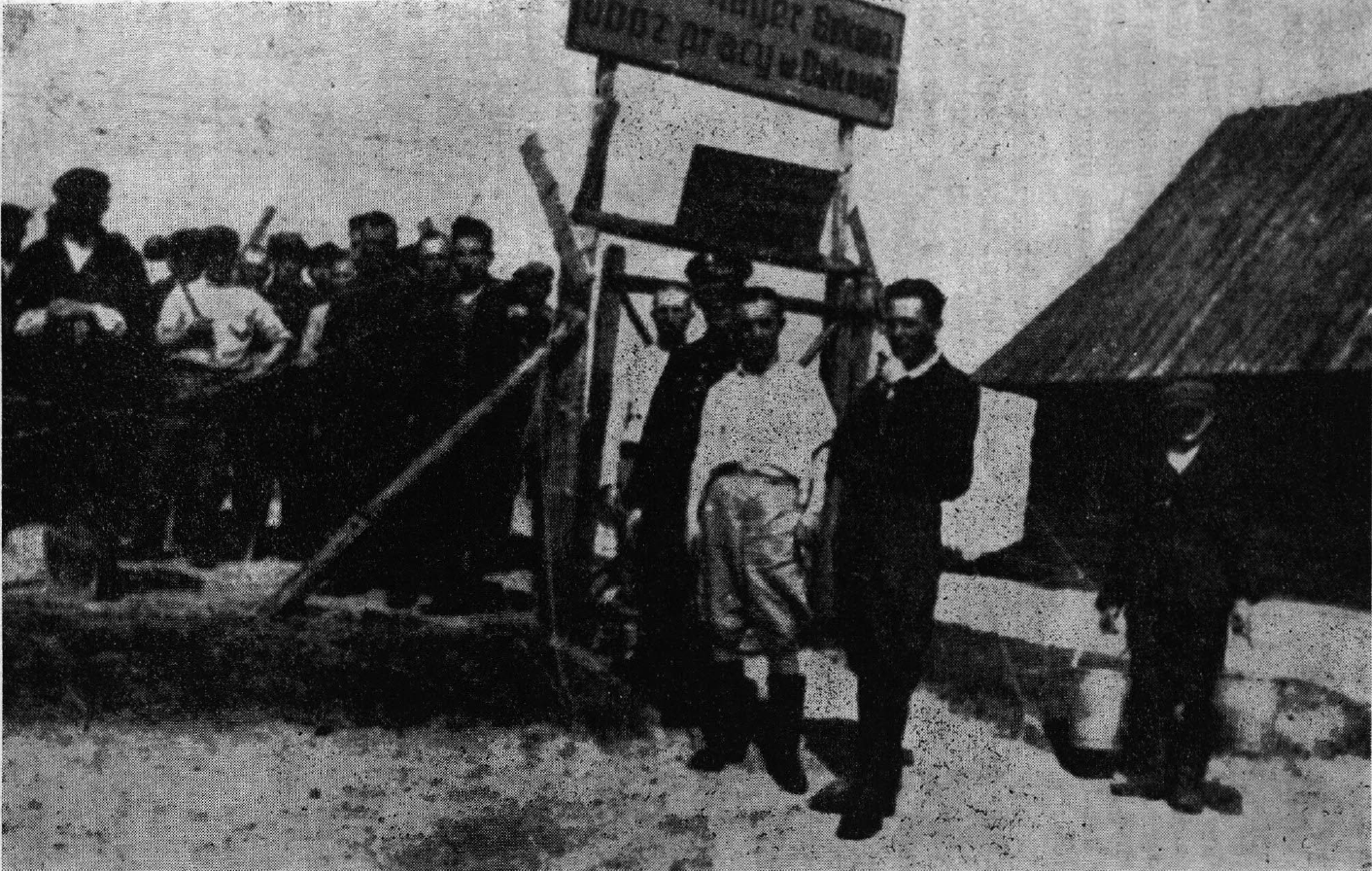
Labor camp in Bukowa, Lublin Voivodeship, near Nisko

From early 1940, some of the Jews deported to the Lublin area were held in the Lipowa 7 camp. These were deportees from the Altreich as well as from Reichsgau Danzig-West Prussia, Reichsgau Wartheland, and South East Prussia. The Lipowa camp remained in place after the Lublin reservation was abandoned. After January 1941, the Lublin Jews who earlier had resided outside the camp, were forced to live in the camp after its expansion. Also in 1941, the camp was officially made part of the SS enterprise Deutsche Ausrüstungswerke (DAW). Effectively it remained outside DAW control by staying under the direct aegis of Globočnik. This changed only in 1943, after Globočnik resigned as the Lublin district SS-and-Police Leader and the camp became the sub-camp of Majdanek concentration camp complex.

=== Burggraben project ===
When the Lublin reservation was planned, the reservation was to be combined with several forced labor camps (Zwangsarbeiterlager, ZALs) along the Nazi–Soviet demarcation line. The reservation was to supply the ZALs with workforce to erect military defense facilities, including a large anti-tank ditch along the demarcation line code-named Burggraben ("fortress' ditch"). While initially the SS headquarters had envisioned four large camps, governor Hans Frank refused to finance such a large project. Thus Odilo Globočnik decided instead to set up various small camps run at a lower cost. This resulted in desperate conditions: the inmates were crowded in dark and dirty rooms with no glass in the windows, had to sleep on the floor, the sick were not separated from the healthy, and the supply of food, water and soap was insufficient. About 30% of the inmates did not have shoes, pants, or shirts. This situation caused a rapid spread of lice and diseases. Of all Burggraben-ZAL-camps, the later extermination camp Bełżec was the main camp. The Burggraben project was abandoned in late 1940 due to pressure applied by the German military (Wehrmacht), who regarded it to be of no military use. Heinrich Himmler, however, disagreed and continued to support the project. While the Burggraben camps had been closed in late 1940, some were reinforced in spring 1941 on Himmler's initiative and again put under Globočnik's supervision to finish the anti-tank ditch.

=== Suspension of the reservation idea ===
On 23 March 1940, Hermann Göring with Himmler's approval put a hold on the Nisko Plan, and by the end of April, final abandonment was announced by Krüger. Reasons for the abandonment included Frank's refusal to accept further influx of deportees into "his" General-Government which he viewed as overcrowded, and the fear the Nazis would lose international reputation due to the international press reports. The rationale of the abandonment was not one of principle, but a pragmatic one, and deportations continued at a slower pace.

== Holocaust historiography ==
In the functionalism versus intentionalism debate, which began in the 1960s, the Nisko Plan was brought up by Holocaust historians as an example of escalation of the Nazi anti-Jewish measures in World War II. Christopher Browning in his article, "Nazi Resettlement Policy and the Search for a Solution to the Jewish Question, 1939–1941", focused on the presumed Nazi intention for territorial solutions preceding the subsequent genocide. Nevertheless, already at the beginning of war, on 24 October 1939 The Times noted that the German plan to create a Jewish state was cynical, and would surely doom the Jews to a deadly famine. Most historians of Nazi Germany and the Holocaust have concluded that the Nisko Plan was integrally related to Hitler's other programs and his intent to destroy the Jews in Europe. Thus the Nisko Plan was a preface to the Final Solution.

Browning has suggested that the Nisko Plan was an example that Hitler did not have previous intentions for the gassing of the Jews. He contends that the Nisko (or Lublin) Plan, Madagascar Plan and Pripet Marsh Plan, all served as territorial solutions to the Jewish question, but were separate from the Final Solution. Mainstream historians contend that Hitler and his government formulated an issue out of the "Jewish question", raised broad anti-semitism in Germany, and created the need for a type of "territorial solution" which could only result in a genocide.

== Sources ==
- Borák, Mečislav (2009). První deportace evropských Židů: transporty do Niska nad Sanem, 1939–1940 (in Czech). Český svaz bojovniků za svobodu, městský výbor v Ostravě. ISBN 978-80-86904-34-4.
- Browning, Christopher R. (2007). The Origins of the Final Solution: The Evolution of Nazi Jewish Policy, September 1939–March 1942. University of Nebraska Press. ISBN 978-0-8032-0392-1.
- Dwork, Debórah, Jan van Pelt, Robert, Holocaust: A History, W.W. Norton and Company, New York, 2003. ISBN 0-393-32524-5
- Kats, Alfred, Poland's Ghettos at War, Twayne Publishers, Inc., New York, 1970. ASIN B0006D06QE
- Nicosia, Francis, Niewyk, Donald, The Columbia Guide to the Holocaust, Columbia University Press, New York, 2000. ISBN 0-231-11200-9
- Yahil, Leni, The Holocaust: The Fate of European Jewry, 1932–1945, Oxford University Press, Inc., New York, 1990. ISBN 0-19-504523-8
- Nisko: Die ersten Judentransportationen. By Jonny Moser. Vienna: Edition Steinbauer, 2012. ISBN 978-3902494528
- SEEV GOSHEN. "EICHMANN UND DIE NISKO-AKTION IM OKTOBER 1939 Eine Fallstudie zur NS-Judenpolitik in der letzten Etappe vor der "Endlösung"" (PDF).
- Přibyl, Lukáš (2000). "Das Schicksal des dritten Transports aus dem Protektorat nach Nisko" [The Fate of the Third Transport from the Protectorate to Nisko]. Theresienstädter Studien und Dokumente (in German) (7): 297–342. CEEOL 186410.
