= David Peleg =

Israeli historian and diplomat

David Akiva Peleg (Hebrew: דוד עקיבא פלג; 1942 − 27 November 2013) was an Israeli historian and diplomat. From 2004 to 2009, he served as the ambassador of Israel to Poland. He was later appointed director of the World Jewish Restitution Organization.

== Biography ==
Peleg was born in Jerusalem to a family of Jewish origin from Suwałki, Poland. After World War II, he graduated from the Hebrew University in Jerusalem as a specialist in general history and the history of Islam. In 1965, he started his career within the Israeli diplomatic service. He served at various posts in Israeli embassies worldwide, after which in 1986 he started his work for the Ministry of Foreign Affairs. Before the outbreak of the Gulf War on 14 January 1991, Peleg as Minister of Information of the Israeli Embassy in Washington, was interviewed by Tom Leykis and the interview was carried nationally on C-SPAN.

In 1996, he returned to diplomacy and briefly served as the Israeli representative to the New York branch of the United Nations. In 1998, he moved to the corresponding post in Geneva, where he remained until 2000. From 2004 to his death in 2013, he served as the Israeli Ambassador to the Republic of Poland. In 2006, he met with Janusz Kurtyka, President of the Institute of National Remembrance Commission for the Prosecution of Crimes against the Polish Nation, to discuss cooperation between the IPN and Israeli organizations such as Yad Vashem.

== See also ==
- Israel–Poland relations
