= Zasław concentration camp =

Zaslaw
- Concentration camp
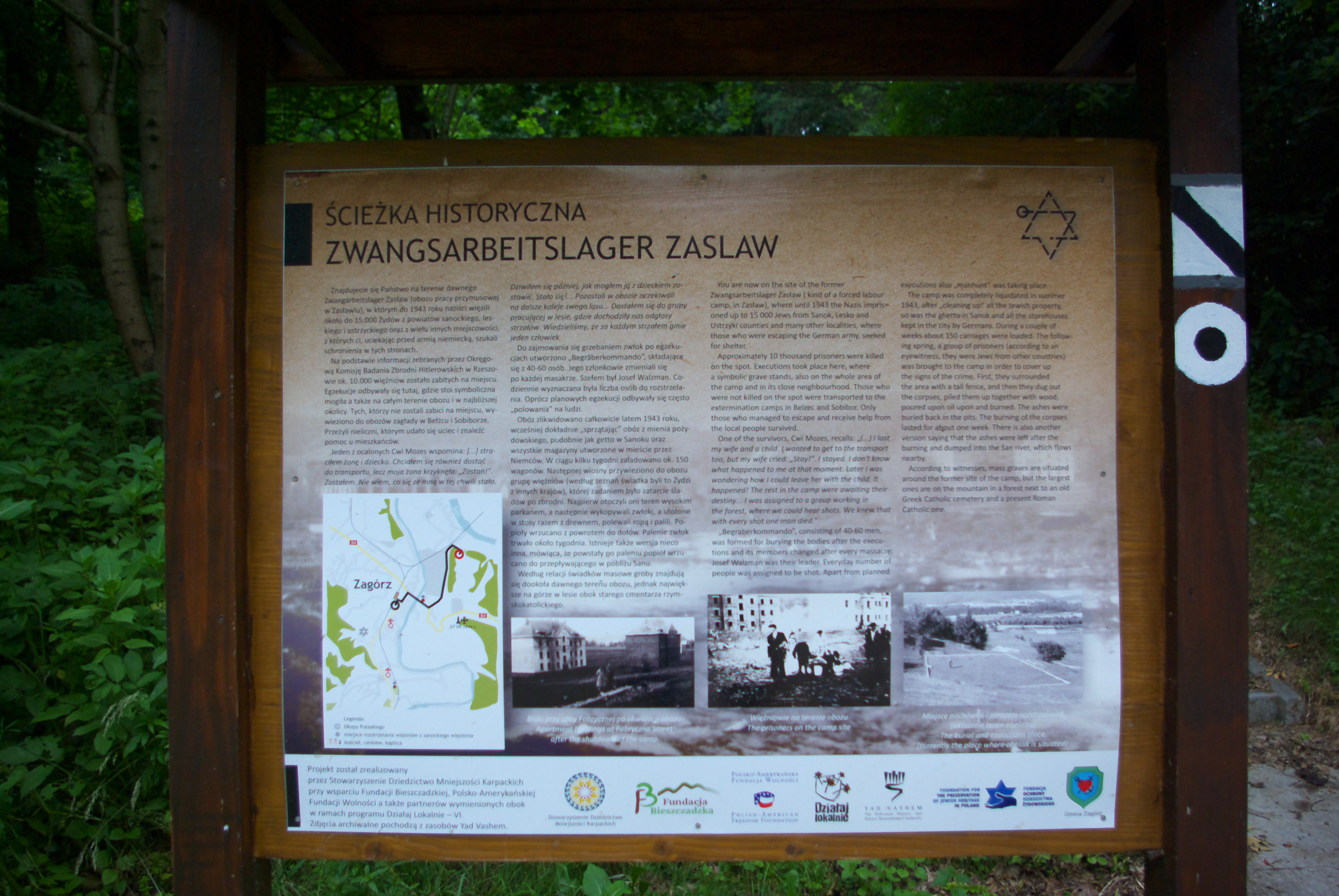
- Prisoners of Zwangsarbeitslager Zaslaw Zasław location south-east of Plaszow (below Belzec) during World War II, map of Poland in 1939

- Location of Zaslaw camp in modern Poland
- Coordinates: 49°31′11″N 22°16′38″E
- Known for: The Holocaust in Poland
- Inmates: mainly Jews

Zasław concentration camp (in German: Zwangsarbeitslager Zaslaw) was a World War II Nazi German concentration camp, established for ghettoised Jews in occupied Poland near the village of Zasław (now part of Zagórz in Poland), 6.7 kilometres (4.2 mi) south-east of the industrial city of Sanok which belonged to the Lwów Voivodeship of the Second Polish Republic before the invasion. Sanok had one of the largest Jewish population in the region.

== Operation ==
Zaslaw was a forced labor camp where Polish Jews living in the city of Sanok and its vicinity were deported for confinement and exploitation before the onset of the Holocaust in occupied Poland. Between 1940 and 1943 some 15,000 prisoners passed through the camp.

In August 1939, 5,400 Jews lived in Sanok. Similarly as in other parts of Poland, also in Sanok the Jews were persecuted, had their property confiscated, were forced to work and systematically murdered. The murders took place at the Glinki cemetery in Sanok. Many Sanok Jews died of emaciation while working for [Nazi German] Kirchhof company [locally], which was wound up in 1942, with the employees transferred to Zasław camp. A tailoring, shoemaking and fur-making workshop were set up in the camp. Many Jews also worked building or repairing roads. By the end of 1943 the camp was liquidated. A thousand Jews were murdered in Zasław, with 5,000 more taken to Bełżec camp. The murdering of the Jews in Sanok took place at locations situated on the outskirts of the town, in the woods, so the victims could immediately be buried. The annihilation of Sanok Jews took place gradually rather than through a single act.

— Małgorzata Stawiarska

On January 15, 1943, the prisoners of Zaslaw were transported to the Belzec extermination camp, where they were killed in gas chambers.

== Commemoration ==
A memorial to murdered Jews was erected in Zasław by the employees of the bus company in Sanok. The memorial to victims of Nazism sits almost directly opposite the town cemetery in Zasław.
