= Bystra =

Bystra or Bystrá may refer to places:

== Czech Republic ==
- Bystrá (Pelhřimov District) in the Vysočina Region
- Bystrá nad Jizerou in the Liberec Region

== Poland ==
- Bystra, Gorlice County in Lesser Poland Voivodeship (south Poland)
- Bystra, Sucha County in Lesser Poland Voivodeship (south Poland)
- Bystra, Bielsko County in Silesian Voivodeship (south Poland)
- Bystra, Żywiec County in Silesian Voivodeship (south Poland)
- Bystra, Pomeranian Voivodeship (north Poland)
- Bystra, West Pomeranian Voivodeship (north-west Poland)

== Slovakia ==
- Bystrá, Brezno District in the Banská Bystrica Region
- Bystrá, Stropkov District in the Prešov Region
- Bystrá (mountain), in the Western Tatras

== See also ==
- Bystre (disambiguation)
- Bystré (disambiguation)
