= Nowosiółki, Podkarpackie Voivodeship =

Nowosiółki
- Village
- Location within Poland
- Coordinates: 49°24′20″N 22°17′25″E
- Country: Poland
- Voivodeship: Subcarpathian
- County: Lesko
- Gmina: Baligród
- Population: 350

Nowosiółki [nɔvɔˈɕuu̯kʲi] is a village in the administrative district of Gmina Baligród, within Lesko County, Subcarpathian Voivodeship, in south-eastern Poland. Notable attractions include a nature museum and two churches.

== Etymology ==
Its name comes from nowy, meaning "new" in Polish, and przysiółek, meaning "hamlet" (shortened to siółek). Thus, its name means "new hamlet", coming from the fact it was founded as a hamlet, belonging to Zahoczewie.

== Location and characteristics ==
The village is located on the road between Hoczew and Baligród, two larger towns. The village includes the "Knieja" Fishing and Nature Museum, owned by the Wałachowski family, which includes dioramas of animals of the Bieszczady Mountains, as well as archival photographs and hunting trophies. A church dedicated to Saint Peter and Saint Paul constructed in 1912 is found there.

== History ==
Nowosiółki was founded in the 14th century on the lands of the Bal family of Baligród. It was a hamlet part of the nearby village of Zahoczewie, but was separate by 1659. During Operation Vistula, its Ukrainian population was forcibly deported. The wooden church in the town was constructed on 2 August 1975 by a crowd of devout local Roman Catholics led by the town's priest. Its foundation was laid in secret prior to the act.

=== Historical demographics (1921) ===
As of 1921, 576 people lived in the 101 homes of Nowosiółki. Of the 576 inhabitants, 437 were Greek Catholics, 103 were Roman Catholics, 35 were Jews, and 1 was Evangelicalist.
