= Bystré =

Bystré may refer to places:

== Czech Republic ==
- Bystré (Rychnov nad Kněžnou District), a municipality and village in the Hradec Králové Region
- Bystré (Svitavy District), a municipality and village in the Pardubice Region
- Bystré, a village and part of Mochtín in the Plzeň Region
- Bystré, a village and part of Stárkov in the Hradec Králové Region

== Slovakia ==
- Bystré, Vranov nad Topľou District

== See also ==
- Bystre (disambiguation)
