= Żerdenka =

- Village
- Location within Poland
- Coordinates: 49°24′N 22°19′E
- Country: Poland
- Voivodeship: Subcarpathian
- County: Lesko
- Gmina: Baligród

Żerdenka [ʐɛrˈdɛŋka] is a village in the administrative district of Gmina Baligród, within Lesko County, Subcarpathian Voivodeship, in south-eastern Poland.

== Location ==
The village is located near the Hoczewka, just south of Hoczew.

== History ==
Żerdenka was found in the holdings of the Bal family of Hoczew by 1552. Unlike most other villages in the Bieszczady Mountains, it did not have its own Eastern Orthodox church. Only in 1906 was a small chapel built. After World War II, during Operation Vistula, its population was forcibly deported and it fell into ruin, but it was soon resettled and, more recently, faithfully restored.

=== Historical demographics (1921) ===
As of 1921, 180 people lived in the 31 homes of Żerdenka. Of the 180 inhabitants, 167 were Greek Catholics and 13 were Roman Catholics.
