= Kopa Bukowska =

Mountain in the Bieszczady Mountains, Poland

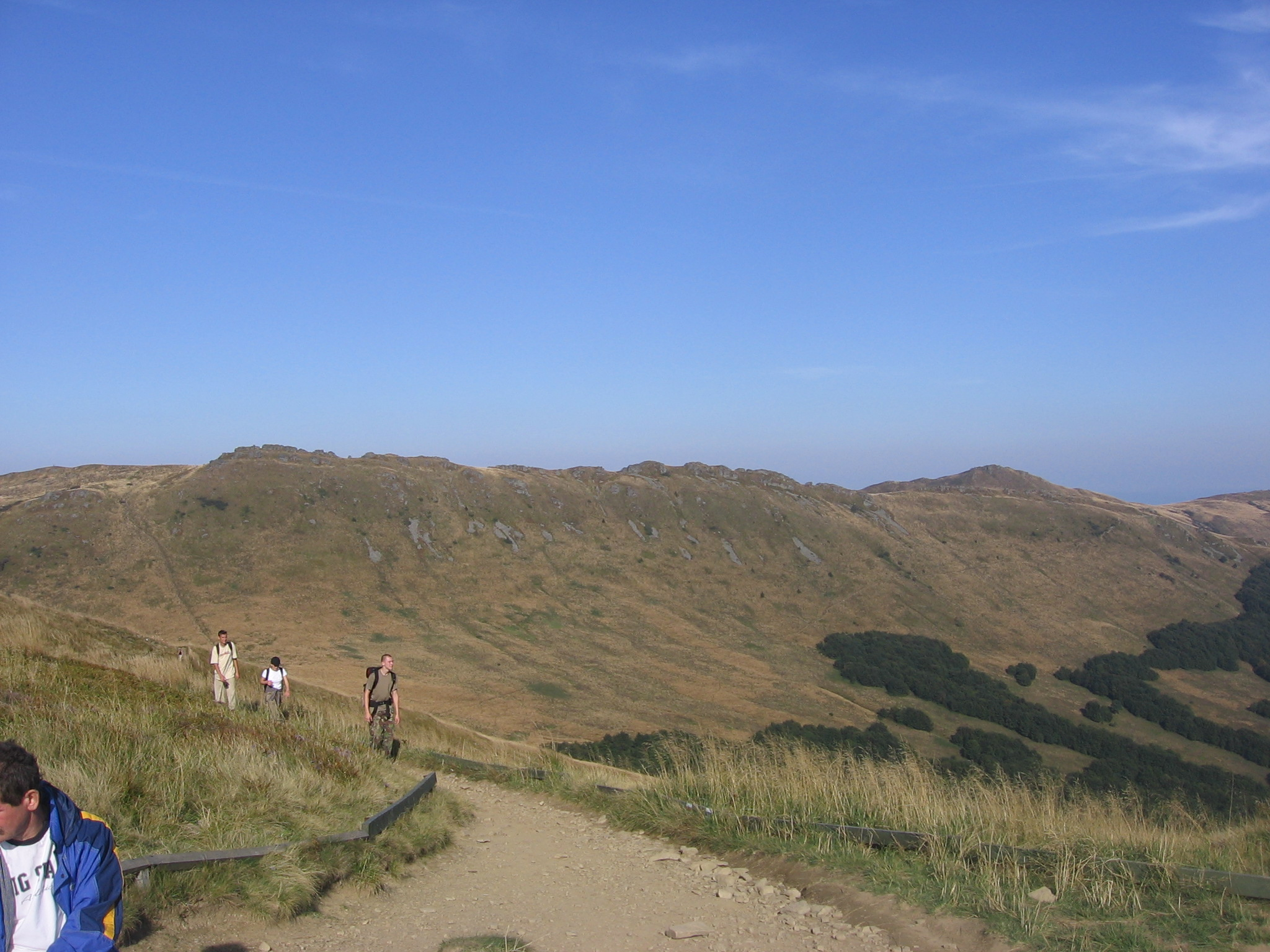
- View of Bieszczady mountains including Kopa Bukowska

Highest point
- Elevation: 1,320 m (4,330 ft)
- Listing: Mountains of Poland
- Coordinates: 49°4′56″N 22°45′33″E

Geography
- Location within Poland
- Country: Poland
- Parent range: Bieszczady Mountains

Kopa Bukowska is a peak in the Bieszczady Mountains in southern Poland. Its height is 1,320 metres (4,330 feet).
