= Karol Świerczewski =

Polish and Soviet army general

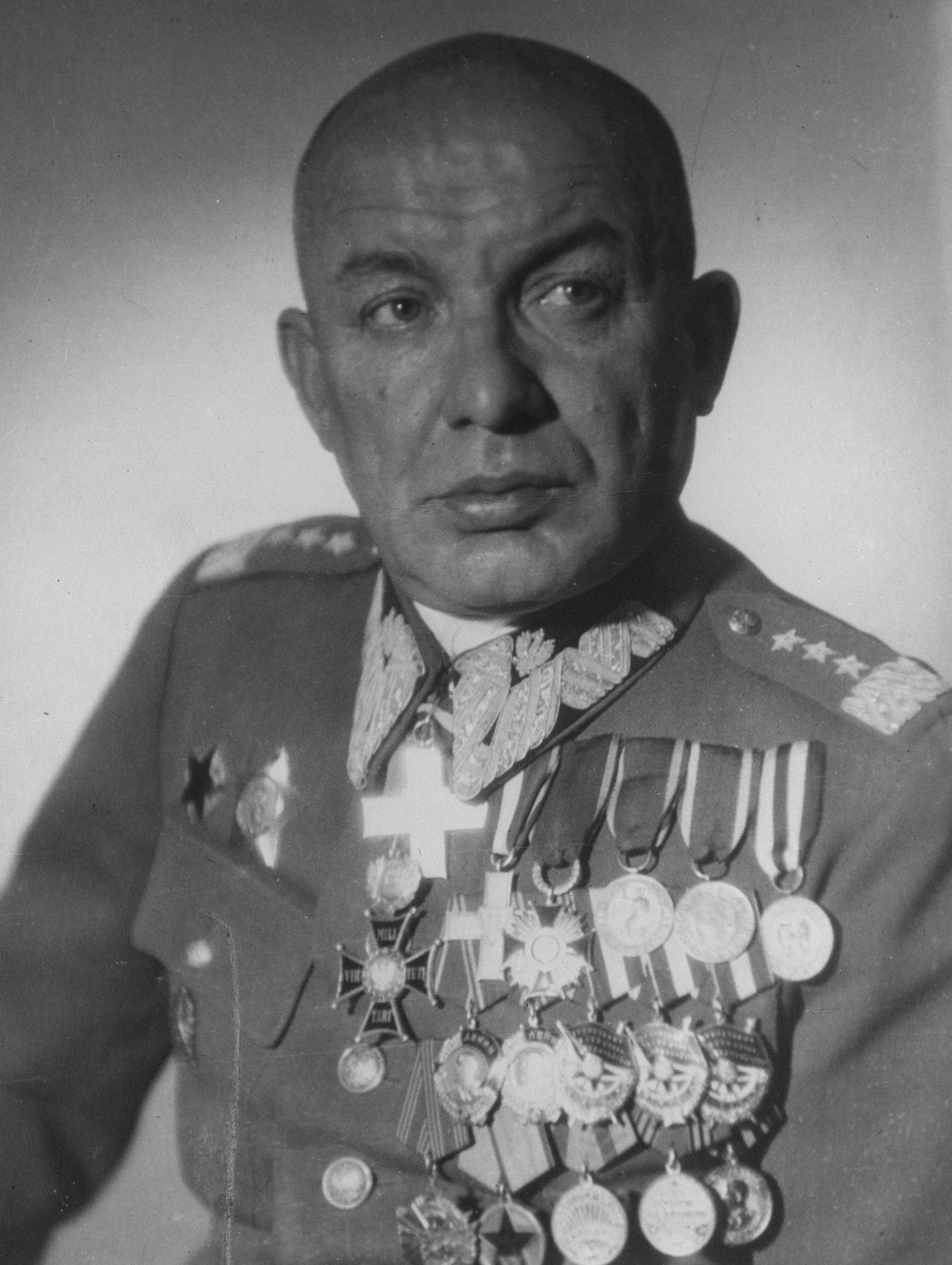
- Świerczewski c. 1946
- Born: 22 February 1897; Warsaw, Congress Poland, Russian Empire
- Died: 28 March 1947 (aged 50); Bieszczady, Polish People’s Republic
- Alma mater: Frunze Military Academy
- Military career
- Allegiance: Soviet Union; Second Spanish Republic; Polish People's Republic
- Service years: 1918–1947
- Rank: Colonel General
- Nickname: General Walter
- Commands: XIV International Brigade; 35th International Division; 248th Rifle Division; Second Army (Poland)
- Conflicts: Russian Civil War; Polish–Soviet War; Spanish Civil War; World War II
- Awards: Virtuti Militari; Order of the Cross of Grunwald; Cross of Merit (Poland); Medal of Victory and Freedom 1945
- Other work: Politician

Deputy Defense Minister of Poland
- In office February 1946 – March 1947

Karol Wacław Świerczewski (pronounced [ˈkarɔl ɕfjɛrˈt͡ʂɛfskʲi]; callsign Walter; 22 February 1897 – 28 March 1947) was a Polish and Soviet Red Army general and statesman. He was a Bolshevik Party member and served in the Soviet Red Army during the Russian Civil War and participated in the wars against the Polish and Ukrainian Republics. He also participated alongside the Republicans during the Spanish Civil War. At the start of World War II In 1939, he participated in the Soviet invasion of Poland. At the end of the war he was installed as one of leaders of the Soviet-sponsored Polish Provisional Government of National Unity. Soon later, Świerczewski died in a country-road ambush shot by the militants from OUN-UPA. He was an icon of communist propaganda for the following several decades.

== Life ==
Born in Warsaw in Congress Poland, Karol Świerczewski grew up in a poor working-class family and began working at age 12 in a local Warsaw factory. During the First World War, at the age of 18 he was evacuated in 1915 to Moscow by the Russian Imperial Army. According to his official biography in the Polish People's Republic he was a member of the Social Democracy of the Kingdom of Poland and Lithuania.

In 1918 he joined the Bolshevik Party, and fought in the Russian Civil War as a soldier of the Red Army. In 1919 during the Polish-Soviet War he fought on the Soviet side against the Polish Second Republic and was wounded. He remained in Russia and in 1928 on the occasion of the 10th anniversary of establishment of the Red Army he was awarded the Order of the Red Banner (no. 146), his first military award. From 1921, Świerczewski taught in the Soviet School for the Red Commissars. In 1927 he graduated from Frunze Military Academy in Moscow and worked in the Red Army General Staff.

=== Spain ===
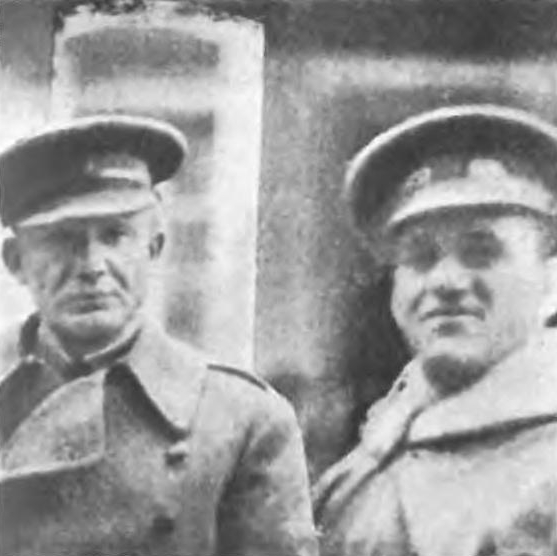
"General Walter" (Świerczewski, left) and Vladimir Ćopić in Spain, 1937

In 1931-1933 and maybe later Świerczewski was heavily involved in armed insurrection trainings, delivered by Comintern to Spanish communists in Moscow. His direct role is unclear, though he later produced highly detailed reports on the classes given; he suggested a number of measures to improve their quality. Already at the time he used the nick-name Walter. In late 1935, when officer ranks were introduced in the Soviet Army, Świerczewski was classified as colonel.

In 1936, under the name General Walter, he was sent to Spain during the Spanish Civil War, where he initially led the XIV International Brigade in the Battle of Lopera, and later the 35th International Division in the Segovia offensive, and the battles of Brunete, Belchite, Teruel, and the Aragon Offensive. By April 1938 Spanish communist leaders wanted the replacement of many International Brigade commanders due to poor performance, and although André Marty disagreed, he had to compromise and General Walter and Vladimir Ćopić were replaced.

=== General in the Red Army ===
In June 1940 Świerczewski was promoted from colonel to the lowest general rank, general major. Following the outbreak of the Second World War and the Soviet invasion of Poland, Świerczewski served as general in the Soviet Army. On June 27, 1941 he was given command of the 248th Rifle Division as it began forming at Vyazma. He led the division until it was largely encircled and destroyed during Operation Typhoon in the first weeks of October, although he remained in nominal command until late December. His Russian commanders, seeing Świerczewski's apparent incompetence and worsening alcoholism, moved him to a reserve command away from the front lines—the decision was made by General Georgi Zhukov himself. The fact that Świerczewski gave most of his orders under influence of alcohol had tragic consequences for his soldiers, described in General Zygmunt Berling's book Wspomnienia (Memories).

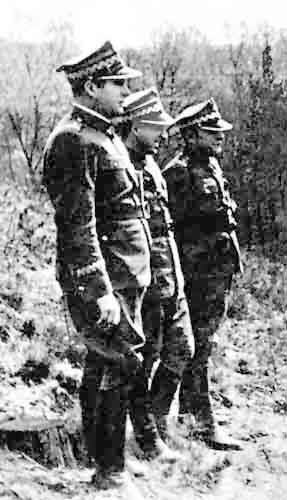
Michał Rola-Żymierski, Marian Spychalski and Karol Świerczewski (from left to right)

In 1943 he became one of the generals charged with the creation of the Soviet-controlled Polish Armed Forces in the East, the 1st Polish Army. His alcoholism and disregard for the life and health of his soldiers stirred conflict with Zygmunt Berling, and led to his removal from command on several occasions. Świerczewski's alcoholism-related orders gained criticism from other Polish generals as well, including General Aleksander Waszkiewicz.

In 1944 he became one of the leaders of the Polish Workers' Party and the government of People's Republic of Poland. In the winter of 1944 and the spring of 1945 he led the Polish Second Army during the fighting for western Poland and the Battle of Berlin. His leadership in the Battle of Bautzen (Budziszyn) has been severely criticized by modern historians, and he is held responsible for the Second Army's very heavy casualties in that engagement. While commanding, he might have been drunk, and was temporarily relieved of his command. However, due to important backing in the Soviet political apparatus (Main Intelligence Directorate or NKVD), not only did he retain his command, but his mistakes were hushed up, and after the war he was glorified as a hero.

In February 1946 Świerczewski became the Deputy Defense Minister of Poland. He was involved in the persecution of the anti-communist underground movement in Poland, and signed many death sentences, while establishing the communist regime.

== Death ==
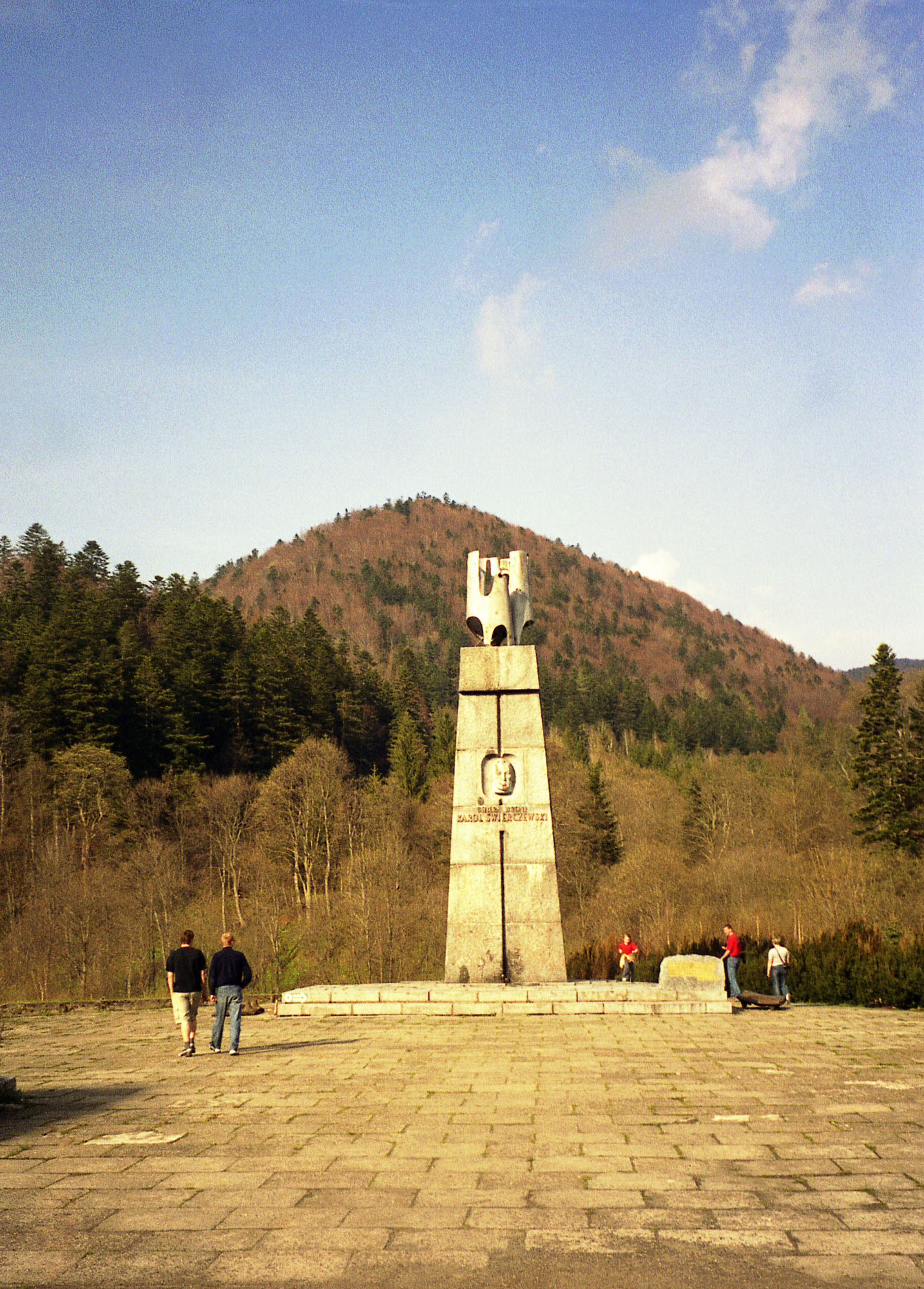
Świerczewski's monument near his place of death, in Bieszczady mountains. It has since been demolished.

Świerczewski was heavily wounded in a skirmish near Baligród in March 1947 while driving in a car without escort for the inspection of Polish troops fighting Ukrainian insurgents. He was ambushed by a unit of the Ukrainian Insurgent Army and died from his wounds within hours. There were several conspiracy theories claiming that the ambush was arranged by Soviet Intelligence due to his insubordination. According to one theory, the information about the general's arrival to the area was passed to Ukrainians by the NKVD and his escort prevented from leaving by mechanical problems with both trucks that were to have transported the escort's soldiers. Most other hypotheses also suggest Soviet or even direct orders from Stalin. The general, a Pole by ethnicity but essentially a Soviet officer with a military record from the Spanish Civil War and a long Red Army war record, had been previously placed lower in the command structure than prewar Polish officers Berling and Rola-Żymierski.

For several years after the Second World War ended, the Ukrainian Nationalist insurgency, led mainly by the Ukrainian Insurgent Army, continued fighting in the South-East of Poland. This war, largely supported by the local Ukrainian part of the population, continued until 1949, with some sporadic fights taking place as late as 1956. Świerczewski's death was used as direct cause for the forcible expulsion of the Ukrainian civilian population in Operation Vistula from the territories in the South Eastern part of the post-war Poland to the Recovered Territories (Ziemie Odzyskane, areas of western Poland, which before the war had been part of Germany). In the socialist Poland many myths were created around Karol Świerczewski ("The General of Three Armies"), but details of his life and especially his service in the Red Army during Polish-Soviet War as well as the details of his Spanish War record were never mentioned.

== Awards ==
- Polish People's Republic:
  - Order of the Builders of People's Poland (posthumous)
  - Virtuti Militari (Grand Cross) (posthumous)
  - Virtuti Militari (Commander)
  - Order of the Cross of Grunwald (1st class)
  - Gold Cross of Merit
  - Medal of Victory and Freedom 1945
  - Silesian Uprising Cross
  - Medal "For Oder, Neisse and the Baltic"
  - Medal "For Warsaw 1939-1945"
  - Medal "For Your and Our Freedom" (posthumous)
- Soviet Union:
  - 2 Orders of Lenin (1937, 1945)
  - Order of the Red Banner, three times (1928, 1938, 1944)
  - Order of Suvorov, 1st class (1945)
  - Medal "For the Liberation of Warsaw" (1945)
  - Medal "For the Capture of Berlin" (1945)
  - Medal "For the Victory over Germany in the Great Patriotic War 1941–1945" (1945)
  - Jubilee Medal "XX Years of the Workers' and Peasants' Red Army" (1938)
- Other countries:
  - Order of the White Lion, 2nd class (Czechoslovakia)
  - Silver Medal of the Czechoslovak Military Order for Liberty (Czechoslovakia)
  - Laureate Plate of Madrid (Spanish Republic)
  - Order of the Liberation of Spain (Spanish Republic)
  - Order of Bravery (Yugoslavia)
  - Order of the Partisan Star, 1st class (Yugoslavia)

== Legacy ==
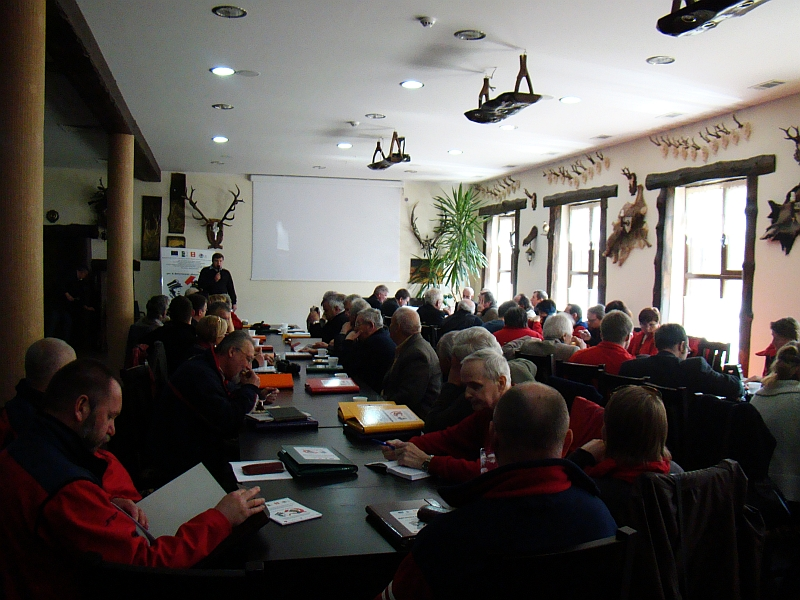
Academic conference on Karol Wacław Świerczewski in Stężnica in Gmina Baligród

In People's Republic of Poland, the Polish communist propaganda made him into a hero, and many controversial aspects of his life such as alcohol abuse and his incompetence during the Battle of Bautzen, as well as postwar Stalinist crimes were hushed up. In 1953, a Polish two-part film depicting the life of Świerczewski, Żołnierz zwycięstwa (A Soldier of Victory), was released. Józef Wyszomirski portrayed the General.

In the years 1945-1991 the present Miguel de Cervantes Liceum in Warsaw was named after him as well as the Polish General Staff Academy. Also the John Paul II Avenue in Warsaw bore his name.

During the years 1975–1994 Karol Świerczewski's picture was on the popular 50 złoty banknote, initially the equivalent of two bottles of cheap Vodka. After 1989 with the end of the Warsaw Pact and the coming to power of Solidarity, many of his monuments were removed and streets renamed because of his role in implementing the communist regime in Poland.

On May 21, 2003, the Polish organization of former veterans and independence fighters applied to the Institute of National Remembrance (IPN) to investigate 'crimes against the Polish nation' committed by Karol Świerczewski. In a letter, they recall that he was "one of the people who consciously worked towards [the] enslavement of Polish nation, through enforced communist regime that was [a] vassal towards Moscow". Among crimes that are not subject to expiry and should be investigated by the IPN are 29 death sentences on Polish soldiers and officers, which were signed by Świerczewski during his command of the Soviet-controlled 2nd Polish Army.

== Photography ==
While generally unwilling to let himself be photographed, General Walter was a keen amateur photographer. His daughter donated 333 of his photographs to the Asociación de Amigos de las Brigadas Internacionales in Albacete, Spain, to form a permanent part of their archive.
