= Jabłonki =

- Village
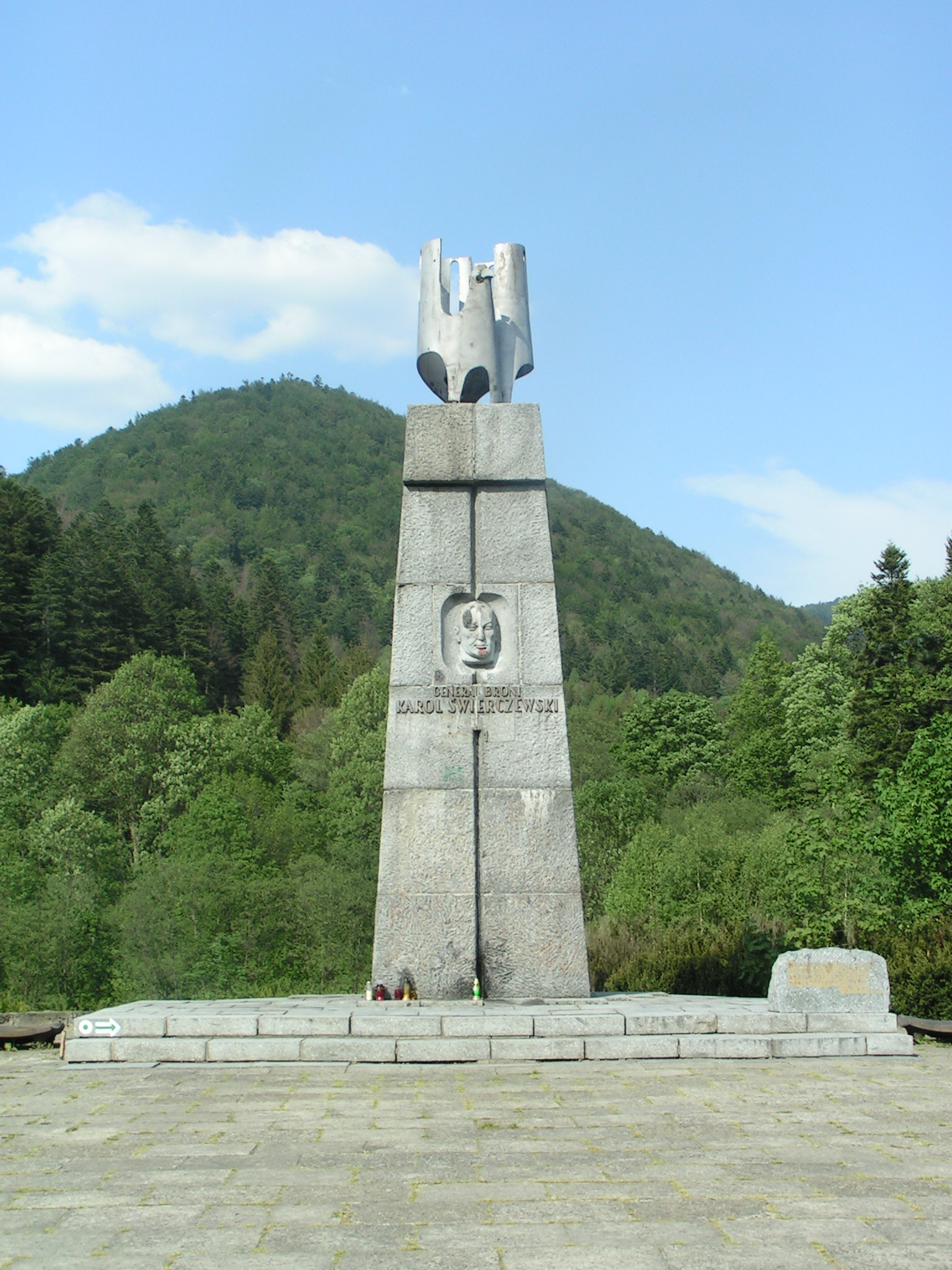
- Monument to Karol Świerczewski in Jabłonki

- Location within Poland
- Coordinates: 49°16′N 22°17′E
- Country: Poland
- Voivodeship: Subcarpathian
- County: Lesko
- Gmina: Baligród

Population
  - Total: 110

Jabłonki [jaˈbwɔŋkʲi] is a village near the Bieszczady mountains, in the administrative district of Gmina Baligród, within Lesko County, Subcarpathian Voivodeship, in south-eastern Poland.

== History ==
The Church named Pokrovy Presviatoi Bogoroditsi of the village Jablonki was built in the first half of the 18th century. The first church book dated to 1786 had following family names - Ilkiw, Rabyk, Petryk, Kawchak, Cygan, Golyk, Melnyk, Musula, etc.

It was in Jabłonki that on 28 March 1947, Poland's General Karol Świerczewski was killed in an ambush organised by the Ukrainian Insurgent Army (UPA). Three days later 30 wounded soldiers of Border Protection Corps were murdered by UPA partisans.

== See also ==
- Operation Vistula
