= Kiełczawa =

- Village
- Location within Poland
- Coordinates: 49°21′30″N 22°12′10″E
- Country: Poland
- Voivodeship: Subcarpathian
- County: Lesko
- Gmina: Baligród

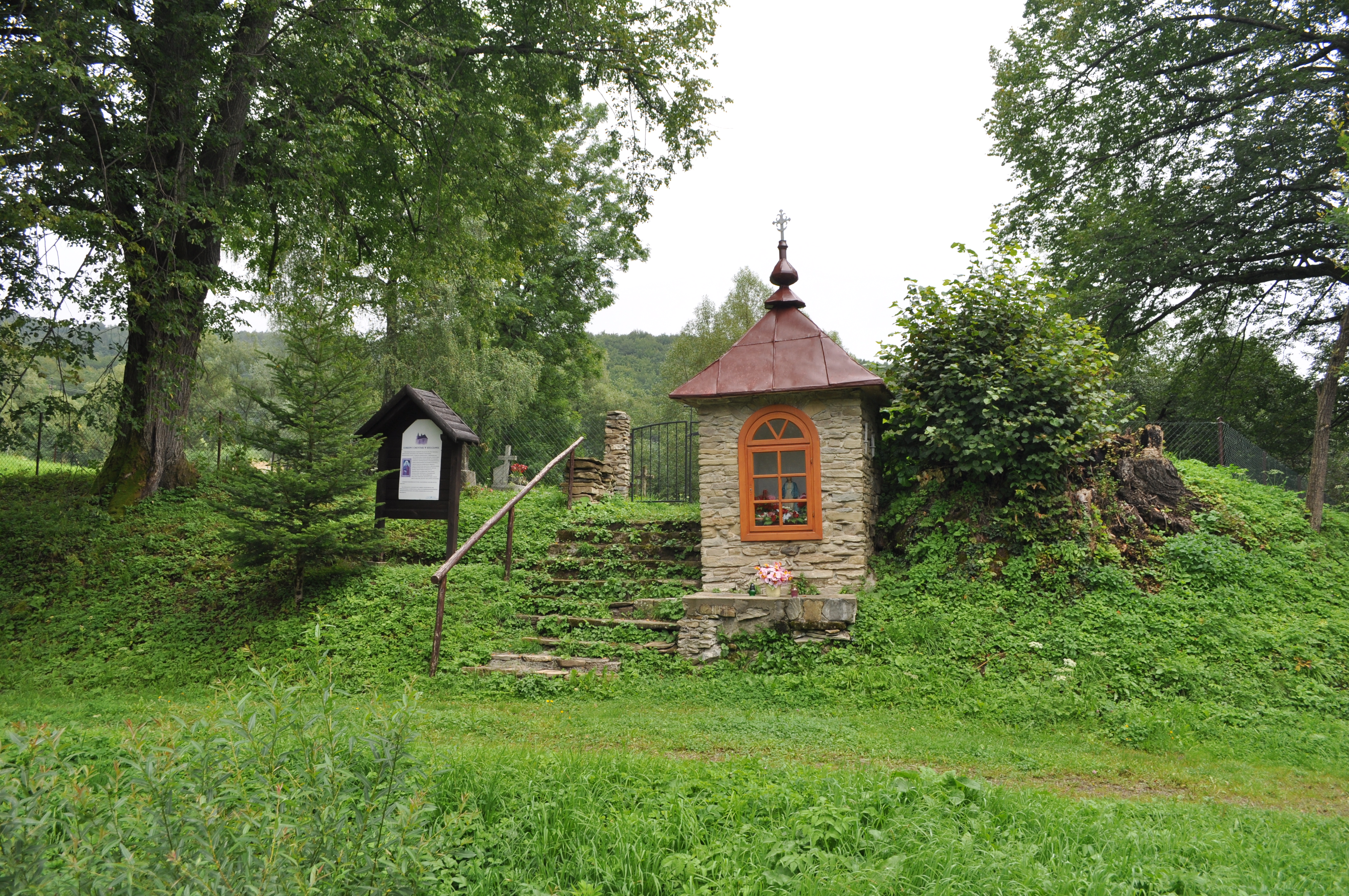
Shrine near cemetery in Kiełczawa

Kiełczawa [kʲɛu̯ˈt͡ʂava] is a village in the administrative district of Gmina Baligród, within Lesko County, Subcarpathian Voivodeship, in south-eastern Poland.
