= Roztoki Dolne =

- Village
- Location within Poland
- Coordinates: 49°20′33″N 22°14′47″E
- Country: Poland
- Voivodeship: Podkarpackie
- County: Lesko
- Gmina: Baligród

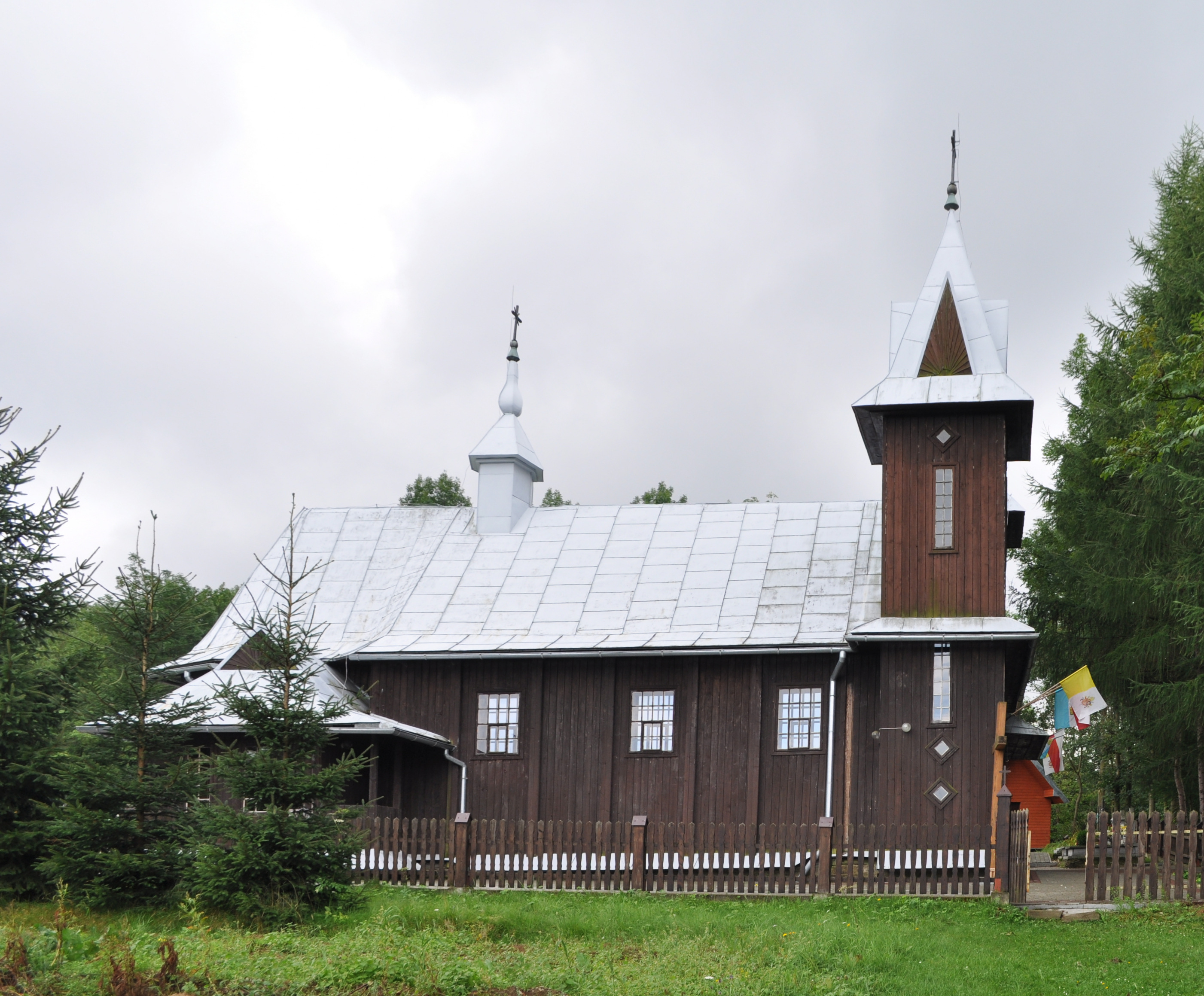
Church in Roztoki Dolne

Roztoki Dolne [rɔsˈtɔkʲi ˈdɔlnɛ] is a village in the administrative district of Gmina Baligród, within Lesko County, Podkarpackie Voivodeship, in south-eastern Poland.
