= Albert Marenčin =

Slovak writer (1922–2019)

Albert Marenčin (26 July 1922 in Bystré, Vranov nad Topľou District – 9 March 2019) was a Slovak writer, poet, surrealist, essayist, screenwriter, editor, collage artist, translator and critic.

== Early life ==
He was a participant in the Slovak National Uprising in 1944. On 19 October 2011, he was awarded the 2011 Zora Jesenská Prize by The Slovak Association of Literary Translators.

== Family ==
He had a son and a grandson, who are both also named Albert Marenčin. Another son of his is the photographer Martin Marenčin.
