= Żernica Niżna =

- Village
- Location within Poland
- Coordinates: 49°22′27″N 22°18′9″E
- Country: Poland
- Voivodeship: Subcarpathian
- County: Lesko
- Gmina: Baligród

Żernica Niżna [ʐɛrˈɲit͡sa ˈɲiʐna] is a former village in the administrative district of Gmina Baligród, within Lesko County, Subcarpathian Voivodeship, in south-eastern Poland.

== Location and characteristics ==
Żernica Niżna was located on the Ruchlin stream, a tributary of the Hoczewka, north of Baligród. Its most important feature is the chapel of Our Lady of the Gate of Dawn. Each year, on the last day of May, May devotions take place there.

== History ==
The village, first known as Szernycza, was founded on the lands of the Bal family of Hoczew. A few Roma families lived there, and a Greek Catholic church was completed there in 1843. In 1932, the aforementioned chapel was built by the local Polish population. Today, it is the only remaining construction in the now-empty valley. Three crosses, marking grave sites, are found near the chapel.

=== Historical demographics (1921) ===
As of 1921, 395 people lived in the 70 homes of Żernica Niżna. Of the 395 inhabitants, 230 were Greek Catholics, 138 were Roman Catholics, and 27 were Jews.
