= Żernica Wyżna =

- Village
- Location within Poland
- Coordinates: 49°21′57″N 22°19′29″E
- Country: Poland
- Voivodeship: Subcarpathian
- County: Lesko
- Gmina: Baligród
- Population: 10

Żernica Wyżna [ʐɛrˈɲit͡sa ˈvɨʐna] is a village in the administrative district of Gmina Baligród, within Lesko County, Subcarpathian Voivodeship, in south-eastern Poland.
