= Łubne =

- Village
- Location within Poland
- Coordinates: 49°23′32″N 22°15′54″E
- Country: Poland
- Voivodeship: Podkarpackie
- County: Lesko
- Gmina: Baligród

Łubne [ˈwubnɛ] is a former village in the administrative district of Gmina Baligród, within Lesko County, Podkarpackie Voivodeship, in south-eastern Poland.

== Etymology ==
The name of Łubne comes from łub, a regional term for tree bark.

== Location and characteristics ==
The village was located 4 kilometres (2.5 mi) south of Baligród. It is located on the shores of the Jabłonka, a small stream. Features of the village include remnants of an old manor house and a nature reserve, "Yews on the Jawor mountain" (Polish: Cisy na górze Jawor). A quarry of interest to geologists is found on the slopes of that mountain.

== History ==
The town's name was first mentioned in a 1598 document concerning land allocation. During Operation Vistula, it was completely depopulated.

=== Historical demographics ===
As of 1921, 88 people lived in the 14 homes of Łubne. Of the 88 inhabitants, 87 were Greek Catholics and 1 was Roman Catholic.
