= Kołonice, Podkarpackie Voivodeship =

Kołonice
- Village
- Location within Poland
- Coordinates: 49°15′53″N 22°15′22″E
- Country: Poland
- Voivodeship: Subcarpathian
- County: Lesko
- Gmina: Baligród

Kołonice [kɔwɔˈɲit͡sɛ] is a village in the administrative district of Gmina Baligród, within Lesko County, Subcarpathian Voivodeship, in south-eastern Poland.

The closest public airport is Uzhhorod International Airport in Ukraine, approximately 72 km (45 mi) from Kolonice.
