= Bystre =

Bystre may refer to the following places in Poland:

- Bystre, Lower Silesian Voivodeship (south-west Poland)
- Bystre, Podlaskie Voivodeship (north-east Poland)
- Bystre, Lesko County in Subcarpathian Voivodeship (south-east Poland)
- Bystre, Nisko County in Subcarpathian Voivodeship (south-east Poland)
- Bystre, Bieszczady County in Subcarpathian Voivodeship (south-east Poland)

== See also ==
- Bystré (disambiguation)
