= Cisowiec =

- Village
- Location within Poland
- Coordinates: 49°22′7″N 22°15′11″E
- Country: Poland
- Voivodeship: Subcarpathian
- County: Lesko
- Gmina: Baligród

Cisowiec [t͡ɕiˈsɔvʲɛt͡s] is a village in the administrative district of Gmina Baligród, within Lesko County, Subcarpathian Voivodeship, in south-eastern Poland.
