= Pikui =

Mountain in Ukraine

- Пікуй
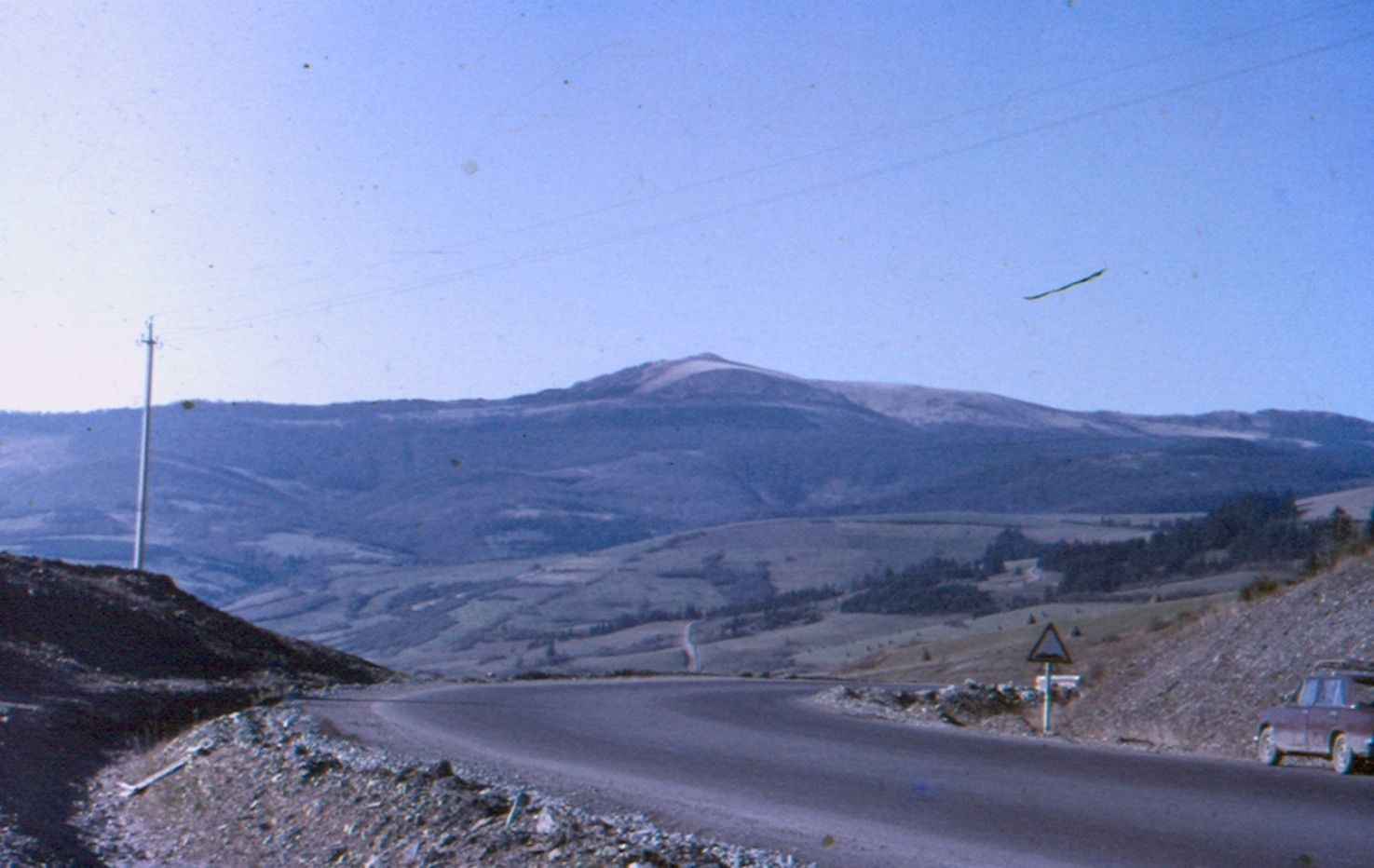
- The highest peak of Lviv Oblast

Highest point
- Elevation: 1,405 m (4,610 ft)
- Coordinates: 48°49′48″N 23°00′02″E

Geography
- Location within Zakarpattia Oblast Location within Ukraine
- Location: Lviv Oblast, Ukraine
- Country: Ukraine
- Parent range: Carpathian Mountains

Mount Pikui (Ukrainian: Пікуй) at 1,405 metres (4,610 ft), is the highest mountain in Lviv Oblast, Ukraine and part of the Carpathian Mountains, Stryi-San Highland, spine.

Located on the border of Lviv and Zakarpattia Oblast (regions). It is in the Watershed of the Beskids mountain range. Is part of the landscape reserve of national importance "Pikui".
The name of the mountains probably comes from a Thracian or Illyrian origin.
