= Stárkov =

- Town
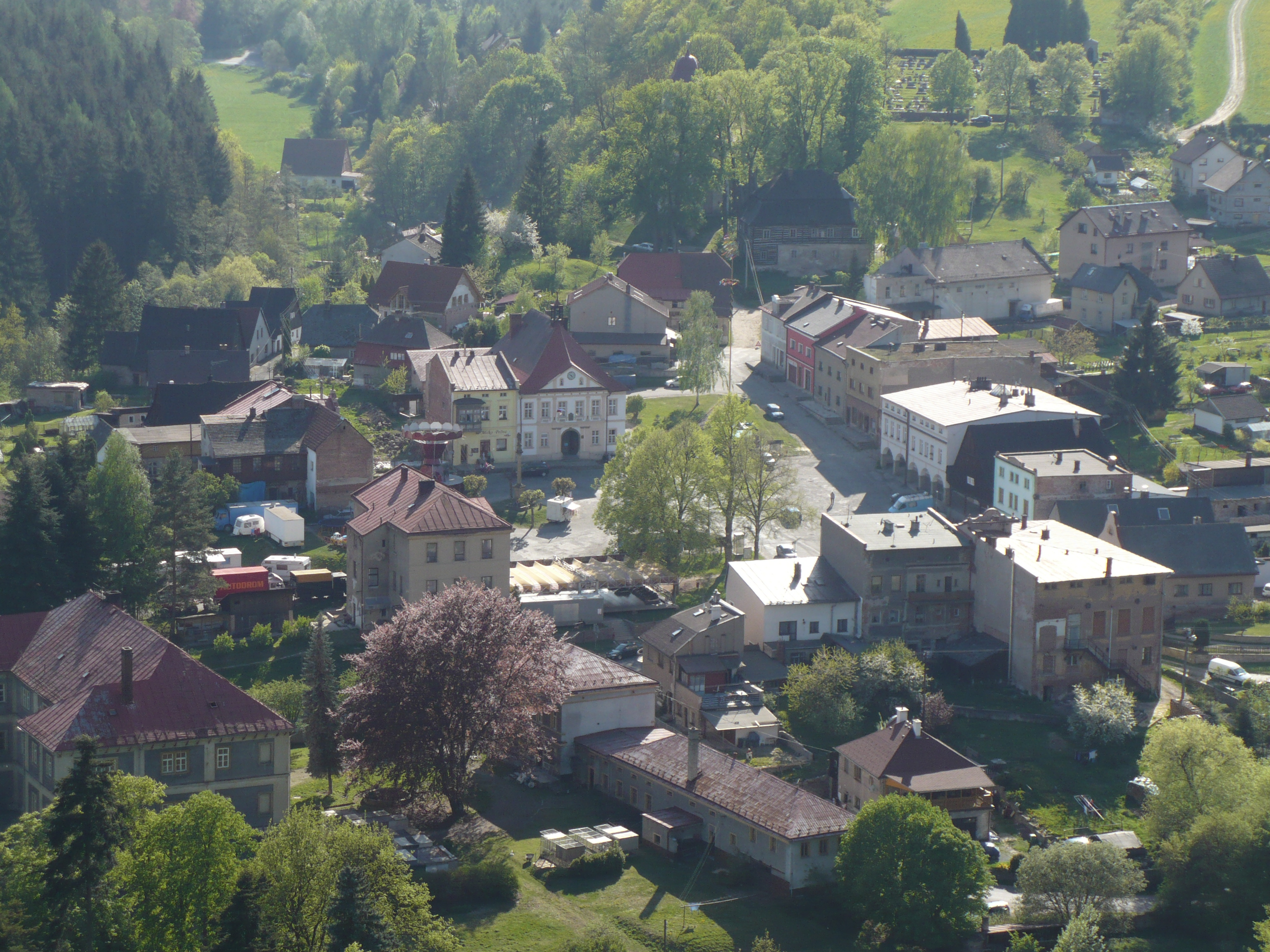
- Stárkov centre

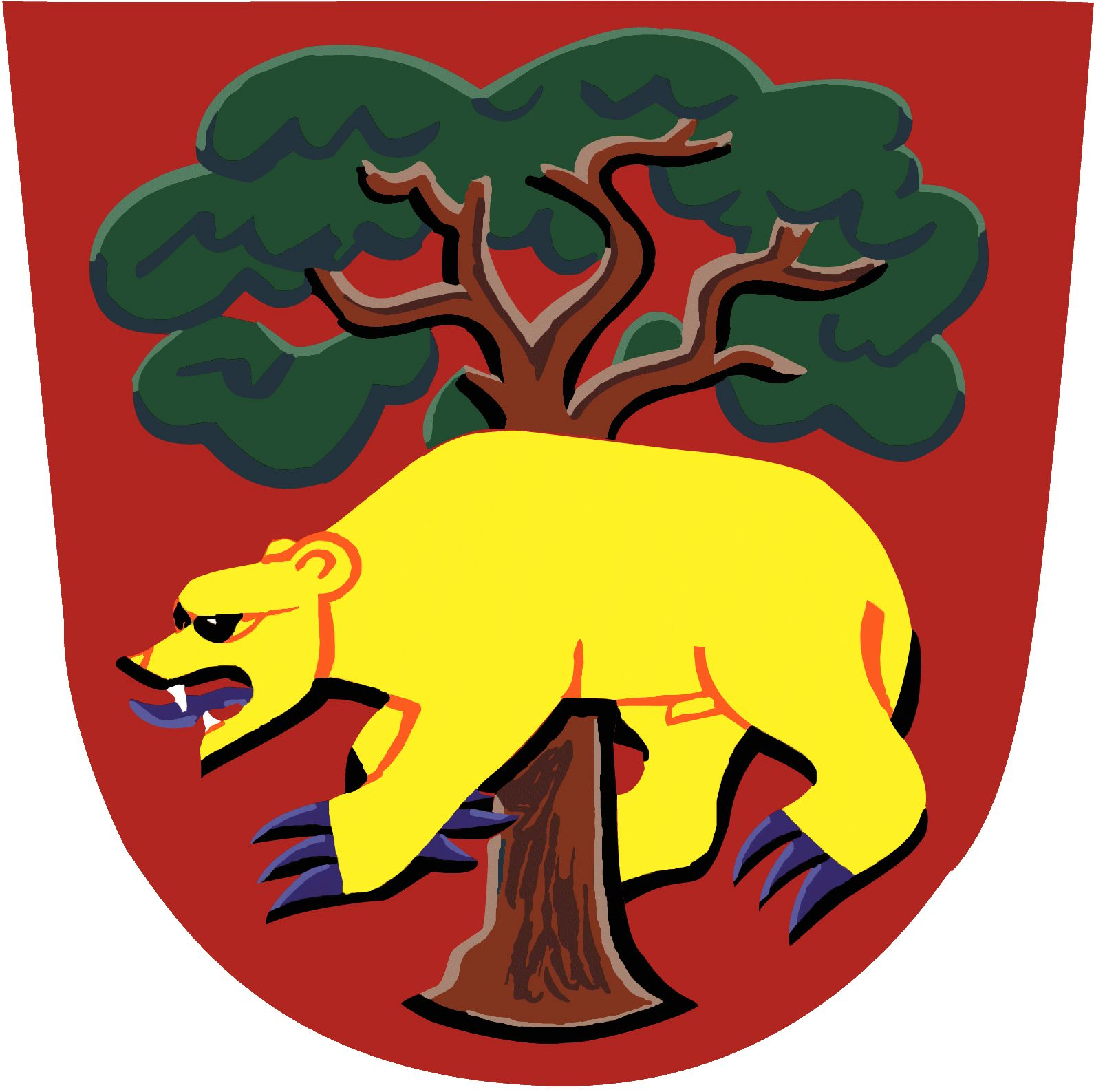
- Coat of arms

- Location in the Czech Republic
- Coordinates: 50°31′54″N 16°9′0″E
- Country: Czech Republic
- Region: Hradec Králové
- District: Náchod
- First mentioned: 1250

Government
  - Mayor: Petr Urban

Area
  - Total: 16.53 km^{2} (6.38 sq mi)
- Elevation: 441 m (1,447 ft)

Population (2026-01-01)
  - Total: 646
  - Density: 39.1/km^{2} (101/sq mi)
- Time zone: UTC+1 (CET)
  - Summer (DST): UTC+2 (CEST)
- Postal codes: 549 31, 549 36
- Website: www.starkov.cz

Stárkov (Czech pronunciation: [ˈstaːrkof]; German: Starkstadt) is a town in Náchod District in the Hradec Králové Region of the Czech Republic. It has about 600 inhabitants. The historic town centre is well preserved and is protected as an urban monument zone.

== Administrative division ==
Stárkov consists of five municipal parts (in brackets population according to the 2021 census):

- Stárkov (392)
- Bystré (90)
- Chlívce (41)
- Horní Dřevíč (75)
- Vápenka (15)

== Etymology ==
The name is derived either from the Czech surname Stárek or from the German surname Stark. In the oldest preserved written record, both the Czech and German names of the settlement appear.

== Geography ==
Stárkov is located about 13 kilometres (8 mi) north of Náchod and 27 km (17 mi) southwest of the Polish city of Wałbrzych. It lies in the Broumov Highlands, in the Broumovsko Protected Landscape Area. The Dřevíč Stream flows through the town.

== History ==
The first written mention of Stárkov is from 1250. It was probably founded in the first half of the 13th century during the colonisation of forests in this region. The name Stárkov was first used in 1321. In 1573, Stárkov was promoted to a town.

== Demographics ==
Historical population

Year	Pop.	±%
1869	3,079	—
1880	2,881	−6.4%
1890	2,732	−5.2%
1900	2,604	−4.7%
1910	2,279	−12.5%

Year	Pop.	±%
1921	2,047	−10.2%
1930	1,843	−10.0%
1950	1,267	−31.3%
1961	1,302	+2.8%
1970	1,167	−10.4%

Year	Pop.	±%
1980	976	−16.4%
1991	777	−20.4%
2001	736	−5.3%
2011	628	−14.7%
2021	613	−2.4%

Source: Censuses

== Transport ==
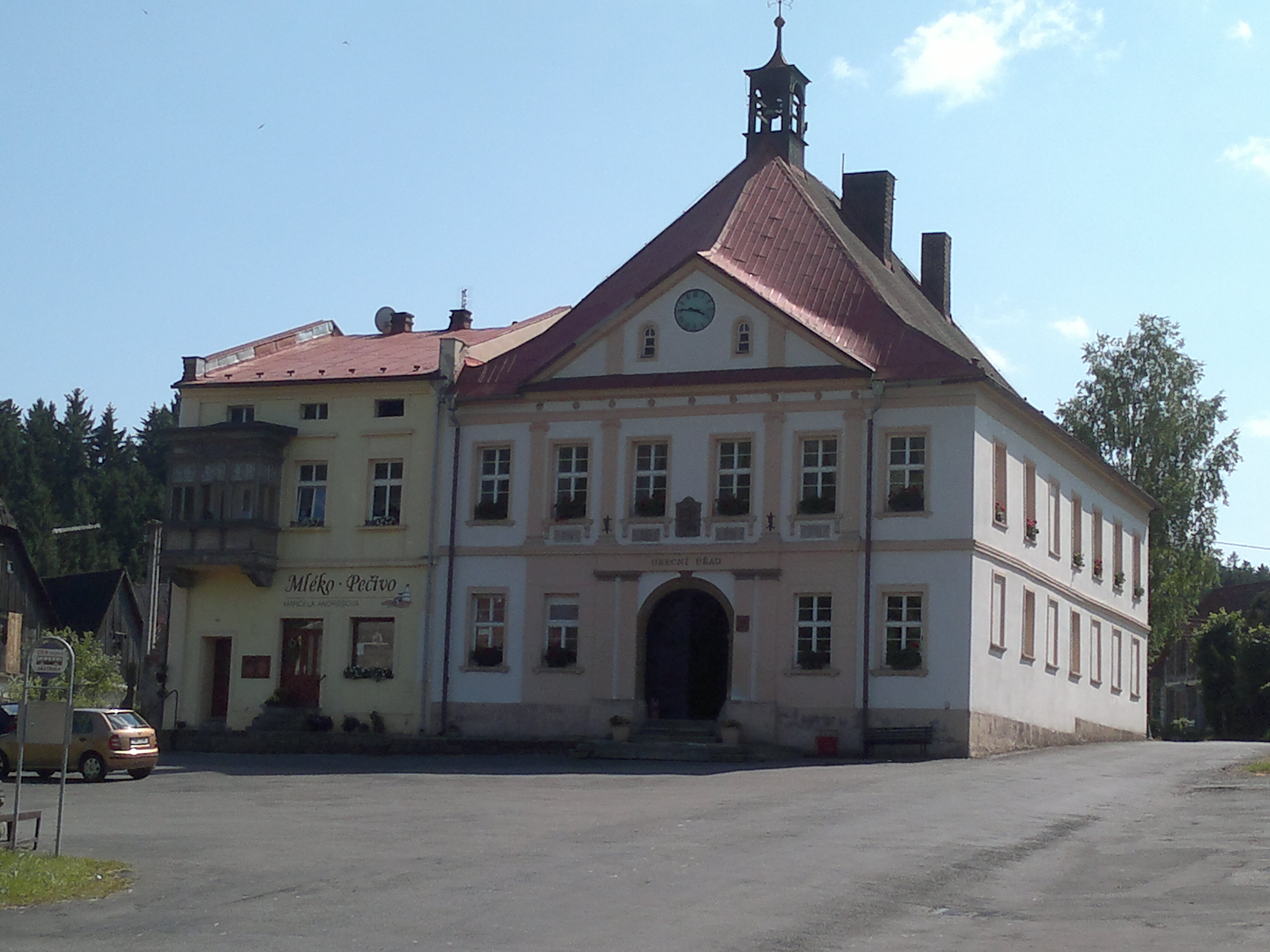
Town hall

There are no railways or major roads passing through the municipality.

== Sights ==
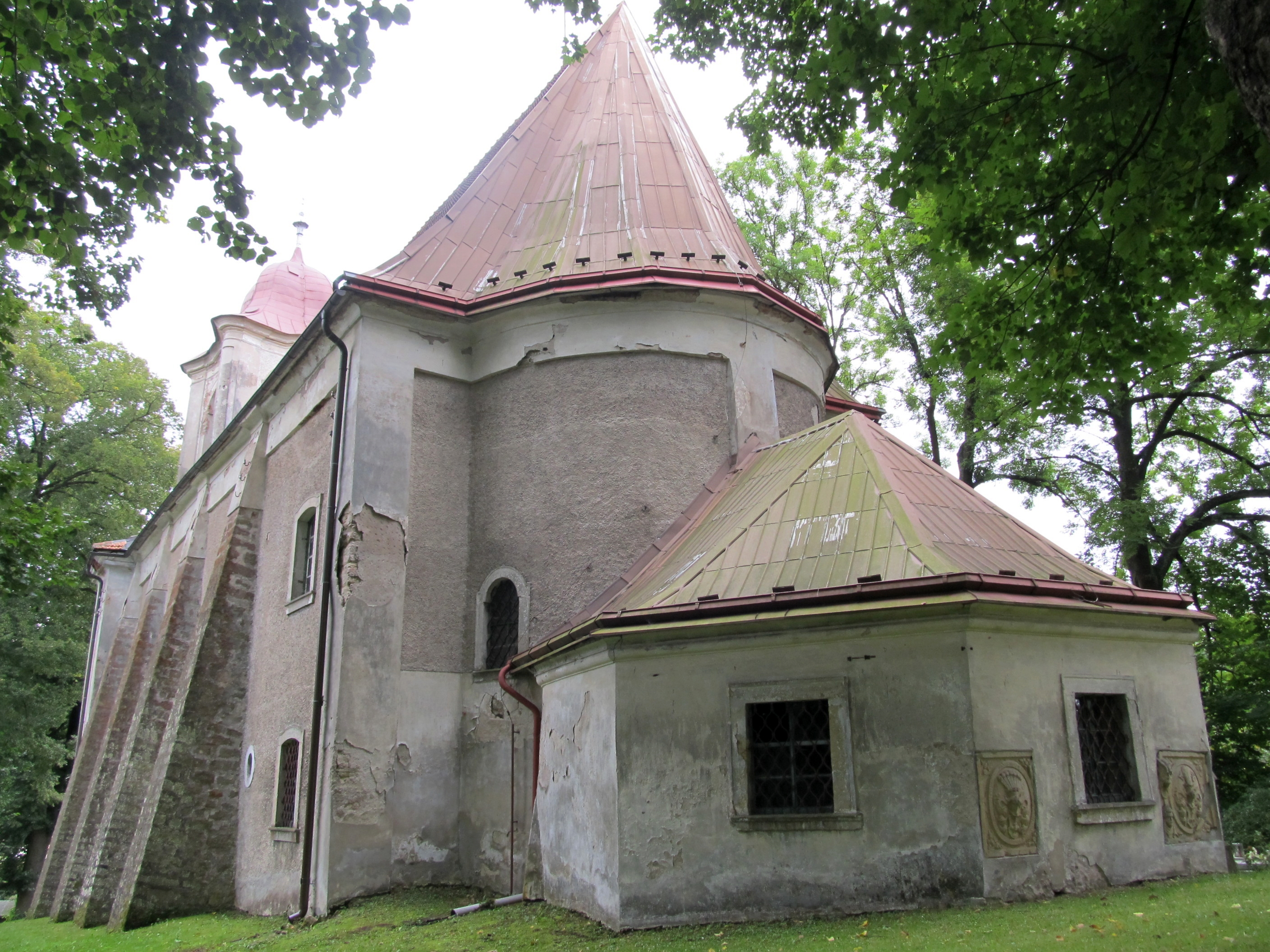
Church of Saint Joseph

The town hall is the main representative building of Stárkov and the landmark of the town square. The very first town hall is documented in 1575. The current town hall was built in 1854. The Baroque castle with gardens was originally built in 1546 and rebuilt in 1681–1691. Other sights on the square include historical houses, a Neoclassical fountain and a Marian column from 1726.

The Church of Saint Joseph was built in 1654–1662, when it replaced an old church destroyed by a fire. The tower was added in 1765. The rectory from 1575 was restored in 1660. There is the Chapel of Fourteen Holy Helpers on a hill above the town. The way from the church to the chapel is lined with the Stations of the Cross.
