= Bystre, Lesko County =

Bystre
- Village
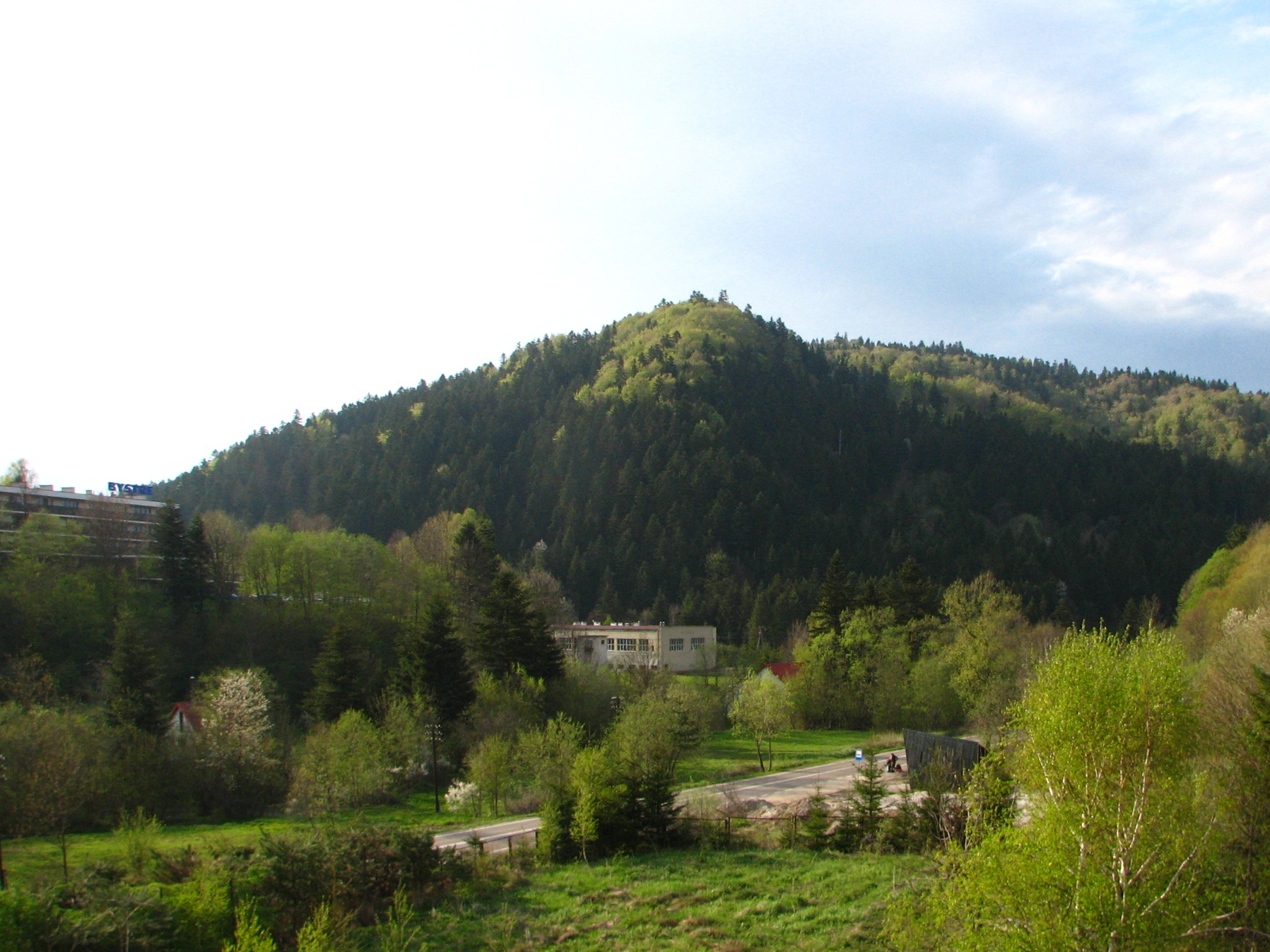

- Location within Poland
- Coordinates: 49°18′N 22°16′E
- Country: Poland
- Voivodeship: Subcarpathian
- County: Lesko
- Gmina: Baligród
- Time zone: UTC+1 (CET)
  - Summer (DST): UTC+2 (CEST)

Bystre [ˈbɨstrɛ] is a village in the administrative district of Gmina Baligród, within Lesko County, Subcarpathian Voivodeship, in south-eastern Poland.
