= Bystré, Vranov nad Topľou District =

Bystré
- Municipality
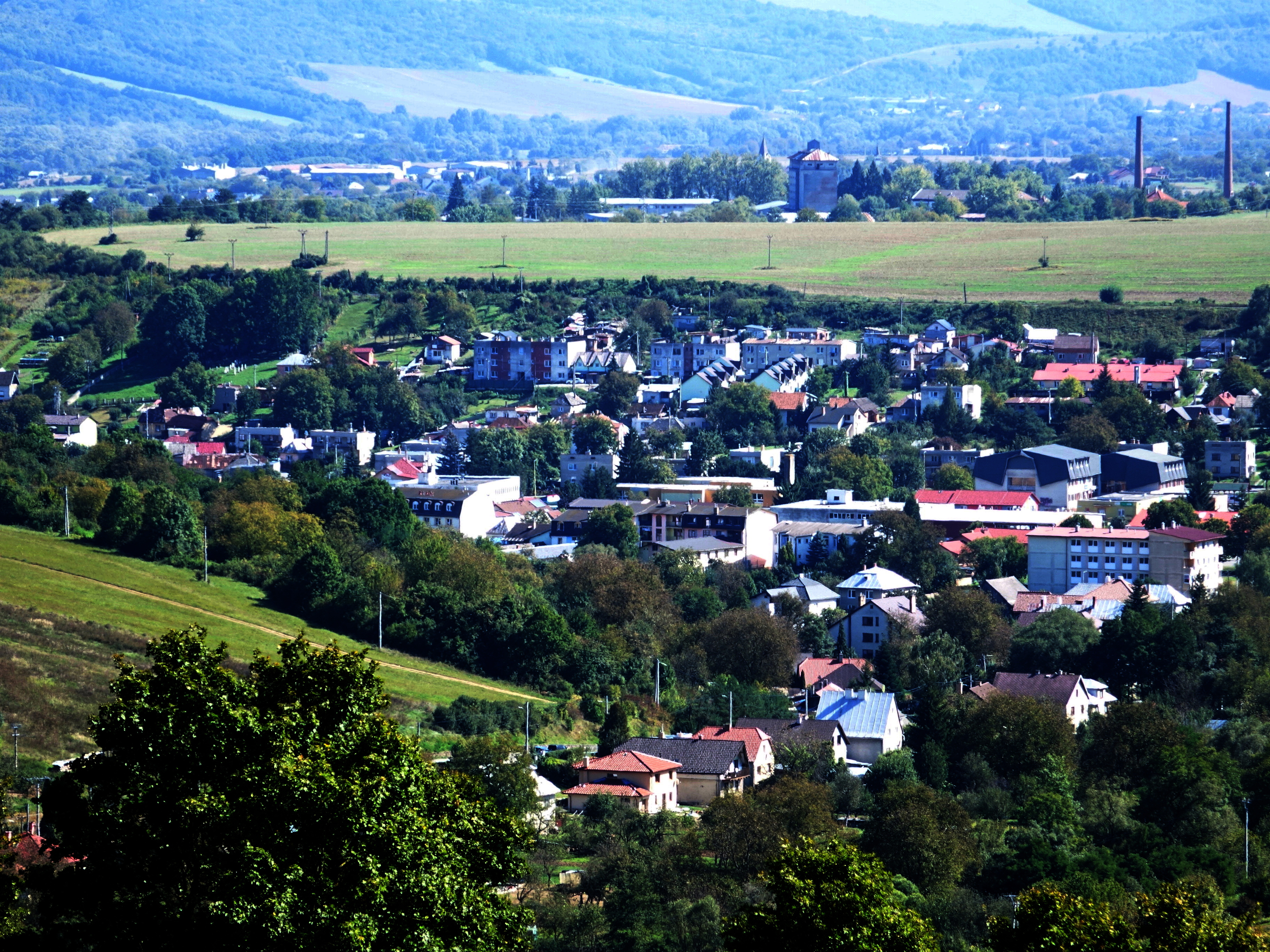

- Flag

- Location of Bystré in the Prešov Region Location of Bystré in Slovakia
- Coordinates: 49°01′N 21°33′E
- Country: Slovakia
- Region: Prešov Region
- District: Vranov nad Topľou District
- First mentioned: 1312

Area
  - Total: 13.21 km^{2} (5.10 sq mi)
- Elevation: 180 m (590 ft)

Population (2025)
  - Total: 2,755
- Time zone: UTC+1 (CET)
  - Summer (DST): UTC+2 (CEST)
- Postal code: 943 4
- Area code: +421 57
- Vehicle registration plate (until 2022): VT
- Website: www.obecbystre.sk

Bystré (Hungarian: Tapolybeszterce, until 1899: Tapolybisztra) is a village and municipality in Vranov nad Topľou District in the Prešov Region of eastern Slovakia.

== History ==
In historical records, the village was first mentioned in 1312. Bystré is also the birthplace of writer, poet and dramaturge Albert Marenčin.

== Geography ==
The municipality lies at an altitude of 180 metres (590 ft) and covers an area of 13.21 km^{2} (5.10 sq mi) (2025).

== Population ==
Population statistic (10 years)
Year	1995	2005	2015	2025
Count	2606	2676	2703	2755
Difference		+2.68%	+1.00%	+1.92%

Population statistic
Year	2024	2025
Count	2766	2755
Difference		−0.39%

It has a population of 2755 people (31 December 2025).

=== Ethnicity ===
Census 2021 (1+ %)
Ethnicity	Number	Fraction
Slovak	2643	96.28%
Romani	159	5.79%
Not found out	51	1.85%
Total	2745	

In year 2021 was 2745 people by ethnicity 2643 as Slovak, 159 as Romani, 51 as Not found out, 23 as Czech, 16 as Rusyn, 11 as Other, 6 as Romanian, 6 as Hungarian, 4 as Polish, 3 as English, 2 as Ukrainian, 2 as Italian, 1 as Turkish, 1 as Russian, 1 as Austrian, 1 as German, 1 as Greek and 1 as Croatian.

Note on population: The difference values of population numbers in the table "Population statistic" and in the sections "Ethnicity" & "Religion" is caused by the use of various statistical methods.

==== Jewish community ====
Historically, the town was once home to between 80 and 110 Jews. In 1828, there were 100 Jews living there. The community had a synagogue, cemetery, mikveh, cheder, and employed a religious teacher/ritual slaughterer who also served several neighbouring communities. By the latter half of the 19th century, the number of Jews in the village was diminishing, as young people moved to larger cities. At the beginning of the 20th century, about 100 Jews still remained in the village, and by 1940, only 70 remained. In 1942, most of the remaining Jews were sent to extermination camps. After liberation, no Jews returned to settle in the village.

=== Religion ===
Census 2021 (1+ %)
Religion	Number	Fraction
Roman Catholic Church	1750	63.75%
Evangelical Church	611	22.26%
Greek Catholic Church	198	7.21%
None	98	3.57%
Not found out	28	1.02%
Total	2745	

In year 2021 was 2745 people by religion 1750 from Roman Catholic Church, 611 from Evangelical Church, 198 from Greek Catholic Church, 98 from None, 28 from Not found out, 19 from Church of the Brethren, 18 from Jehovah's Witnesses, 6 from Apostolic Church, 4 from Eastern Orthodox Church, 4 from Other, 2 from Other and not ascertained christian church, 2 from Christian Congregations in Slovakia, 2 from Islam, 2 from Ad hoc movements and 1 from Calvinist Church.

== See also ==
- List of municipalities and towns in Slovakia

== Genealogical resources ==
The records for genealogical research are available at the state archive "Statny Archiv in Presov, Slovakia"

- Roman Catholic church records (births/marriages/deaths): 1853-1910 (parish B)
- Greek Catholic church records (births/marriages/deaths): 1803-1942 (parish B)
