= Gmina Baligród =

Gmina Baligród Baligród Commune
- Gmina
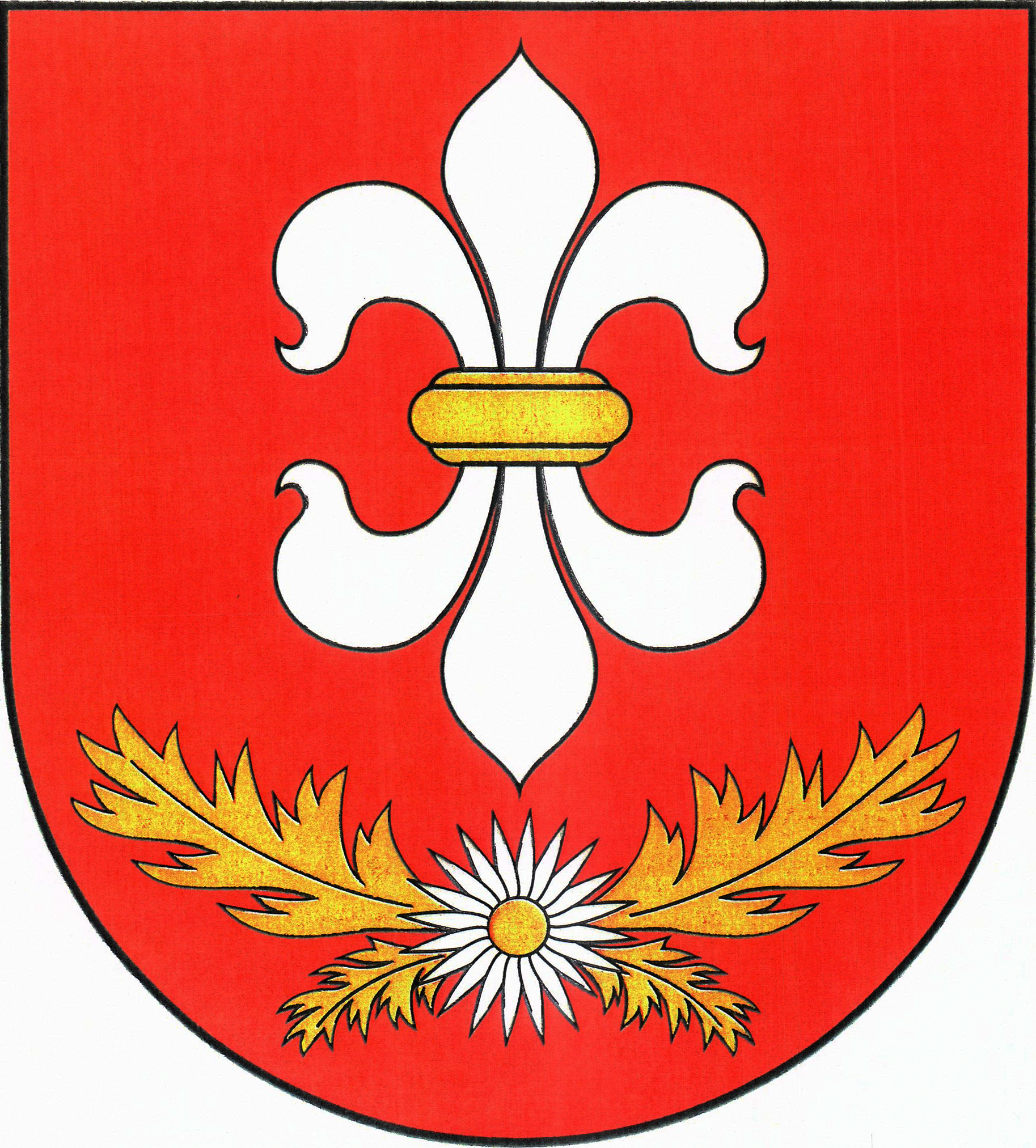
- Coat of arms
- Interactive map of Gmina Baligród
- Coordinates (Baligród): 49°21′0″N 22°17′0″E
- Country: Poland
- Voivodeship: Subcarpathian
- County: Lesko
- Seat: Baligród

Area
  - Total: 158.12 km^{2} (61.05 sq mi)

Population (2006)
  - Total: 3,176
  - Density: 20.09/km^{2} (52.02/sq mi)
- Website: http://www.baligrod.pl

Gmina Baligród is a rural gmina (administrative district) in Lesko County, Subcarpathian Voivodeship, in south-eastern Poland. Its seat is the village of Baligród, which lies approximately 15 kilometres (9 mi) south of Lesko and 79 km (49 mi) south of the regional capital Rzeszów.

The gmina covers an area of 158.12 square kilometres (61.1 sq mi), and as of 2006 its total population is 3,176.

The gmina contains part of the protected area called Cisna-Wetlina Landscape Park.

== Villages ==
Gmina Baligród contains the villages and settlements of Baligród, Bystre, Cisowiec, Jabłonki, Kiełczawa, Kołonice, Łubne, Mchawa, Nowosiółki, Rabe, Roztoki Dolne, Stężnica, Zahoczewie, Żerdenka, Żernica Niżna and Żernica Wyżna.

== Neighbouring gminas ==
Gmina Baligród is bordered by the gminas of Cisna, Komańcza, Lesko, Solina and Zagórz.

== Rural landscape picture ==
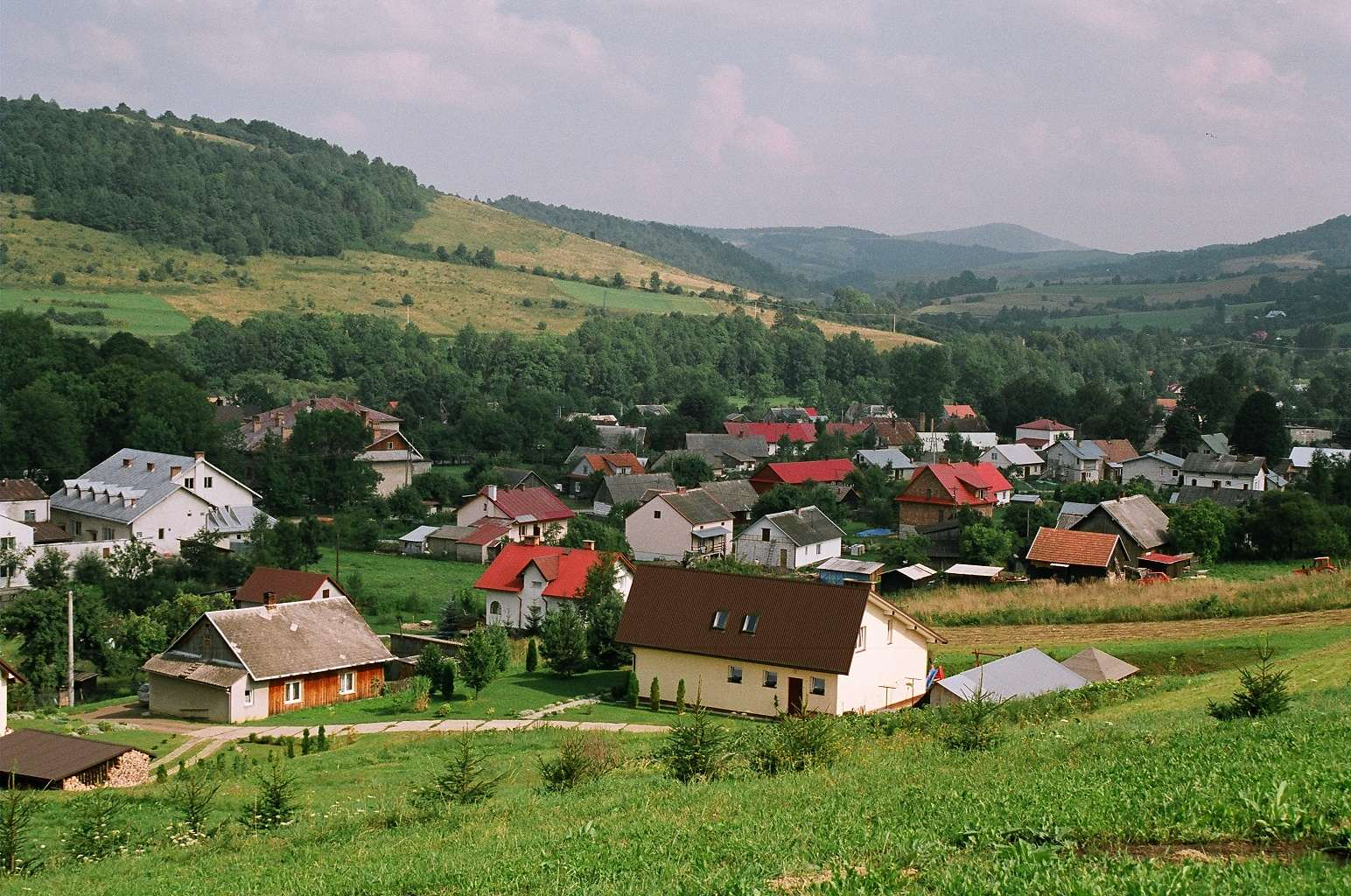

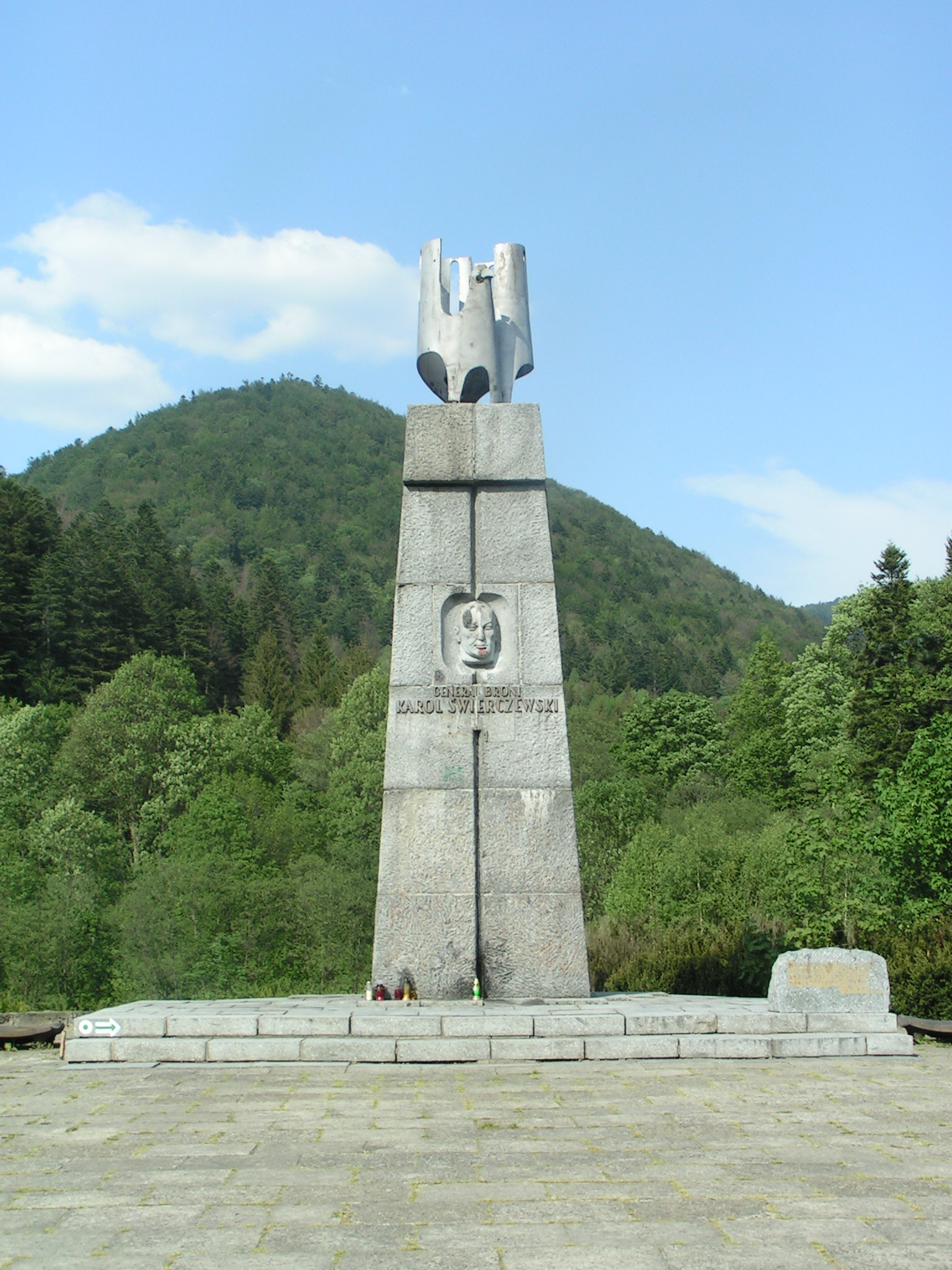

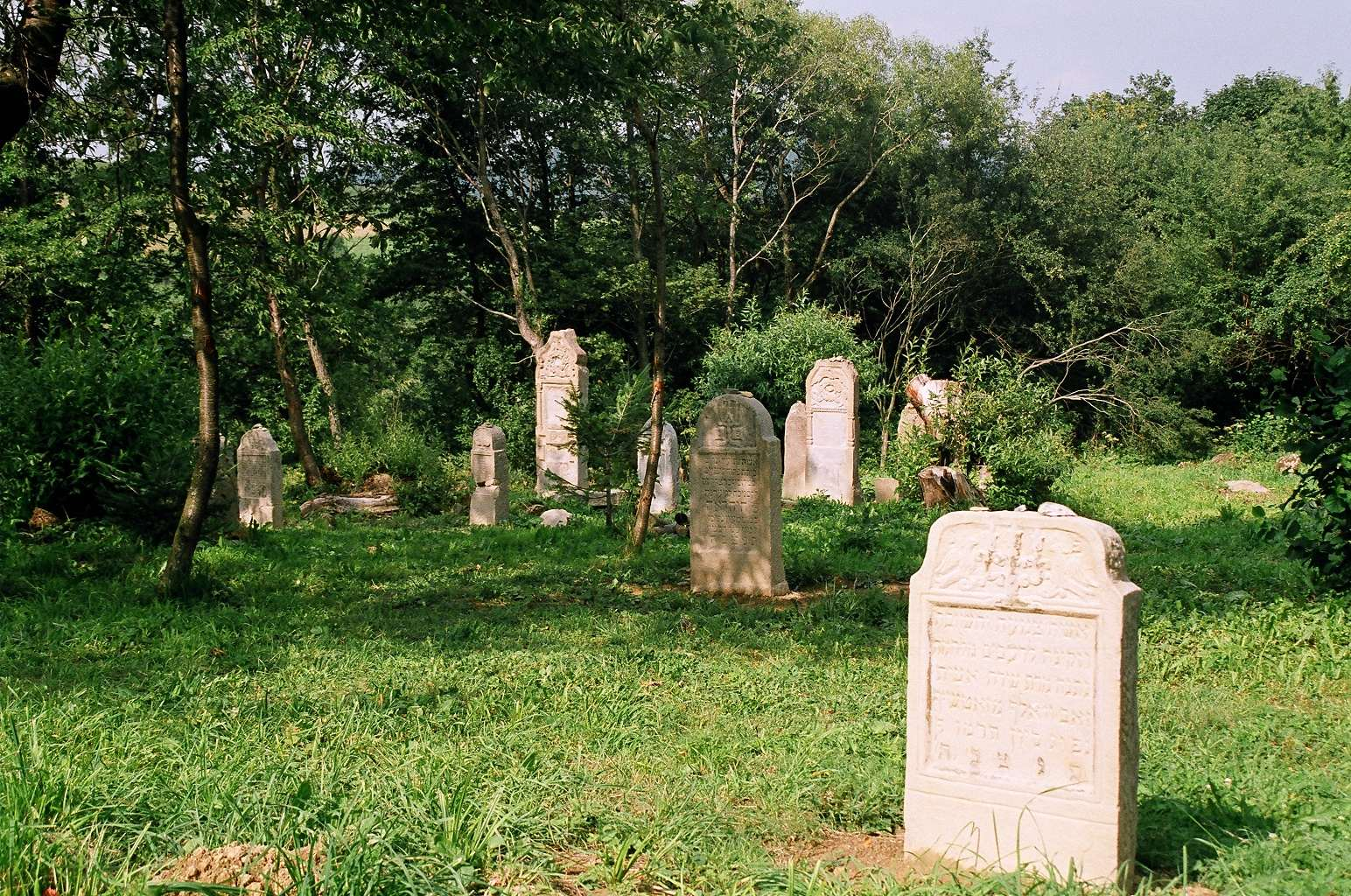
