= Malý Šariš =

Village and municipality in Slovakia

- Municipality
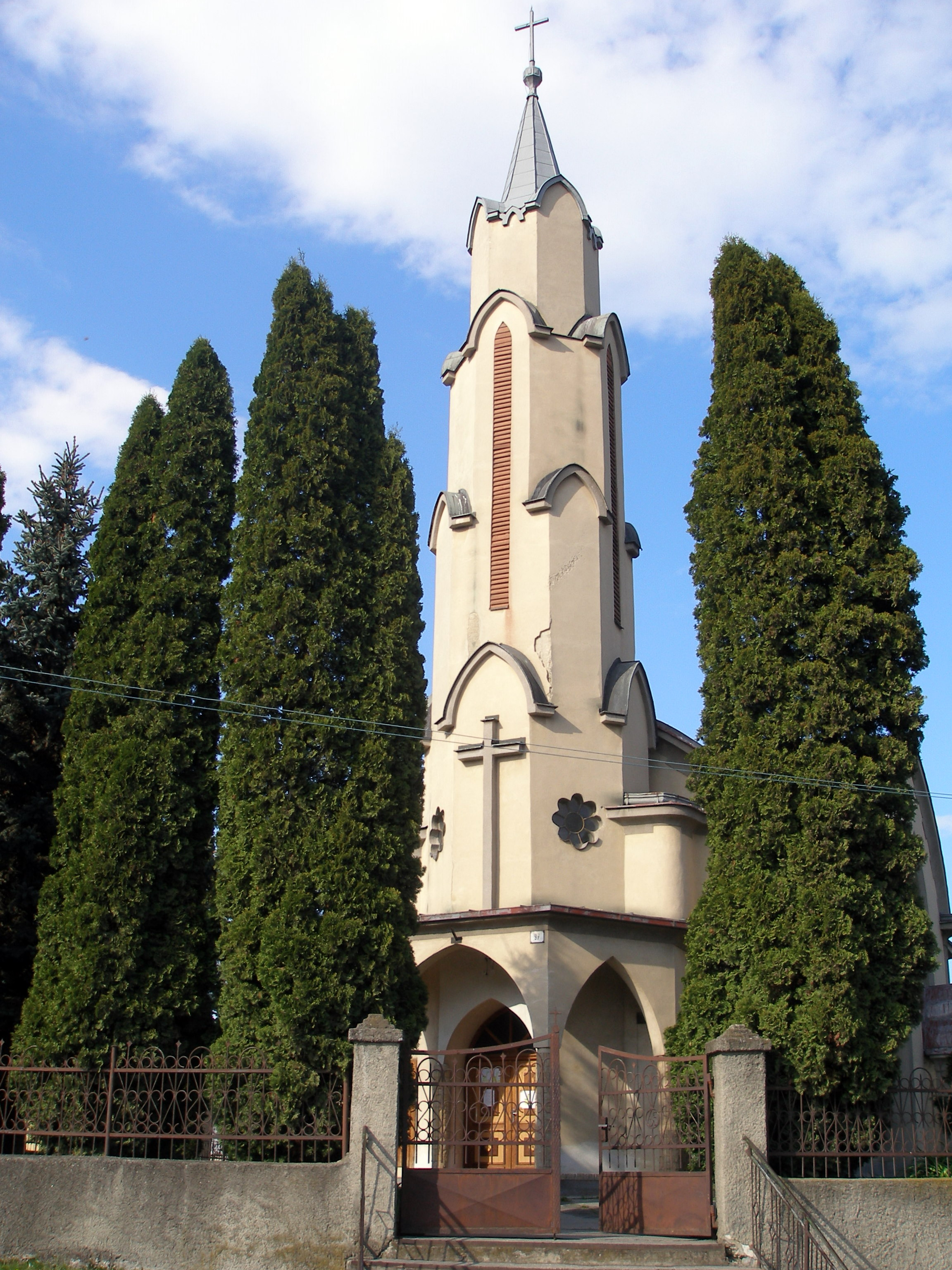

- Flag

- Location of Malý Šariš in the Prešov Region Location of Malý Šariš in Slovakia
- Coordinates: 49.02°N 21.18°E
- Country: Slovakia
- Region: Prešov Region
- District: Prešov District
- First mentioned: 1248

Area
  - Total: 8.61 km^{2} (3.32 sq mi)
- Elevation: 295 m (968 ft)

Population (2025)
  - Total: 1,901
- Time zone: UTC+1 (CET)
  - Summer (DST): UTC+2 (CEST)
- Postal code: 800 1
- Area code: +421 51
- Vehicle registration plate (until 2022): PO
- Website: www.malysaris.sk

Malý Šariš is a village and municipality in Prešov District in the Prešov Region of eastern Slovakia.

== History ==
In historical records the village was first mentioned in 1248. However, it was founded probably before the 13th century because it was described as a developed village. The village was owned by the king until 1430s (except a short period in the 14 century). In 1439, it was given to the noblemen from Perín

Malý Šariš belonged to the largest villages in the Sáros (Šariš) County, but its size gradually diminished and it became an average village before the end of the 16th century.

== Geography ==
The municipality lies at an altitude of 295 metres (968 ft) and covers an area of 8.61 km^{2} (3.32 sq mi) (2025).

== Population ==
Population statistic (10 years)
Year	1995	2005	2015	2025
Count	1309	1365	1629	1901
Difference		+4.27%	+19.34%	+16.69%

Population statistic
Year	2024	2025
Count	1903	1901
Difference		−0.10%

It has a population of 1901 people (31 December 2025).

=== Ethnicity ===
Census 2021 (1+ %)
Ethnicity	Number	Fraction
Slovak	1703	97.53%
Not found out	30	1.71%
Total	1746	

In year 2021 was 1746 people by ethnicity 1703 as Slovak, 30 as Not found out, 15 as Ukrainian, 12 as Rusyn, 9 as Czech, 5 as Other, 3 as Greek, 2 as Irish, 1 as Hungarian and 1 as Croatian.

Note on population: The difference values of population numbers in the table "Population statistic" and in the sections "Ethnicity" & "Religion" is caused by the use of various statistical methods.

=== Religion ===
Census 2021 (1+ %)
Religion	Number	Fraction
Roman Catholic Church	1323	75.77%
Evangelical Church	153	8.76%
None	121	6.93%
Greek Catholic Church	67	3.84%
Not found out	40	2.29%
Total	1746	

In year 2021 was 1746 people by religion 1323 from Roman Catholic Church, 153 from Evangelical Church, 121 from None, 67 from Greek Catholic Church, 40 from Not found out, 10 from Church of the Brethren, 10 from Ad hoc movements, 9 from Eastern Orthodox Church, 6 from Calvinist Church, 3 from Other and not ascertained christian church, 2 from Other, 1 from Paganism and natural spirituality and 1 from United Methodist Church.
