= Bystré (Rychnov nad Kněžnou District) =

- Municipality
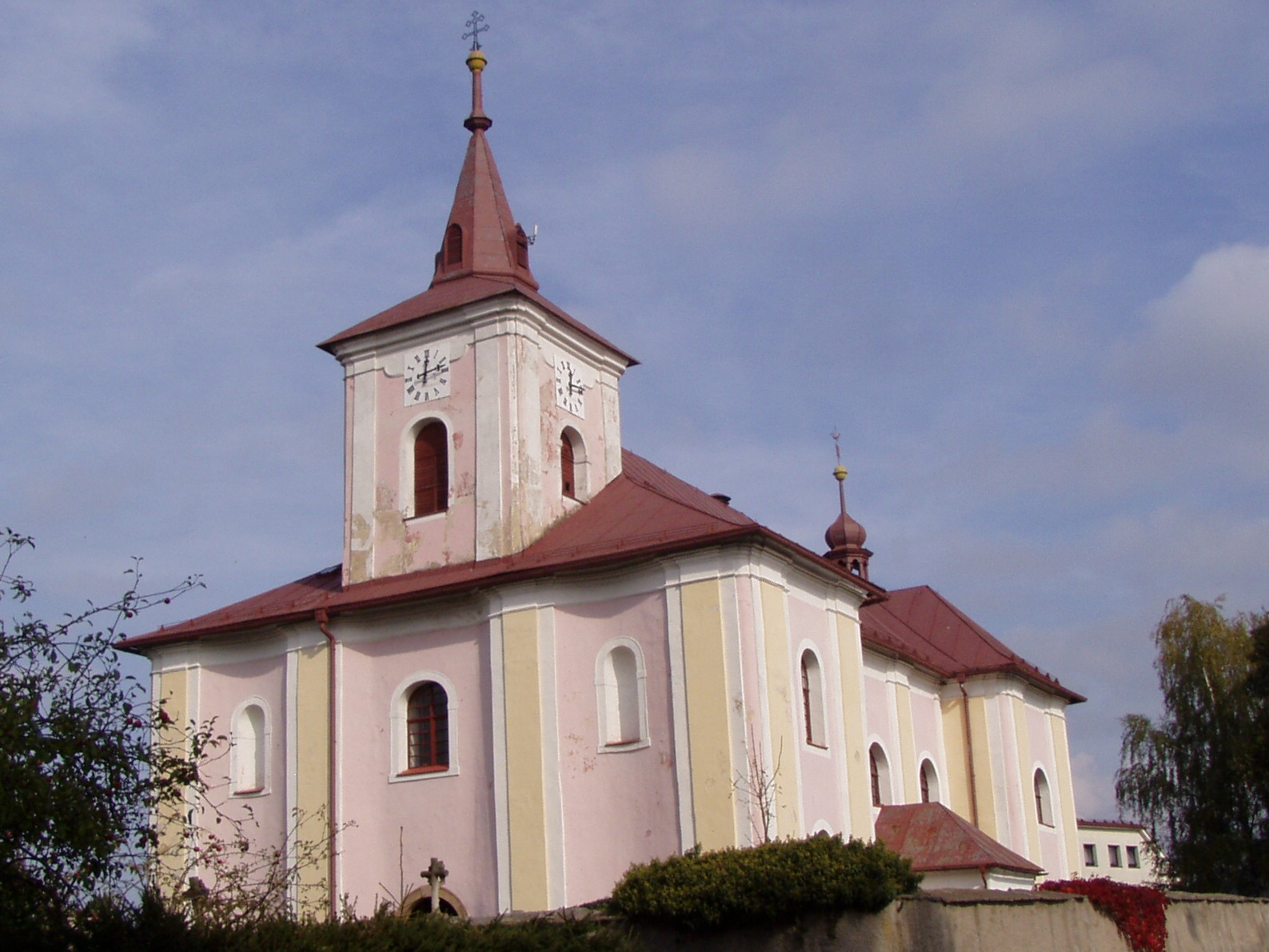
- Church of Saint Bartholomew

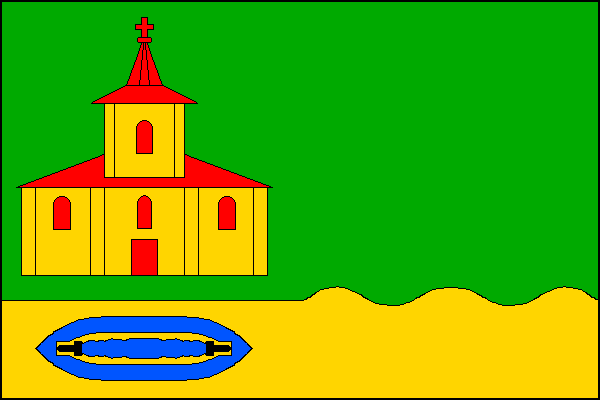
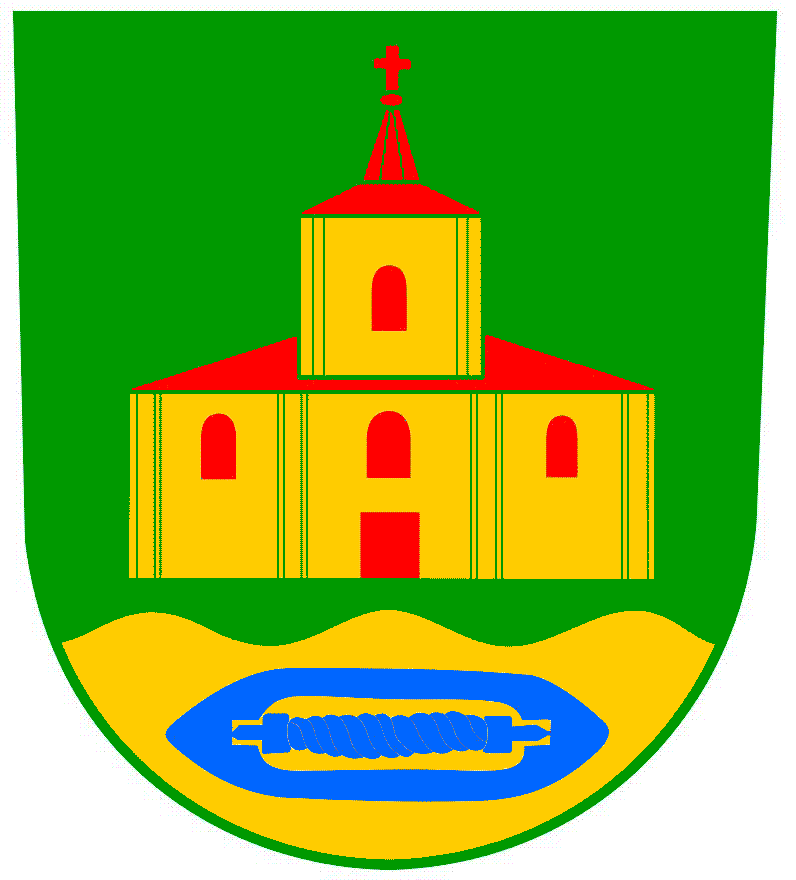
- Flag Coat of arms

- Location in the Czech Republic
- Coordinates: 50°19′17″N 16°15′19″E
- Country: Czech Republic
- Region: Hradec Králové
- District: Rychnov nad Kněžnou
- First mentioned: 1475

Area
  - Total: 3.29 km^{2} (1.27 sq mi)
- Elevation: 543 m (1,781 ft)

Population (2026-01-01)
  - Total: 269
  - Density: 81.8/km^{2} (212/sq mi)
- Time zone: UTC+1 (CET)
  - Summer (DST): UTC+2 (CEST)
- Postal code: 518 01
- Website: www.obecbystre.cz

Bystré is a municipality and village in Rychnov nad Kněžnou District in the Hradec Králové Region of the Czech Republic. It has about 300 inhabitants.

== Etymology ==
The adjective bystrý ('fast-flowing', 'rapid' in older Czech) was often included in the names of streams. This also applied to the local stream, from which the name was transferred to the settlement.

== Demographics ==
Historical population
| Year | Pop. | ±% |
|---|---|---|
| 1869 | 448 | — |
| 1880 | 507 | +13.2% |
| 1890 | 557 | +9.9% |
| 1900 | 492 | −11.7% |
| 1910 | 494 | +0.4% |
| 1921 | 433 | −12.3% |
| 1930 | 491 | +13.4% |
| 1950 | 399 | −18.7% |
| 1961 | 367 | −8.0% |
| 1970 | 317 | −13.6% |
| 1980 | 252 | −20.5% |
| 1991 | 231 | −8.3% |
| 2001 | 216 | −6.5% |
| 2011 | 255 | +18.1% |
| 2021 | 258 | +1.2% |
Source: Censuses
