= Bieszczady Mountains =

Mountain range in Poland, Slovakia, and Ukraine

- Bieszczady, Beščady, Бещади, Besszádok
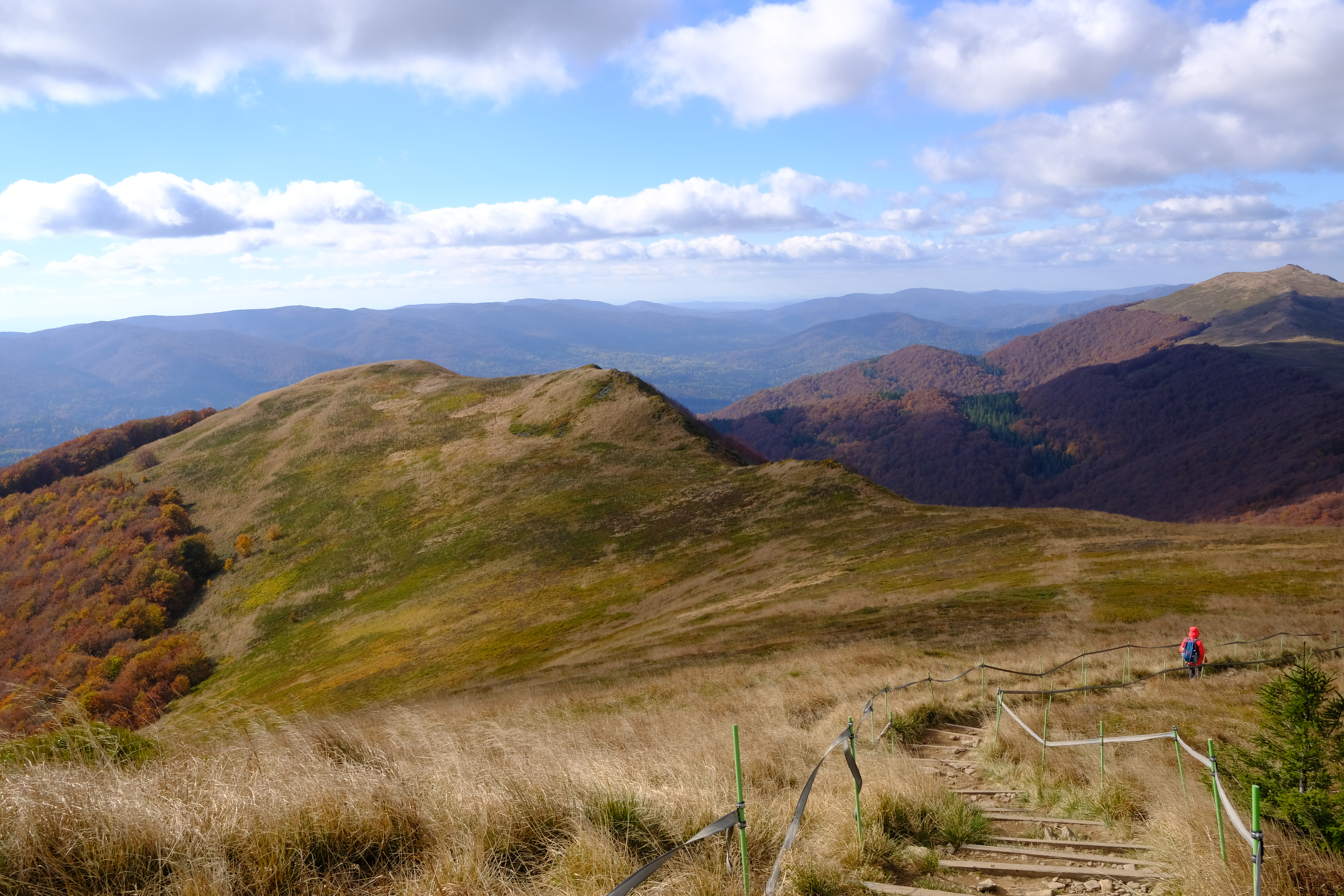
- The Bieszczady National Park, 2022

Highest point
- Peak: Pikui
- Elevation: 1,405 m (4,610 ft)

Geography
- Location of Bieszczady Mountains, marked in red color and labeled as C1
- Countries: Poland; Slovakia; Ukraine
- Regions/Voivodeships: Prešov; Subcarpathian
- Range coordinates: 49°17′N 22°29′E
- Parent range: Eastern Beskids
- Borders on: Lower Beskids; Pogórze Bukowskie

The Bieszczady Mountains (Polish: Bieszczady; Slovak: Beščady; Ukrainian: Бещади, romanized: Beshchady) are a mountain range found in the extreme southeast of Poland and northeast of Slovakia, as well as southwest of Ukraine. They are a part of the Eastern Beskids. Their highest peak is Pikui, situated in Ukraine, at 1,405 metres (4,610 ft), and the highest within the borders of Poland is Tarnica, at 1,346 metres (4,416 ft).

== Term ==
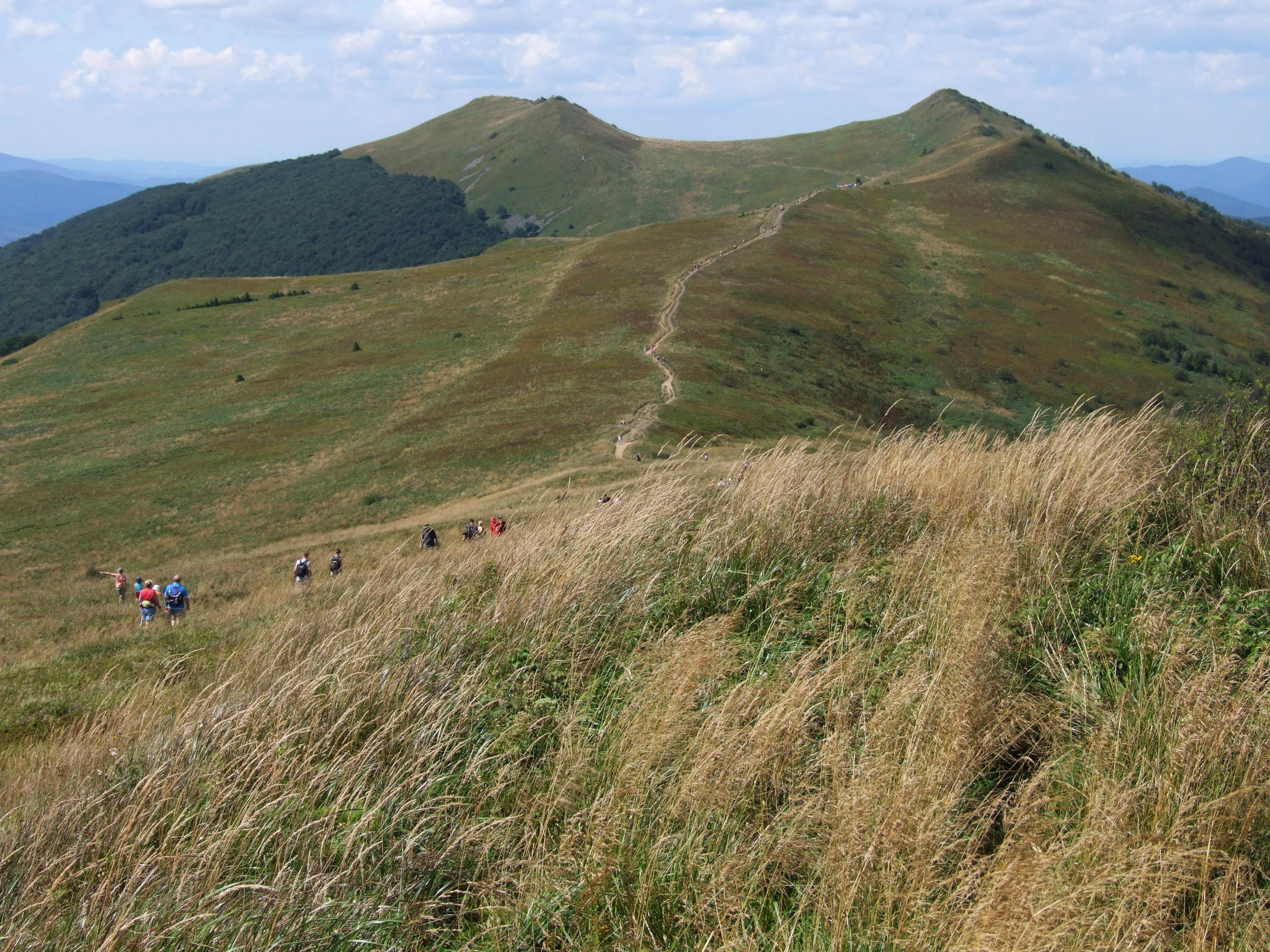
A typical trail on Połonina Wetlińska

The term Bieszczady has been introduced into English from Polish. In Poland, the term usually refers (in the narrower sense) to the Polish part of the Bieszczady region, while in the wider sense it can also refer to the entire region. In Slovakia, the Bieszczady region is known as Beščady, while the Slovak part of the region is called Bukovec Mountains (Slovak: Bukovské vrchy). In Ukraine, the Bieszczady region is known as Beshchady (Ukrainian: Бещади), while various parts of the region often have two or more name variants (unstable terminology), usually containing the word Beščady in combination with some other terms. Historically, the terms Bieszczady/Beščady/Beshchady have been used for hundreds of years to describe the mountains separating the old Kingdom of Hungary from Poland. A Latin language source of 1269 refers to them as "Beschad Alpes Poloniae" (translated as: Bieszczady Mountains of Poland).

The Polish folk etymology holds the term Bieszczady to have stemmed from the terms Bies and Czad (possibly from Chort) along with the Polish plural y stem giving Bies + czady + y. Some folk stories connect the origin of the mountains to the demonic activity of the Biesy and Czady, while other folk stories tell of the mountains being populated with hordes of Biesy and Czady, hence the name. Another less probable possibility is the term being related to Middle Low German beshêt, beskēt, meaning watershed.

== Division ==
Since there exist many variants of divisions of the mountain ranges and names for the Eastern Beskids (and Ukrainian Carpathians in general), several divisions are given in the following:

Division 1:

- Western Bieszczady (Polish: Bieszczady Zachodnie; Ukrainian: Західні Бещади, romanized: Zakhidni Beshchady) mainly in Poland and Slovakia, including the Bukovec Mountains (Slovak: Bukovské vrchy)
- Eastern Bieszczady (Polish: Bieszczady Wschodnie; Ukrainian: Східні Бещади, romanized: Skhidni Beshchady), mainly in Ukraine, stretching to the Skole Beskids (Polish: Beskidy Skolskie; Ukrainian: Сколівські Бескиди, romanized: Skolivs'ki Beskydy)

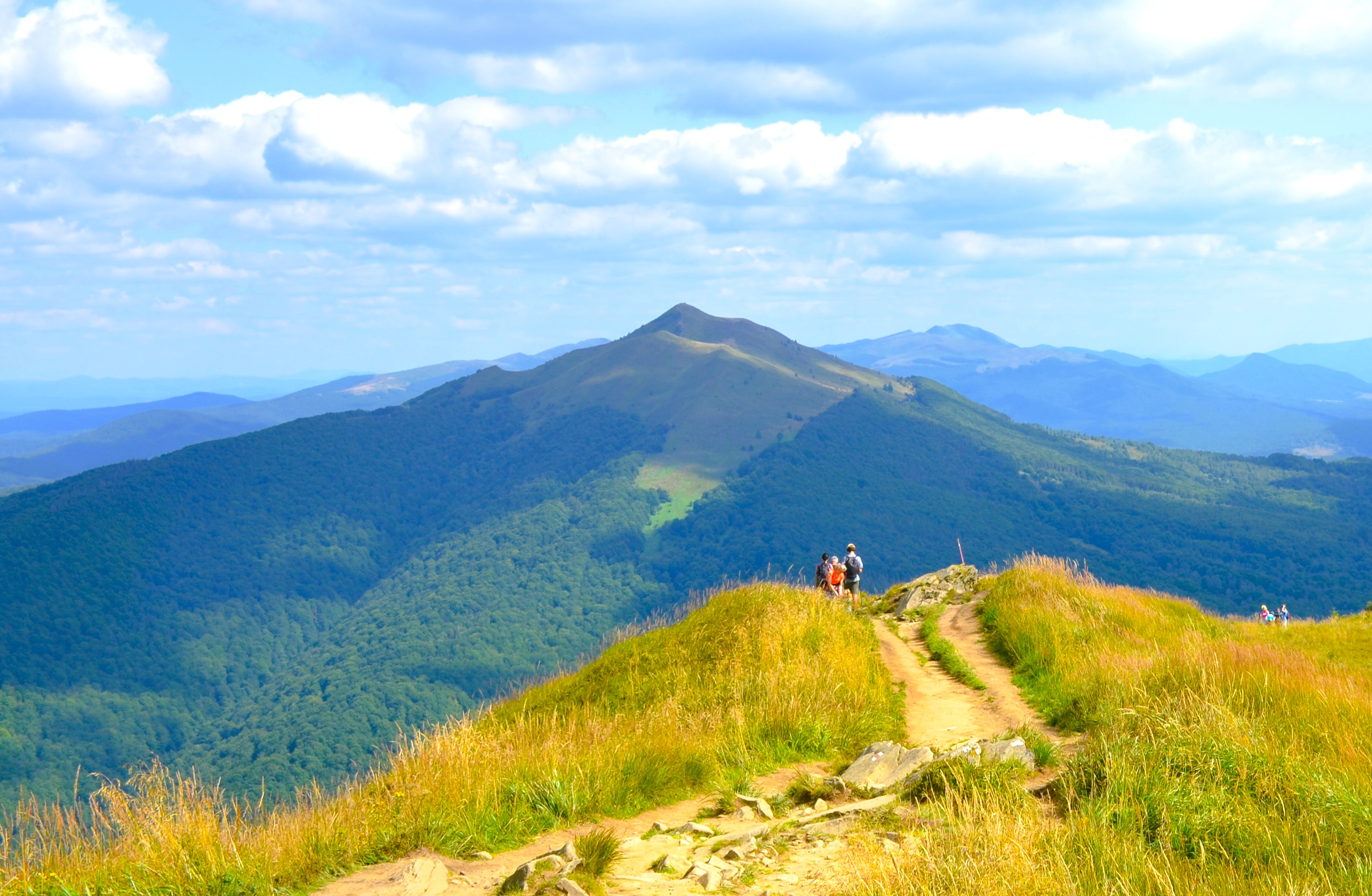
Bieszczady. A panoramic view from Połonina Wetlińska in the direction of Połonina Caryńska and Tarnica peaks.

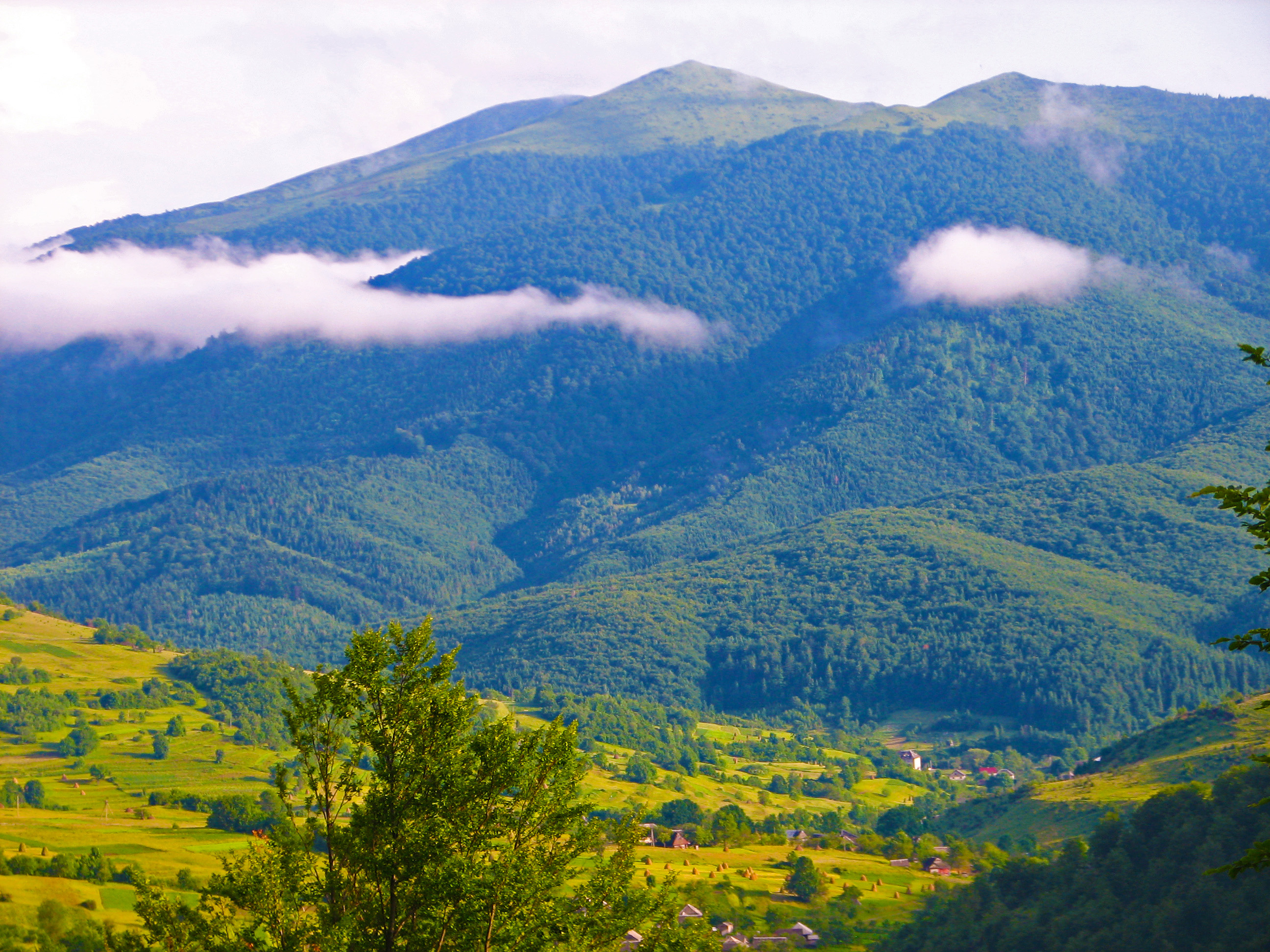
Mount Pikui, Ukraine. The highest mountain in Bieszczady Mountains.

Division 2:

- Western Bieszczady: between the Łupków Pass and the Użocka (Uzsok Pass - 853 m) with Mt Tarnica (1,346 m) as the highest peak; the Łupków Pass separating the Bieszczady from the Lower Beskids and Pogórze Bukowskie
- Central Bieszczady, between the Użocka Pass and the Tukholskyi Pass, with Mt Pikui (1405 m) as the highest peak
- Eastern Bieszczady, between the Tukholskyi Pass and the Vyshkovskyi Pass, with Mt Charna Repa (1228m) as the highest peak

Division 3: In an old Ukrainian division, what is defined here as the Bieszczady in a wider sense corresponds to the western part of the Mid-Carpathian Depression and to the westernmost part of the Polonynian Beskids.

== History ==
Settled in prehistoric times, the south-eastern Poland region that is now Bieszczady was overrun in pre-Roman times by various tribes, including the Celts, Goths and Vandals (Przeworsk culture and Puchov culture). After the fall of the Roman Empire, of which most of south-eastern Poland was part (all parts below the San), Hungarians and West Slavs invaded the area.

The region subsequently became part of the Great Moravian state. Upon the invasion of the Hungarian tribes into the heart of the Great Moravian Empire around 899, the Lendians of the area declared their allegiance to the Hungarians. The region then became a site of contention between Poland, Kievan Rus and Hungary starting in at least the 9th century. This area was mentioned for the first time in 981, when Vladimir the Great of Kievan Rus took the area over on the way into Poland. In 1018 it returned to Poland, 1031 back to Rus, in 1340 Casimir III of Poland recovered it.

Bieszczady was one of the strategically important areas of the Carpathian mountains bitterly contested in battles on the Eastern Front of World War I during the winter of 1914/1915.

Up until 1947, about 75% of the population of the Polish part of the Bieszczadzkie Mountains was Boyko. The killing of the Polish General Karol Świerczewski in Jabłonki by the Ukrainian Insurgent Army in 1947 was the direct cause of the replacement of the Boykos, the so-called Operation Vistula. The area was mostly uninhabited afterward. New Poles settled in the Bieszczady, joining the Poles living in the Bieszczady area before 1947, but the area became much less populated than before 1947. In 2002, then president Aleksander Kwaśniewski expressed regret for this operation.

In 1991, the UNESCO East Carpathian Biosphere Reserve was created that encapsulates a large part of the area and continues into Slovakia and Ukraine. It comprises the Bieszczady National Park (Poland), Poloniny National Park (Slovakia) and the Uzhansky National Nature Park (Ukraine). Animals living in this reserve include, among others, black storks, brown bears, wolves and bison.

== Hiking trails ==
- European walking route E8
  - Somár - sedlo Baba - Dolná Rakova - Končini - Brezová pod Bradlom - Polianka - Myjava - Veľká Javorina - Nové Mesto nad Váhom - Machnáč - Trenčín - Košecké Rovné - Fačkovské sedlo - Kunešov - Kraľová studňa - Donovaly - Chopok - Čertovica - Telgárt - Skalisko - Štós-kúpele - Skalisko - Chata Lajoška - Košice - Malý Šariš - Prešov - Miháľov - Kurimka - Dukla - Iwonicz-Zdrój – Rymanów-Zdrój - Puławy – Tokarnia (778 m) – Kamień (717 m) – Komańcza - Cisna - Ustrzyki Górne - Wołosate.

== Motorsport ==
The mountains were used as a round in the 2014 International Hill Climb Cup.

== Literature ==
- Prof. Jadwiga Warszyńska. Karpaty Polskie : przyroda, człowiek i jego działalność; Uniwersytet Jagielloński. Kraków, 1995 ISBN 83-233-0852-7.
- Prof. Jerzy Kondracki. Geografia fizyczna Polski Warszawa : Państ. Wydaw. Naukowe, 1988, ISBN 83-01-02323-6.

== Bibliography ==
- Rosa Lehmann, "Social(ist) engineering. Taming the devils of the Polish Bieszczady," Communist and Post-Communist Studies, 42,3 (2009), 423–444.
