= Bystrá (Pelhřimov District) =

- Municipality
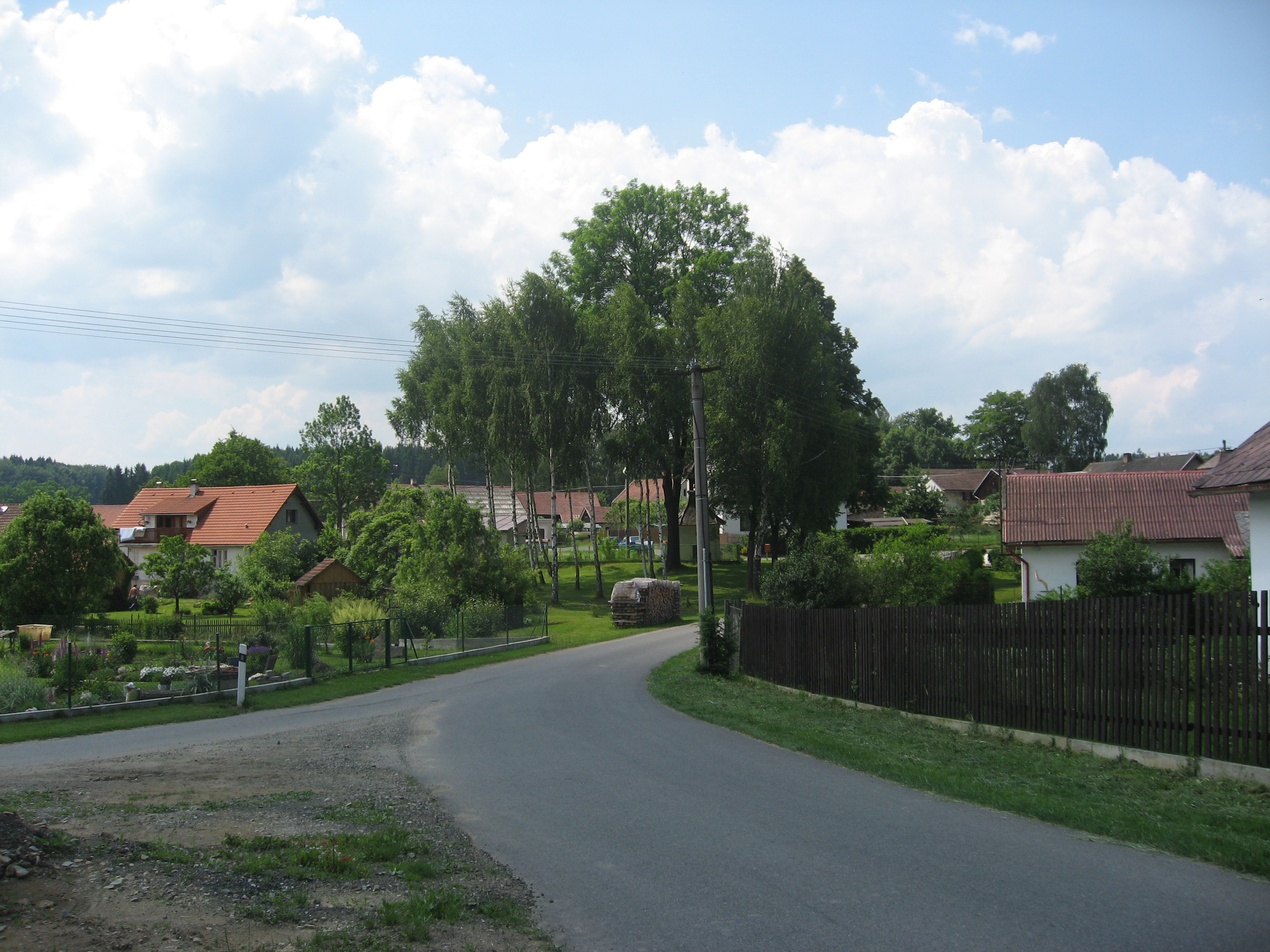
- Centre of Bystrá

- Location in the Czech Republic
- Coordinates: 49°30′31″N 15°22′16″E
- Country: Czech Republic
- Region: Vysočina
- District: Pelhřimov
- First mentioned: 1226

Area
  - Total: 3.93 km^{2} (1.52 sq mi)
- Elevation: 548 m (1,798 ft)

Population (2026-01-01)
  - Total: 141
  - Density: 35.9/km^{2} (92.9/sq mi)
- Time zone: UTC+1 (CET)
  - Summer (DST): UTC+2 (CEST)
- Postal code: 396 01
- Website: www.obecbystra.cz

Bystrá is a municipality and village in Pelhřimov District in the Vysočina Region of the Czech Republic. It has about 100 inhabitants.

Bystrá lies approximately 14 kilometres (9 mi) north-east of Pelhřimov, 20 km (12 mi) north-west of Jihlava, and 94 km (58 mi) south-east of Prague.

== Demographics ==
Historical population
Year	Pop.	±%
1869	264	—
1880	273	+3.4%
1890	258	−5.5%
1900	261	+1.2%
1910	277	+6.1%
1921	255	−7.9%
1930	251	−1.6%
1950	244	−2.8%
1961	243	−0.4%
1970	175	−28.0%
1980	126	−28.0%
1991	92	−27.0%
2001	88	−4.3%
2011	124	+40.9%
2021	121	−2.4%
Source: Censuses
