= Zahoczewie =

- Village
- Location within Poland
- Coordinates: 49°23′N 22°16′E
- Country: Poland
- Voivodeship: Subcarpathian
- County: Lesko
- Gmina: Baligród
- Population: 300

Zahoczewie [zaxɔˈt͡ʂɛvʲɛ] is a village in the administrative district of Gmina Baligród, within Lesko County, Subcarpathian Voivodeship, in south-eastern Poland.

== Location ==
Zahoczewie is in a small valley, on the road from Hoczew to Baligród.

== History ==
Zahoczewie was owned by the Bal family of Hoczew from 1427 onward, along with several other villages on the Hoczewka. It was first mentioned in 1435. By 1463, an Eastern Orthodox church was found there. After World War II, during Operation Vistula, the local Ukrainian population was forcibly deported. The church, rebuilt in 1934, was taken apart in 1949.

=== Historical demographics (1921) ===
As of 1921, 698 people lived in the 122 homes of Zahoczewie. Of the 698 inhabitants, 556 were Greek Catholics, 99 were Roman Catholics, and 43 were Jews.
