= Operation Harvest Festival =

1943 massacre of Jews during the Holocaust

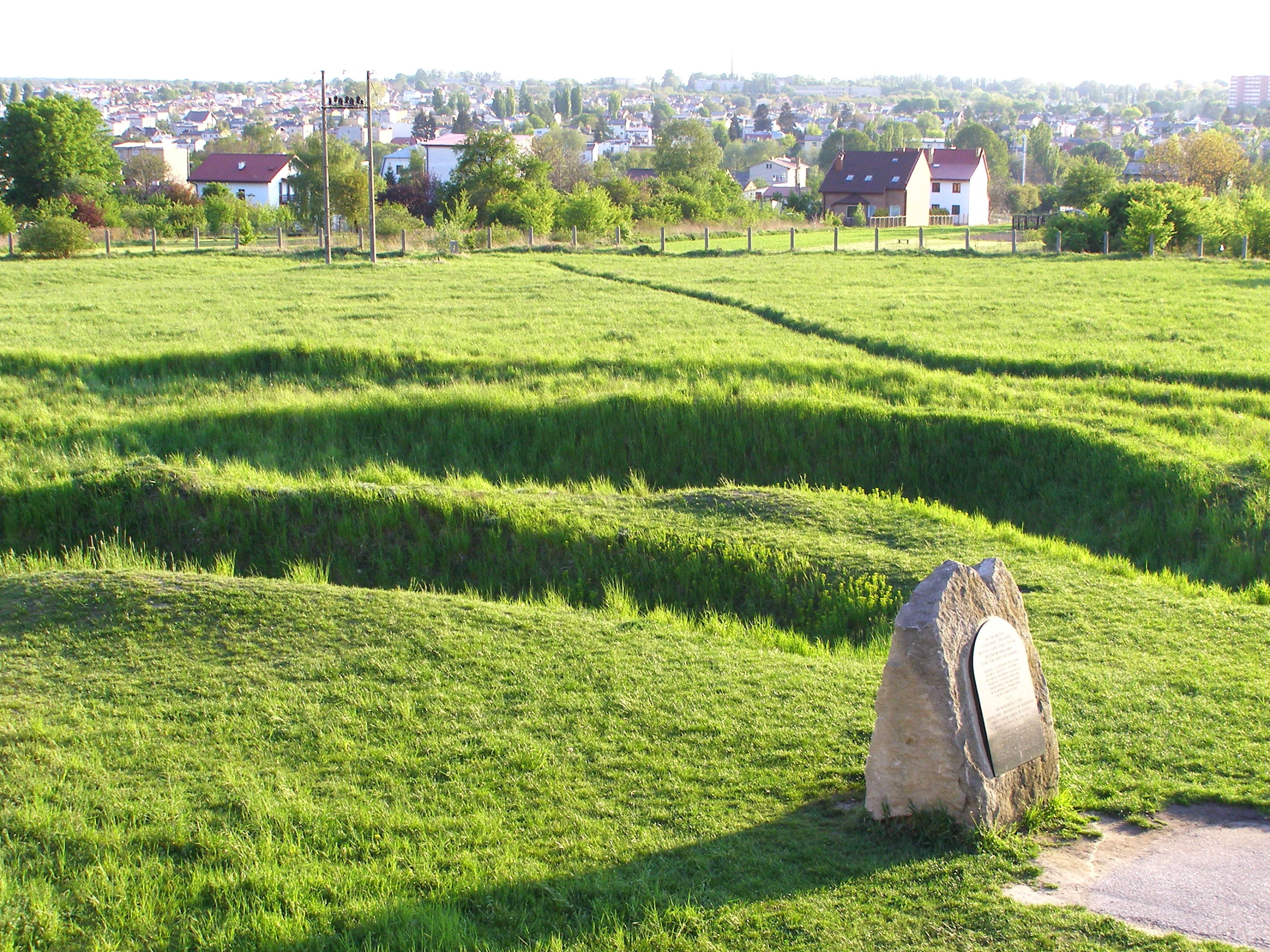
- Remains of the mass graves at Majdanek
- Location: Majdanek, Poniatowa and Trawniki concentration camps in the Lublin District of the General Governorate
- Date: 3–4 November 1943
- Target: Jews
- Attack type: Shooting
- Weapons: Rifles, automatic weapons
- Deaths: 39,000–43,000
- Perpetrators: SS, Order police, Trawniki men: Jakob Sporrenberg

Operation Harvest Festival (German: Aktion Erntefest) was the murder of up to 43,000 Jews at the Majdanek, Poniatowa and Trawniki concentration camps by the SS, the Order Police battalions, and the Ukrainian Sonderdienst on 3–4 November 1943.

After a series of Jewish uprisings in ghettos and extermination camps, Heinrich Himmler ordered the murder of the remaining Jewish forced laborers in the Lublin District of German-occupied Poland. In late October, Jewish laborers in the camps were ordered to dig zigzag trenches, supposedly for air defense. By 2 November, thousands of SS and police personnel had arrived in Lublin. That day, SS and Police Leader Jakob Sporrenberg held a conference to plan the operation.

The killings began at Majdanek, including the Lipowa 7 and Lublin airfield camps, which imprisoned Jews in the city. On the morning of 3 November, Jewish prisoners were separated from non-Jewish prisoners, and by early that evening, a total of 18,400 people had been shot. The same day, 6,000 people were murdered at Trawniki, including some from Dorohucza. After finishing the Majdanek operation, several of the involved military units proceeded to Poniatowa. On 4 November, they murdered that camp's 14,500 prisoners. In all three camps, Jews were forced to strip naked and to walk into the previously dug trenches, to be shot. Loud music covered the noise of the gunfire.

After the operation, about 10,000 Jews were left alive in various labor camps in the Lublin District. The bodies of the victims were burned by other Jews, who had been spared temporarily from death. With around 40,000 victims, Operation Harvest Festival was the largest single massacre of Jews by Axis forces during the Holocaust.

== Background ==
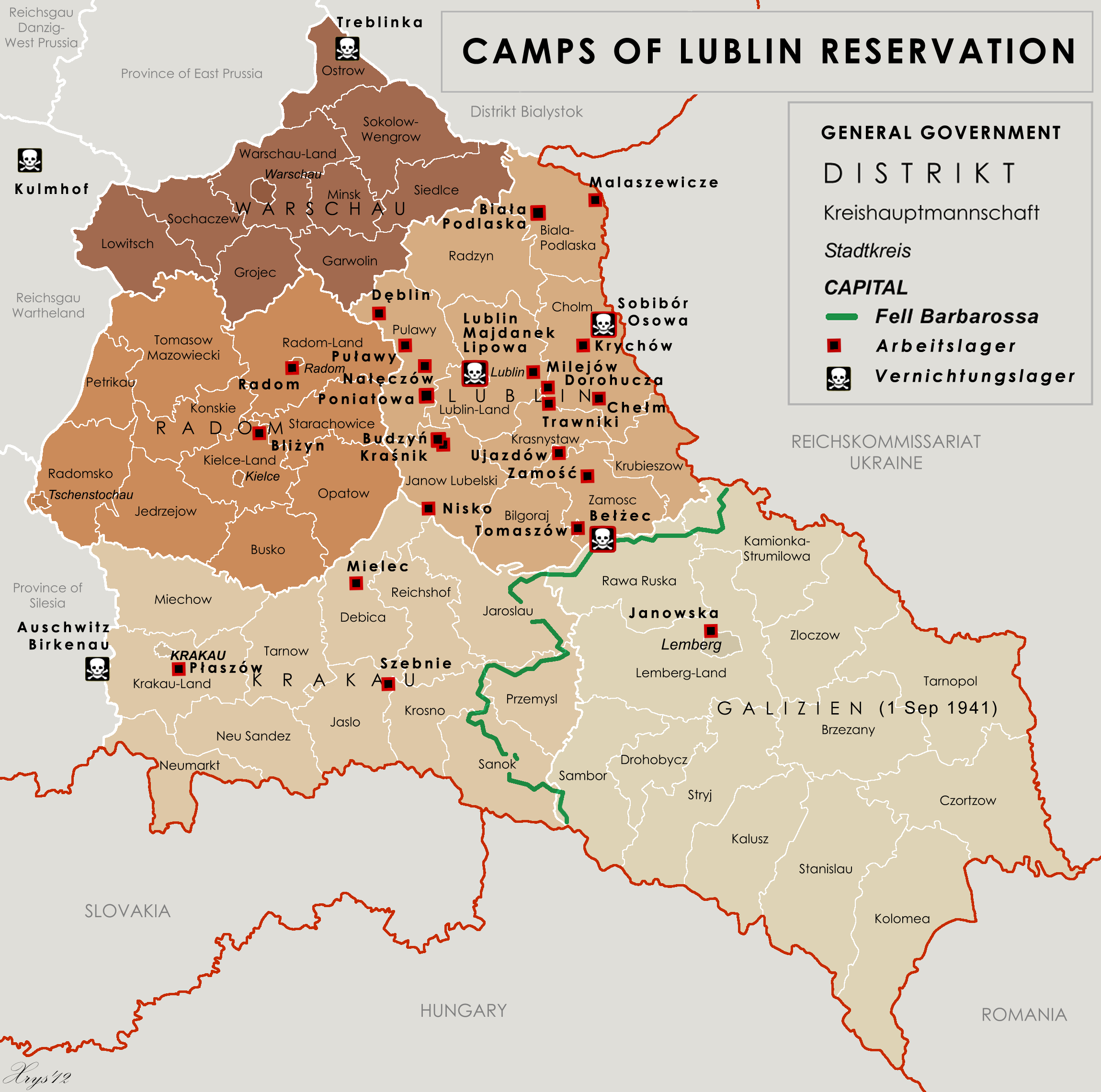
Forced-labor camps in the General Governorate; those affected by Operation Harvest Festival are in the upper right.

In 1942, 360,000 of the Jews who lived in the Lublin District of the General Governorate of German-occupied Poland were murdered during Operation Reinhard. By the end of the year, only 20,000 Jews were living in German camps and ghettos and no more than another 20,000 were in hiding. Beginning in January 1943, Jews launched a series of revolts in the General Governorate, including those at Warsaw Ghetto, Białystok Ghetto, and Treblinka extermination camp, while anti-Nazi partisan activity was increasing throughout the area. Although the proximate reason for ordering Harvest Festival is unknown, historians believe that it was in response to the uprising at Sobibór extermination camp on 14 October 1943. Thousands of the Jewish prisoners in the camps of the Lublin District had been transported there from the Warsaw Ghetto after the failure of the uprising there.

To avoid further resistance, Heinrich Himmler decided to exterminate the Jewish prisoners at the Lublin camps in a single decisive blow using overwhelming military force. Himmler ordered Friedrich Krüger, Higher SS and Police Leader in the General Governorate, to carry out the mass murder operation; Krüger delegated it to SS and Police Leader Jakob Sporrenberg, who had recently succeeded Odilo Globocnik. Jewish inmates were ordered to dig zigzag trenches along the perimeter of Majdanek, Poniatowa, and Trawniki concentration camps. At Majdanek, the trenches were dug by a team of 300 prisoners working in three shifts in field 5, south of the crematorium, and measured about 100 metres (330 ft) long, 2–3 metres (7–10 ft) deep and 1.5–3 metres (5–10 ft) wide. Although the trenches were supposedly for defense against air raids, and their zigzag shape granted some plausibility to this lie, the prisoners guessed their true purpose.

On 2 November, 2,000 to 3,000 SS and police personnel arrived in Lublin: Waffen-SS from as far away as Kraków, Police Regiment 22, Police Regiment 25 (including Reserve Police Battalion 101), and the Lublin Security Police. That evening, Sporrenberg convened a meeting between his own staff, the commandants of Majdanek, Trawniki, and Poniatowa, local Security Police commander Karl Pütz, and the commanders of the various units. The murder operation, due to begin at dawn the next day, was planned as a military operation, with the code name Erntefest ("Harvest Festival"). Two loudspeakers, installed on police cars, were positioned at Majdanek, one near the trenches and the other by the entrance of the camp. The leadership of the Lipowa 7 camp in Lublin, which held Jewish prisoners of war, queried Himmler as to whether they should violate the Geneva Convention by allowing the prisoners to be executed. Himmler's aide, Werner Grothmann, replied that "all Jews without exception are subject to liquidation".

== Killings ==
=== Majdanek ===
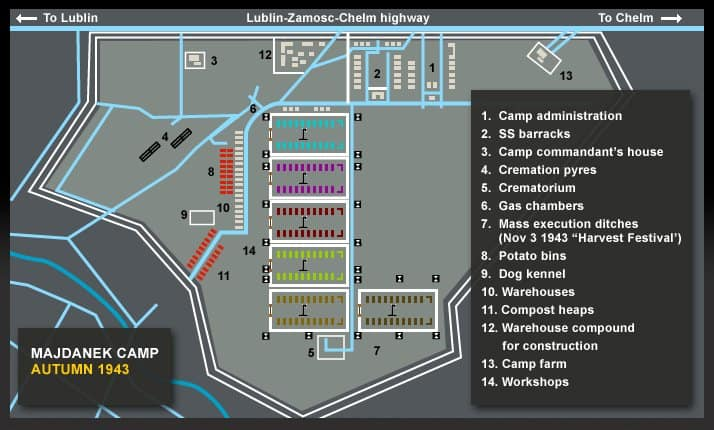
Camp 5 is the rectangle to the lower left in this map of Majdanek.

At 5:00 on 3 November 1943, prisoners at Majdanek were awoken as usual in the dark, but the camp had been surrounded by an additional 500 soldiers during the night. The 3,500 to 4,000 Jewish prisoners lived among non-Jewish prisoners. After morning roll call, the groups were separated, with Jews ordered to go to camp 5. Jews in the infirmary were trucked to that location, while the non-Jewish prisoners at camp 5 were moved to camp 4. The barbed wire fence was repositioned to include the execution area within the cordon. Prisoners were forced to undress and driven in groups of one hundred to the three trenches in the field beyond the camp. At the beginning of a ramp leading to the trenches, the Jews were separated into groups of ten and forced onward to the trenches. Execution squads of 10–12 men each from police battalions and 5th SS Panzer Division Wiking were waiting, and were replaced every few hours. The prisoners were forced to lie down in the trenches and were shot in the nape of the neck.

About 600 prisoners, half men and half women, were selected at the Lublin airfield camp to clean up after the massacre at Majdanek. The rest, approximately 5,000 or 6,000, along with 2,500 Jewish prisoners of war at Lipowa 7, were marched toward Majdanek. Despite being heavily guarded, the Jewish prisoners of war rushed their guards and tried to escape, reportedly shouting "Niech żyje wolność!" (Long live freedom!) Almost all were shot before they could get away. The first prisoners from the other camps arrived at Majdanek around 7:30 and continued to arrive throughout the morning. Among the Jews from Majdanek, some tried to escape their fate through suicide or by hiding in the barracks. The next day, twenty-three Jews were discovered and were executed at the Majdanek crematorium. The speakers, which had been installed the previous day, were turned on as soon as the gunfire started, but it could still be heard. Local Poles watched from the rooftops of nearby buildings outside the camp, while Sporrenberg observed from a Fieseler Storch airplane. It is not clear who directed the operation as it was ongoing; it may have been Sporrenberg or Hermann Höfle. The killing continued, uninterrupted until around 17:00 and by then all 18,400 prisoners had been murdered.

=== Trawniki ===
Previous to the operation, Polish residents who lived adjacent to the camp were forced to move and those who lived a bit farther away were forced to stay in their homes. Jewish prisoners who lived in the settlement outside the camp proper were returned to the camp. At 5:00 on 3 November, the prisoners were mustered for roll call, rounded up, and marched to the Hiwi training camp, where loudspeakers were playing music beside the trenches. The victims were ordered to disrobe and place their clothing in piles, then to lie face down on top of those already shot, and the executioner would dispatch them by a shot to the nape of the neck. Men were shot before women and children. The shooting was already well underway when prisoners from Dorohucza arrived by rail at 7:00. After the trenches were filled, some Jews were executed at a sand pit in the labor camp. The execution of 6,000 Jews occurred continuously until 15:00 (or 17:00), with only a few managing to hide and survive.

=== Poniatowa ===
Many of the SS and police soldiers who had been at Majdanek continued to Poniatowa, about 50 kilometres (30 mi) distant, after the massacre had finished. The units participating in the massacre at Poniatowa included Reserve Police Battalion 101, Motorized Gendarmerie Battalion 1, Police Battalion 41, and Police Battalion 67. There were 14,800 Jews at the camp before the massacre, most of them having come from the Warsaw Ghetto. On 3 November, the Jews were sent back to their barracks after roll call. The camp was sealed and telephone lines were cut, so that the prisoners would not know what fate awaited them. Some thought that there was going to be a selection, and tried to make themselves look healthier. That evening, the camp was surrounded by 1,000–1,500 German and Ukrainian soldiers, who formed three concentric security cordons around the camp by morning.

The next morning (4 November), at 4:30, the prisoners were awoken for roll call. Most were held in Hall 3, except 200 prisoners who were temporarily spared at the insistence of commandant Gottlieb Hering, to clean up after the massacre. They were locked in the camp kitchen. Policemen searched the barracks and factory for anyone who was hiding, and then stood guard on both sides of the Lagerstrasse (main avenue) in the camp. Prisoners were ordered to strip naked, hand over all valuables, and walk down the Lagerstrasse in groups of 50, starting with the men. As loud music blared, the prisoners were herded to the two trenches by the entrance of the camp, 95 metres (310 ft) long, 2 metres (7 ft) wide, and 1.5 metres (5 ft) deep. One soldier stood at the beginning of the trench with a whip to encourage the Jews to immediately lie down on top of the bodies of those who had already been shot. Two shooters stood on each of the long sides of the trench, shooting alternately at the victims, each equipped with a bottle of schnapps and an assistant to reload their weapons. According to a witness, many of the victims were not killed and lay wounded in the trench as more bodies piled on top of them, cursing the SS.

Around 14:00, the executions were halted for a lunch break and the drunk executioners were relieved. The trenches turned out to be too shallow and bloody corpses spilled out of the edges. Some prisoners in Poniatowa had formed a resistance group and had acquired a few weapons. At 18:00, a group of around 100 Jews set fire to some barracks full of clothing and then barricaded themselves in another barracks. The Germans set this on fire, killing all of the resistance members. Polish fire fighters were brought in to put out the fires and observed the Germans throwing wounded Jews into the flames. The executions finished around 17:00. Afterward, German soldiers checked the trenches, executing survivors. The corpses were sprinkled with lime and covered with fir branches. Three women survived, climbed out of the mass grave that night, and survived the war with the help of Żegota. Overall, 14,500 people were killed within the span of a few hours.

== Coverup ==
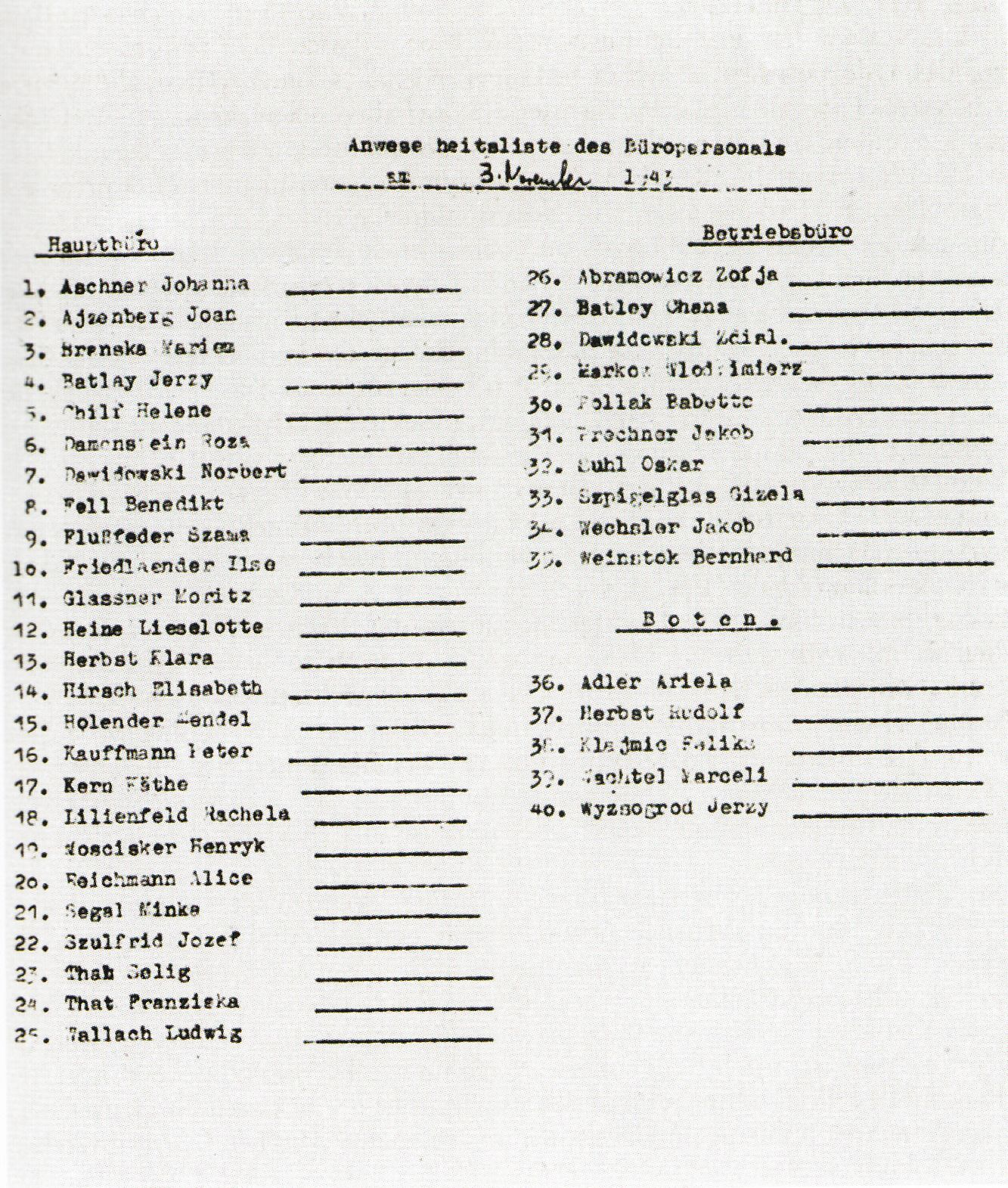
List of Jewish prisoners working at the camp office at Trawniki. All were murdered on 3 November.

Removing all traces of the killing was a priority of the Nazi leadership because of Soviet military victories on the Eastern Front. After the German defeat at Stalingrad, Soviet forces recaptured most of Ukraine, Russia, and eastern Belarus by the end of 1943. At Majdanek, the cleanup took two months and was done under the supervision of Erich Muhsfeldt, previously an executioner at Auschwitz. The 600 men and women from the airfield camp had to sort the clothing of the Jews murdered at Majdanek. Then, the women were deported to Auschwitz and killed in the gas chambers. The men had to cremate the bodies, and they were either killed or recruited into Sonderkommando 1005. Witnesses recalled that for months, the stench of burning flesh hung around the vicinity. The ditches were filled with soil and leveled.

The Jews at Milejowo concentration camp were sent to Trawniki on 5 November to clean up the massacre. Six women had to work in the kitchen while the men were ordered to extract gold teeth and hidden valuables from the corpses. After eight days (or two to three weeks), the men were executed, except for Yehezkel Hering, who disguised himself as a woman and hid with them. The women remained at the camp and sorted the belongings of the murdered Jews until May 1944, when they were deported via Majdanek to Auschwitz and other concentration camps.

About 50 Jews hid from the shootings at Poniatowa, and 150 were left alive after the shooting to clean up and cremate the corpses. Upon refusing to do so, they were shot on 6 November. Therefore, the Ukrainians were ordered to do so, but they were very reluctant and drank heavily. Many deserted and after a week, the remaining Ukrainians refused to do any more. According to Israeli historian David Silberklang, 120 Jews were brought in from Majdanek to do the work. Other reports have 60 to 80 prisoners of Sonderkommando 1005, who took six weeks to accomplish the task under the guard of Police Battalion 316 from Kraśnik. The bodies were dragged from the trenches by teams of horses, and incinerated on grates with wood and gasoline. Six or eight Jews escaped one night, but many of them were later caught and executed. As this was ongoing, the decomposition process of the corpses was so terrible in smell it reportedly caused hardened SS men to vomit. Afterward, the Jewish prisoners were executed by men from Police Battalion 101 in Puławy.

== Aftermath and significance ==
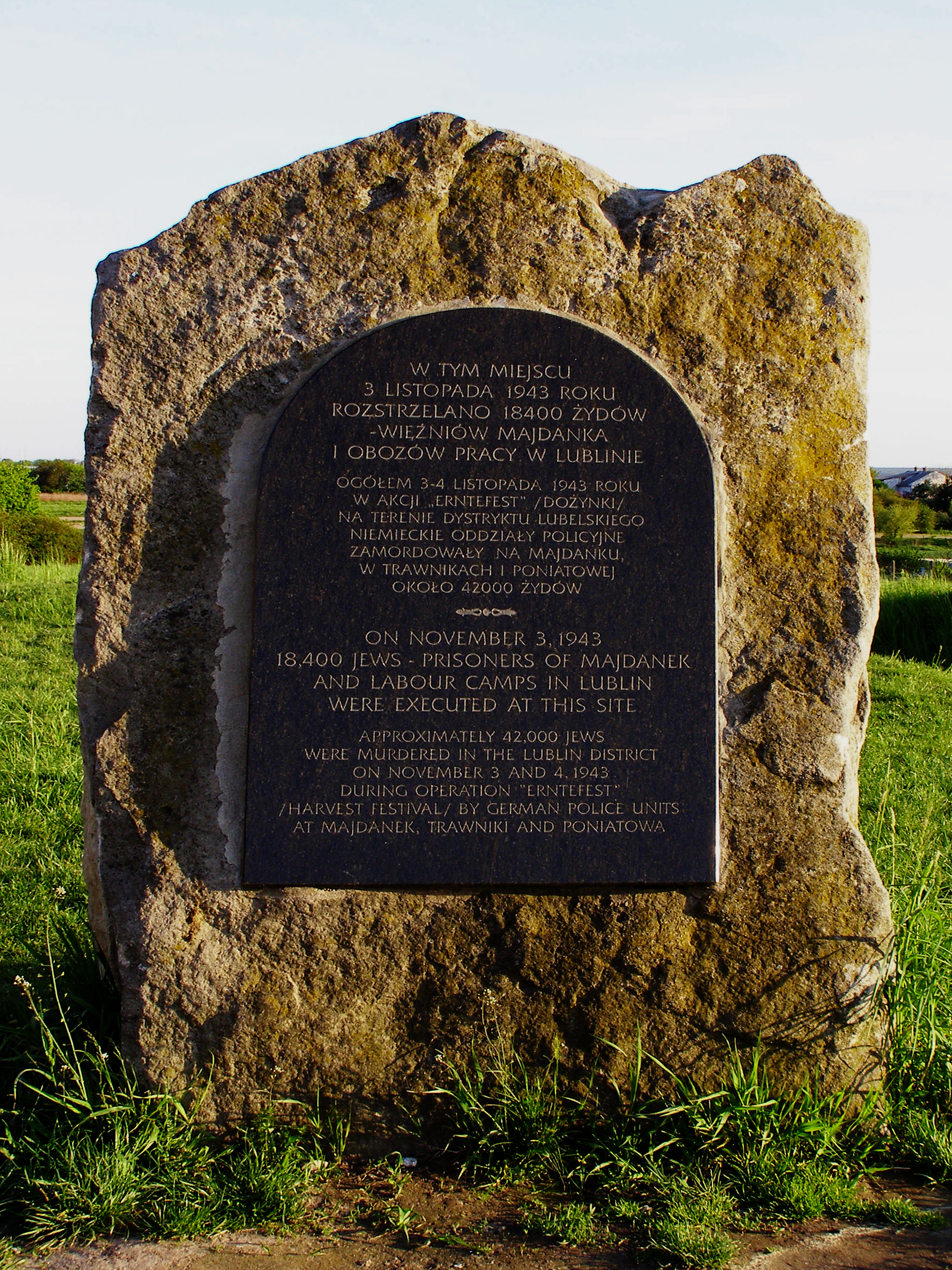
Memorial plaque at Majdanek

The day 3 November was dubbed "Bloody Wednesday" by Majdanek prisoners. Following the operation, ten labor camps for Jews in the Lublin District (including Dęblin–Irena and Budzyń) had about 10,000 Jews still alive. The Jews at Budzyń were not executed, despite the camp's status as a subcamp of Majdanek. According to survivors, a few Jews were taken from Budzyń to Majdanek, returning with bloody clothing and tales of the massacre. Israeli historian David Silberklang attributes the survival of the camp to the desire of local German functionaries to continue benefiting financially from slave labor and avoid a transfer to the front, but states it is unclear why the camp escaped Himmler's notice.

The Harvest Festival operation coincided with other massacres of surviving Jews in Kraków District and Galicia District, including the Wehrmacht camps in Galicia, but spared the forced-labor camps in Radom District which had not been placed under SS command. In the Lublin District, Jews were killed separately at Annopol-Rachów, Puławy, and other smaller sites. The SS enterprise Ostindustrie, which employed many of the murdered prisoners, was not informed in advance; the company was liquidated later in the month. The operation marked the end of Operation Reinhard.

According to Christopher Browning, the minimum estimate of the death toll was 30,500 at Majdanek and Poniatowa, and murder estimates at Trawniki start at 6,000, but may be 8,000 to 10,000. Overall, the operation is variously estimated to have killed 39,000 to 43,000, at least 40,000, 42,000, or 42,000 to 43,000 victims. Measured by death count, Harvest Festival was the single largest massacre of Jews by German forces during the Holocaust. It surpassed the killing of more than 33,000 Jews at Babi Yar outside Kiev and was exceeded only by the 1941 Odessa massacre of more than 50,000 Jews in October 1941, committed by Romanian troops.

After the war, Sporrenberg was tried, convicted, and executed by a Polish court for his role in organizing the operation, while Pütz committed suicide. In 1999, Alfons Gotzfrid was sentenced to time served for his participation in the killings at Majdanek. The Majdanek State Museum has hosted ceremonies to commemorate the victims.
