= Lublin airfield camp =

Coordinates: 51°14′06″N 22°34′54″E

A map of the Holocaust in Poland

The Lublin airfield camp was a Nazi forced labor concentration camp, primarily for Jews, at the airfield in Lublin, Poland during 1942–1943, with its prehistory starting from 1939. It also employed and detained (non-Jewish) Polish women. It is also referred to as "(Lublin) airstrip camp", "Flugplatz labor camp", "Alter Flugplatz lager" (Old Airfield camp), etc.

The airfield was located in the area of the Lublin Aircraft Factory (based on the nationalized E. Plage and T. Laśkiewicz Mechanical Works).

The major industrial operation of the camp and its precursors on the factory grounds was storage, sorting and retailoring of goods looted from the Jews put into Nazi camps, as well as fur goods confiscated during the so-called "Fur Action". Part of the inmates was also involved in construction works on the site and around. In November 1943 the Jewish inmates were exterminated.

== Operation ==
=== Preliminaries ===
The Lublin Aircraft Factory was heavily damaged in air raids during the German invasion of Poland, and manufacturing facilities were converted by the Germans into the warehouses and a minor POW camp. During 1940-1942 it was utilized as horse stables, the Waffen SS Clothing Storehouses as well as the Wehrmacht technical service unit.

By July 1940 a temporary labor camp for the rounded-up Jews was created on the premises for dismantling works, which was disbanded upon the completion of the works.

During 1941-1942 the SS Garment Factory operated on the premises, which employed Jewish tailors and furriers. A part of the activities of the garment factory was sorting and recycling of fur goods confiscated during the so-called Pelzaktion ("Fur Action") The factory was replaced with the storehouse which sorted goods looted from the Jews during the Operation Reinhard.

Since Winter 1942 a permanent forced labor camp was organized for Polish and Jewish females. Since 1943 it confined only Jewish females.

=== Actual airfield camp ===
In 1942 the construction of the actual Lublin airfield camp was commenced, and in September it was ready to confine some 1,200 construction workers. Later it was decided to relocate the female camp to the newly constructed airfield camp as well.

During Operation Reinhard the camp was used as sorting grounds to separate skilled laborers from the arriving transports of the Jews.

In Fall 1943 all nearby Ostarbeiter labor camps were formally resubordinated from Ostindustrie to Majdanek camp system. In the case of the Flugplatz camp this was never implemented because in November 1943 the Operation Harvest Festival to murder Jewish forced laborers in Lublin District was carried out. The Jewish inmates of the camp were marched out to Majdanek and nearly all were killed there. The camp was liquidated at the same time.

== Aftermath ==
In November 2017 a memorial plaque was installed on the site, with the following text:

During the German occupation a labour camp for Jews and, initially, small groups of Poles, was located in the area of the former factory airfield. Between 1942 and 1943, as part of the Third Reich’s plans to exterminate the Jews (“Aktion Reinhardt”), the site was the central sorting facility for property of the victims murdered in Nazi death camps in Bełżec, Sobibór and Treblinka. On November 3, 1943, the Jewish prisoners of Flugplatz were shot at the concentration camp at Majdanek.

== See also ==
- Lipowa 7 camp
