= Arbeitsamt in occupied Poland =

Employment offices established by the Nazi German authorities in Poland

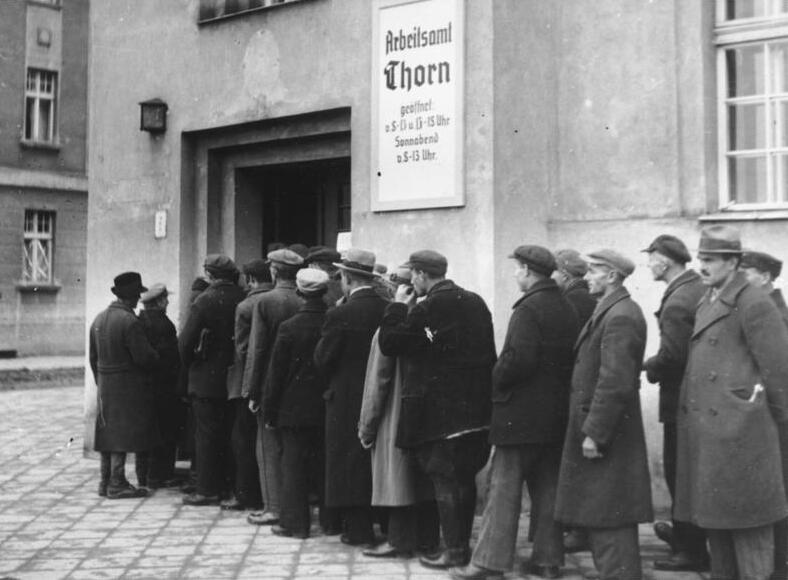
Poles in front of the Arbeitsamt office in occupied Toruń, October 1939

Arbeitsamt in occupied Poland were employment offices that were established by the Nazi German authorities in the occupied Polish territories during World War II.

Public employment agency were bodies of civil administration. Their primary task was to register the Polish labor force and shape employment policy in a way that would allow for its maximum exploitation for the benefit of the Third Reich. Arbeitsamt played a crucial role during the deportation of Poles for forced labor in Germany. As a result, their activities faced both passive resistance from the population and armed opposition from the Polish resistance movement.

== Origin ==
In Nazi Germany, until 1942, the Ministry of Labour of the Reich (Reichsarbeitsministerium) was responsible for all matters related to employment policy. Starting in 1938, state employment offices (Arbeitsamt) were subordinated to the ministry, which granted them a monopoly on employment mediation. That same year, the freedom of German workers to change their place of employment was restricted, and a system of official work assignment was introduced. After the outbreak of World War II, terminating an employment relationship in Germany became possible only with the approval of the Arbeitsamt. In 1942, Arbeitsamt, along with the entire executive apparatus of the Reichsarbeitsministerium, were subordinated to the General Plenipotentiary for Employment (Generalbevollmächtigte für den Arbeitseinsatz), Fritz Sauckel.

On 1 September 1939, Germany launched an armed aggression against Poland. From the first days of the war, the Nazi authorities undertook actions aimed at maximizing the exploitation of the Polish workforce. Forced labor was primarily imposed on the population residing in territories annexed to the Reich. This was enforced based on various local regulations and applied to individuals aged 14 to 65, and sometimes even to those up to 70 years old. Shortly thereafter, by decree of Hans Frank on 26 October 1939, the obligation to work for Poles and forced labor for Jews was introduced in the territory of the General Government. Initially, this affected individuals aged 18 to 60, and later also youth from the age of 14.

The main instrument for implementing employment policy became Arbeitsamt. The task of organizing them in the occupied Polish territories was assigned to the Provincial Employment Offices (Landesarbeitsamt), which functioned at the provincial level in the Third Reich. Even before the outbreak of the war, relevant guidelines were sent to the provincial offices in Brandenburg, East Prussia, Pomerania, and Silesia. The latter (Landesarbeitsamt Schlesien based in Wrocław) was tasked with organizing Arbeitsamt in central Poland, which later became part of the General Government.

== Establishment of Arbeitsamt in occupied Polish territories ==
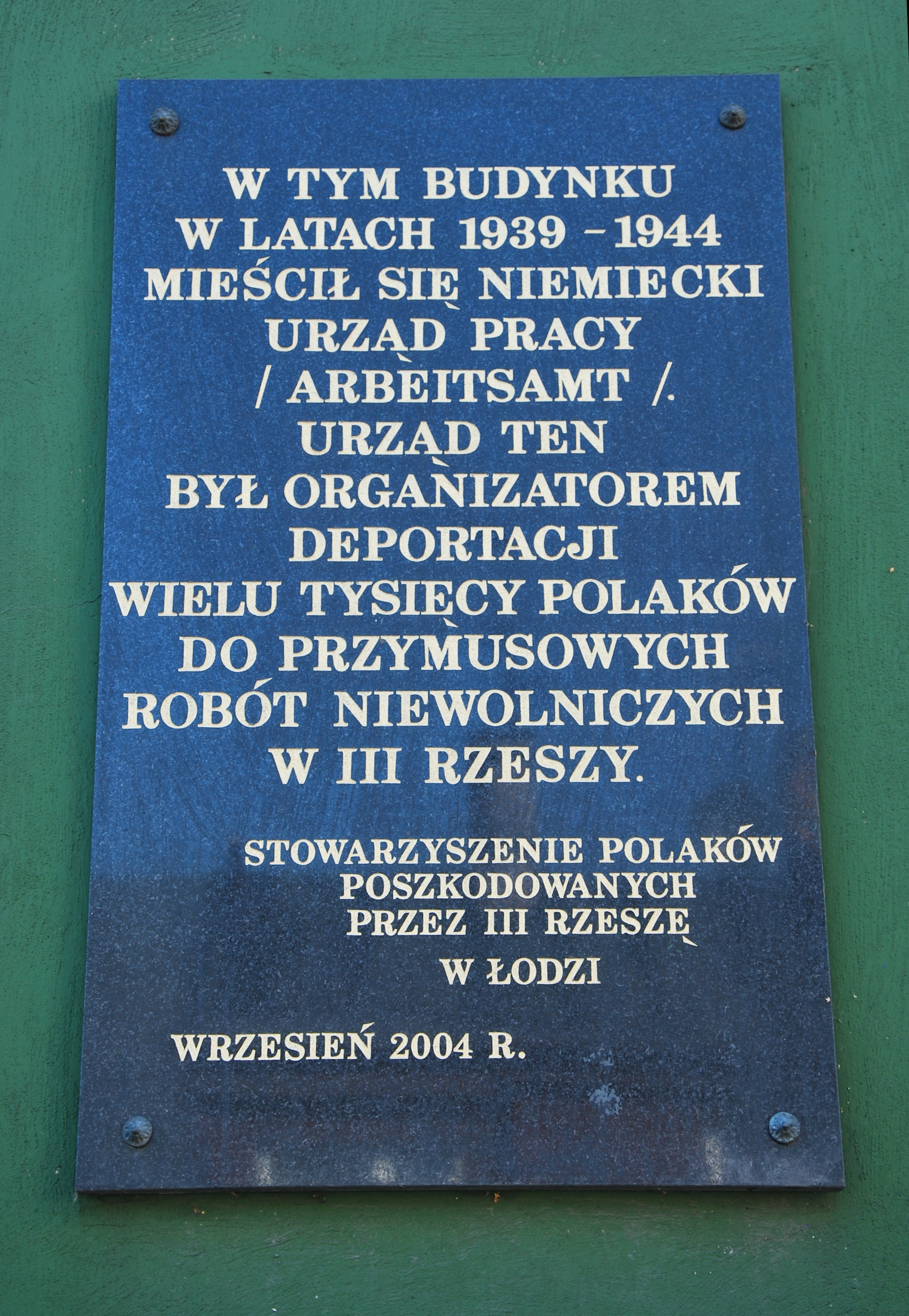
Commemorative plaque in Zgierz honoring the activities of the Arbeitsamt in the city

The process of establishing Arbeitsamt in occupied Polish territories began even before the conclusion of the September campaign. In designated cities, immediately after their occupation by the Wehrmacht, the Provincial Employment Offices set up their branches, which were gradually transformed into full-fledged employment offices. The significance of labor administration is evidenced by the fact that it operated separately from the existing general economic administration within the occupation apparatus.

The first Arbeitsamt was established on 3 September 1939 in Rybnik. By mid-September, 30 Arbeitsamt were already functioning in occupied Polish territories, and by the end of that month, their number had risen to 70. Among them, 15 offices and 17 branches were established in Greater Poland. In Upper Silesia, which was later incorporated into the Katowice region, 13 offices and 15 branches were operational by mid-September. By 8 September, Arbeitsamt had been opened in Lubliniec and Tarnowskie Góry. Between 8 and 21 September, employment offices were organized in Częstochowa, Piotrków Trybunalski, Radomsko, Kielce, Sandomierz, Radom, Kraków, Nowy Sącz, and Tarnów. In October of that year, the Germans began establishing Arbeitsamt in the future districts of Lublin and Warsaw.

The Arbeitsamt were among the first organs of the German civil administration to start functioning in the occupied Polish territories. Initially, they operated independently of one another and separately from the labor administration in the "Old Reich", cooperating only with local Wehrmacht command authorities.

In the second half of October 1939, after the final establishment of the German civil administration structures in the occupied Polish territories, the Arbeitsamt became part of the occupation labor administration. In the administrative units created in the territories annexed to the Reich, the Provincial Employment Offices were responsible for all matters related to labor administration (from 1 August 1943, they became District Employment Offices). They supervised the Main Employment Offices (Hauptstelle), located in the capitals of individual regions, and their branches (Nebenstelle), which were established in district towns. The heads of the Provincial Employment Offices also served as representatives of the Reich Trustee for Labor.

The labor administration in the General Government had a much more centralized structure. Its highest authority was the Main Labor Department in the Government of the General Government. This department oversaw the labor departments in the offices of the heads of individual districts (Abteilung Arbeit), which functioned similarly to the Provincial Employment Offices in the "Old Reich". Directly subordinate to these departments were the Arbeitsamt and their branches.

== Arbeitsamt in the General Government ==
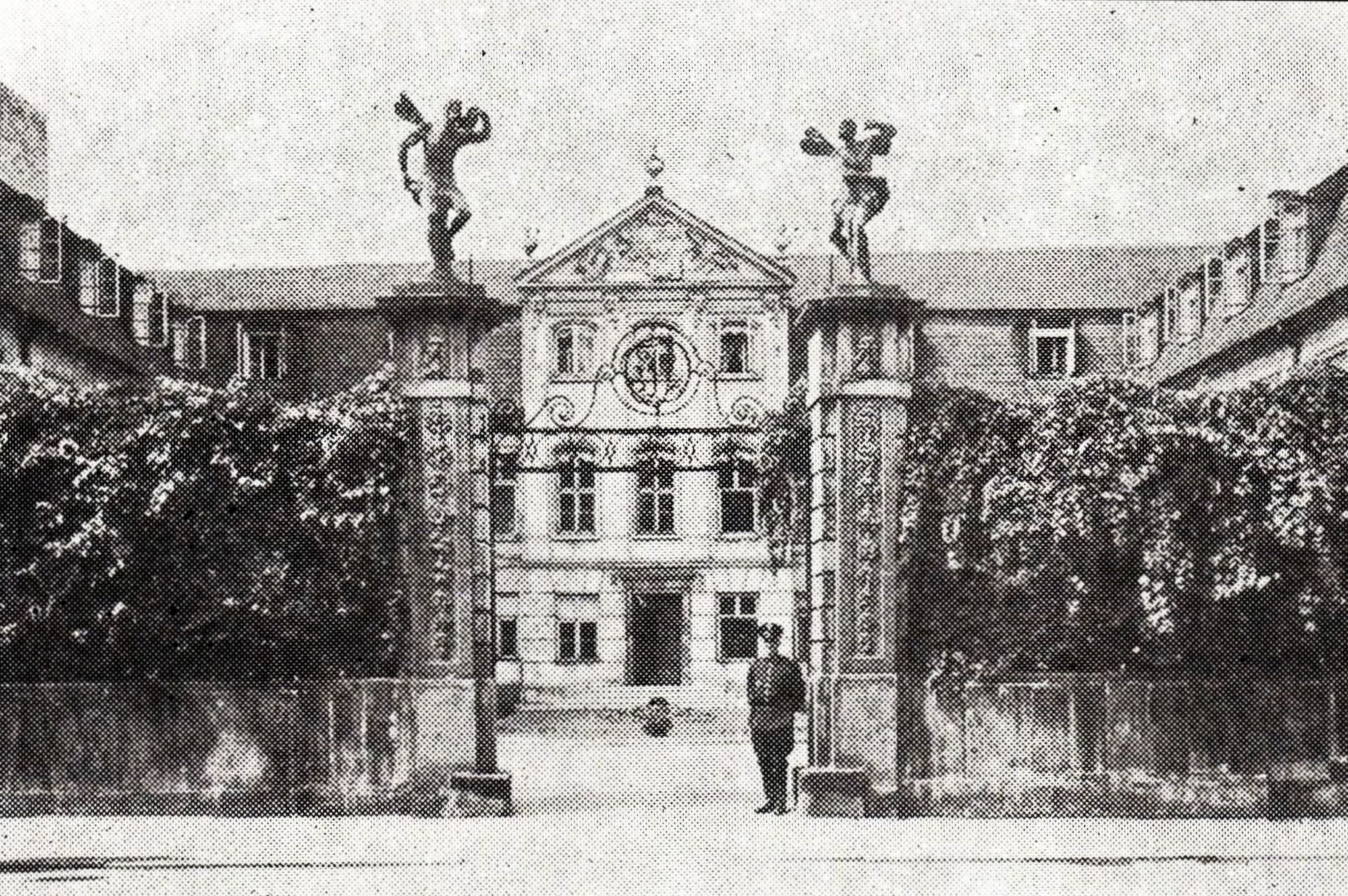
Palace of the Four Winds in Warsaw, which housed the Arbeitsamt headquarters during the occupation

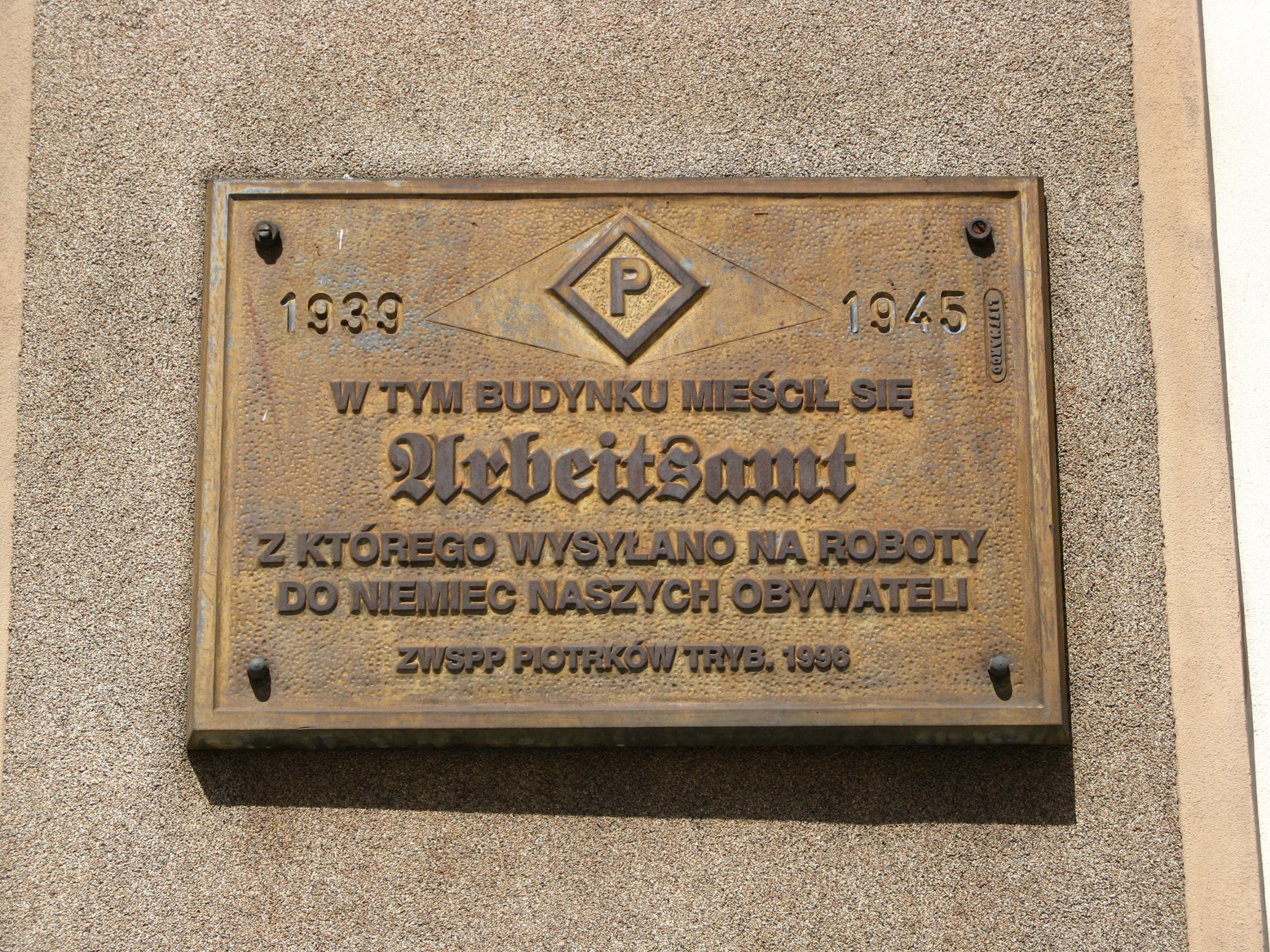
Commemorative plaque in Piotrków Trybunalski honoring the activities of the Arbeitsamt in the city

In the General Government, Arbeitsamt were organized in cities with county seat status. Their territorial jurisdiction covered at least two counties. The jurisdiction of their branches (Aussenstelle, Nebenstelle) encompassed one county, while auxiliary offices (Hilfsstelle) covered several municipalities. Moreover, when necessary – typically during large recruitment campaigns – temporary support points (Stützpunkte) were established in the most remote localities.

Maria Wardzyńska provides the following structure of employment offices in the General Government:

- Warsaw District
  - Arbeitsamt in Warsaw (Note: The Arbeitsamt in Warsaw covered the urban and rural Warsaw districts (Warschau and Landkreis Warschau). At its peak, it had 20 branches throughout the city, including one for the Warsaw Ghetto (Komorowski (2014, p. 19)).)
  - Arbeitsamt in Mińsk Mazowiecki
  - Arbeitsamt in Siedlce
  - Arbeitsamt in Skierniewice
  - Arbeitsamt in Sochaczew
- Kraków District
  - Arbeitsamt in Kraków, with branches in Bochnia, Krzeszowice, Miechów, Skawina, Wieliczka, and Wolbrom
  - Arbeitsamt in Tarnów, with branches in Brzesko, Dębica, Mielec, and Tarnobrzeg
  - Arbeitsamt in Rzeszów, with branches in Jarosław, Nisko, and Przemyśl
  - Arbeitsamt in Jasło, with branches in Gorlice, Krosno, Sanok, and Nowy Żmigród
  - Arbeitsamt in Nowy Sącz, with branches in Krynica, Nowy Targ, and Zakopane
- Lublin District
  - Arbeitsamt in Lublin, with branches in Kraśnik, Lubartów, and Puławy
  - Arbeitsamt in Biała Podlaska, with a branch in Terespol
  - Arbeitsamt in Chełm, with branches in Hrubieszów and Krasnystaw
  - Arbeitsamt in Łuków, with auxiliary offices in Międzyrzec, Stoczek Łukowski, and Żelechów
  - Arbeitsamt in Zamość, with a branch in Tomaszów Lubelski
- Radom District
  - Arbeitsamt in Częstochowa
  - Arbeitsamt in Kielce
  - Arbeitsamt in Końskie
  - Arbeitsamt in Ostrowiec Świętokrzyski
  - Arbeitsamt in Piotrków Trybunalski
  - Arbeitsamt in Radom
  - Arbeitsamt in Radomsko
  - Arbeitsamt in Sandomierz
- Galicia District (from 1941)
  - Arbeitsamt in Lviv, with branches in Kamianka-Buzka, Rava-Ruska, and Sudova Vyshnia
  - Arbeitsamt in Drohobych, with branches in Boryslav, Sambir, and Stryi
  - Arbeitsamt in Stanyslaviv, with branches in Kalush, Kolomyia, and Rohatyn
  - Arbeitsamt in Ternopil, with branches in Chortkiv, Berezhany, and Zolochiv

This structure was not constant. In February 1941, the General Government had 28 Arbeitsamt, 79 branches, and over 200 Stützpunkte. By March 1943, the number of employment offices had decreased to 21, while the number of branches and Stützpunkte had risen to 82 and 300, respectively.

== Internal organizational structure ==
The internal organizational structure of the Arbeitsamt was as follows:

- Administrative department – responsible for the internal organizational matters of the office, including its budget, accounting, and the management of statistics.
- Employment department (Arbeitseinsatzabteilung) – the key department responsible for planning activities related to employment policy, issuing directives, and carrying out "direct actions" in the field. It was also responsible for issuing work cards and overseeing transit camps.
- Relief department.
- Department for labor protection, labor law, wage regulation, and social security.

In the General Government, only German officials from the Third Reich (Reichsdeutsche) could serve as heads of Arbeitsamt and their branches. Local Volksdeutsche were also employed in labor offices, although the highest position they could attain was head of an auxiliary office. Poles were sometimes employed in the lowest positions.

== Tasks and competencies ==
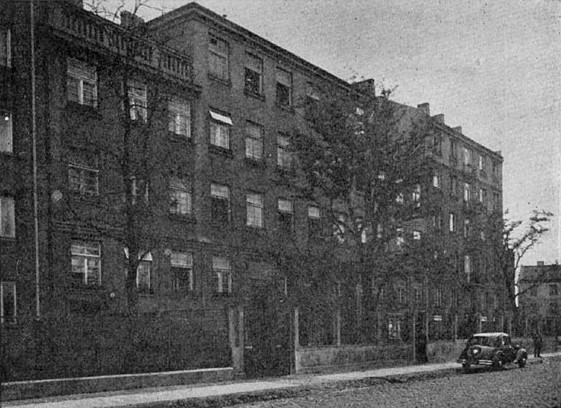
A transit camp on 9 Skaryszewska Street in Warsaw, from which Poles were deported to work in the Reich. Such camps were under the authority of the Arbeitsamt

As Wacław Jastrzębowski states:

The main goal of the occupation's labor administration was to register the country's entire labor force, regulate working conditions and job placement, and, based on this, organize the supply of Polish workers for forced labor in the Reich.

Already in the autumn of 1939, the Arbeitsamt in the occupied Polish territories carried out a registration of the unemployed. This allowed them to record the Polish labor force. Those who registered – lured by the prospect of receiving benefits or job offers – were the first to be sent for forced labor, including deportations to the Third Reich. If someone registered as unemployed due to illness, disability, or temporary closure of their workplace, the Arbeitsamt could assign them to unpaid odd jobs (up to 48 hours per week).

In the occupied Polish territories, freedom of employment contracts and choice of workplace was abolished. Changing an employer became dependent on the Arbeitsamt's permission. Likewise, employers could not hire or fire workers without the Arbeitsamt’s consent, regardless of the type of employment or contract. The offices also had the authority to interfere in employer-employee relations (especially in areas like wages, leave, and benefits) – primarily to prevent local employment from becoming more attractive than being sent to work in Germany.

The Arbeitsamt had exclusive competence in directing Poles to work. Among other things, they were authorized to terminate employment contracts and assign a new workplace to an individual (or sometimes even an entire workforce of particular company). Without their approval, an apprentice could not begin learning a trade in a craft or industrial workshop.

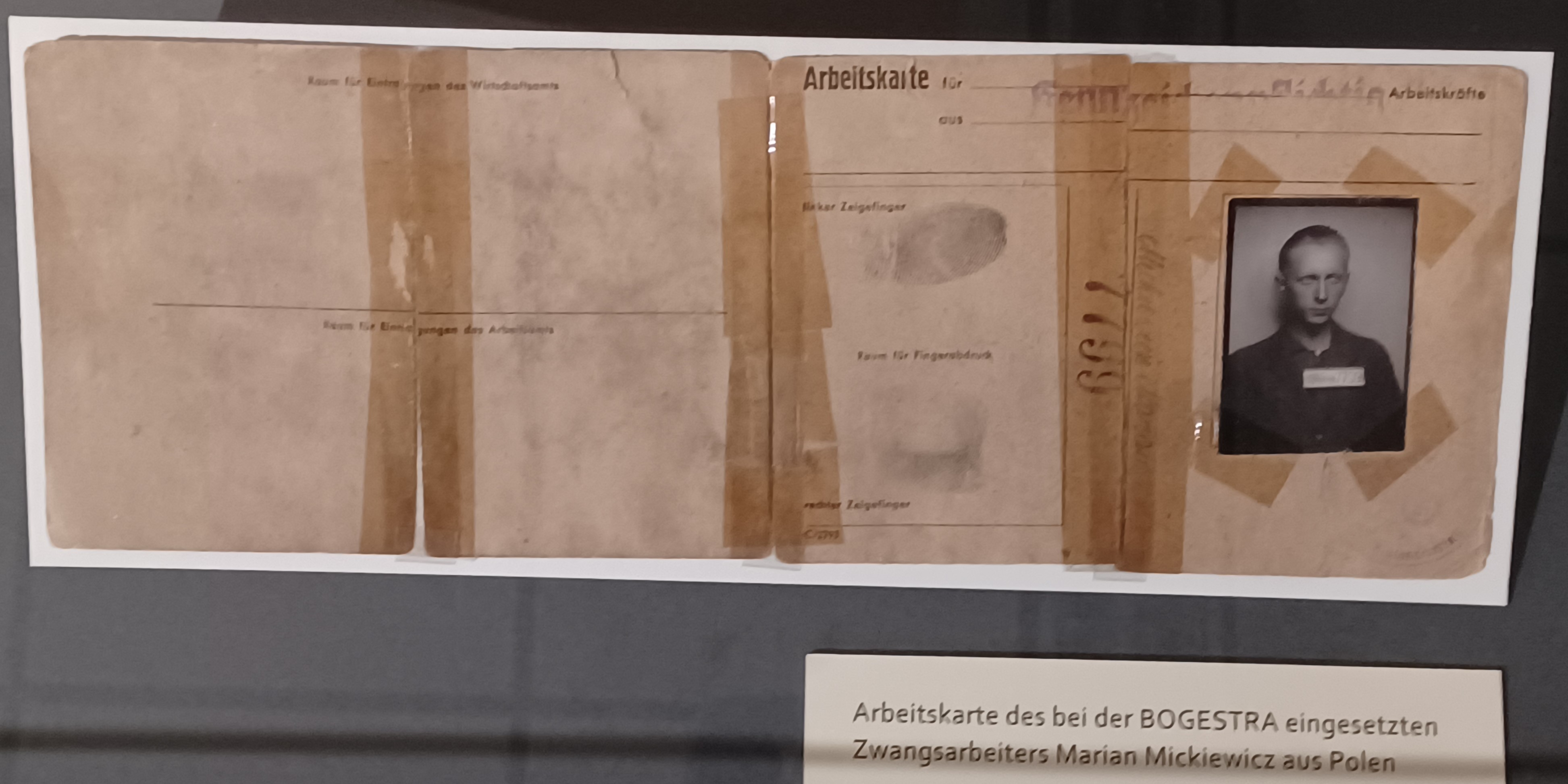
Arbeitskarte

To strengthen control over employment, the Arbeitsamt in the General Government issued so-called work cards (Arbeitskarte), introduced in late 1940. Their equivalent in the territories incorporated into the Reich was the labor book (Arbeitsbuch). On the work card, the employer entered employment details, while the worker received a certificate from the Arbeitsamt confirming possession of the card (Beschäftigungsnachweis). Possessing an Arbeitskarte was a sine qua non condition for legal employment. In the General Government, vocational school students and preparatory course participants were also required to have one. In the Wartheland, all Polish children over the age of 12 had to register with the labor office. Starting in 1941, the issuance of food and clothing rations in the territories annexed to the Reich was contingent on presenting the Arbeitsbuch. In some regions of the General Government, families of individuals who did not register with the Arbeitsamt were denied coal rations.

The Arbeitsamt were responsible for transit camps, where forced labor contingents were housed before being deported to Germany. One such camp was located on 8 Skaryszewska Street in Warsaw. During and after the Warsaw Uprising, Arbeitsamt employees participated in the "selections" and deportations of those able to work, which took place at the Dulag 121 camp in Pruszków.

The Arbeitsamt also oversaw vocational training centers, though their curricula were structured in such a way that Polish workers could not achieve the status of skilled laborers.

The competencies of the Arbeitsamt primarily covered matters related to the registration and use of Polish labor. In the early months of the occupation, however, they did not control Jewish workers, who remained under the authority of the SS and Ordnungspolizei during this period. After some time, the civil administration gained supervision over Jewish labor, only to lose it again in mid-1942, when mass extermination of the Jews began. Additionally, the Baudienst (a forced labor service) did not fall under the jurisdiction of the labor offices.

== Methods of operation ==
The methods used by the Arbeitsamt to exploit Polish labor showed some regional differences. For example, in the territories incorporated into the Reich, no efforts were made to persuade Poles to voluntarily go to Germany for work. A commonly used method was for the Arbeitsamt to issue personalized summons, requiring individuals to report at a specific time and place, under the threat of severe penalties, for transportation to the Reich. In the early months of the occupation, the German authorities managed to register all Poles capable of working. Additionally, with the support of the local German minority, they were able to establish a high degree of police and administrative control over the Polish population. As a result, personalized summons proved to be an effective method in the annexed territories and were used until the end of the occupation.

In the General Government, the labor offices initially attempted to encourage Poles to voluntarily go to Germany for work. When it became clear that propaganda efforts were yielding minimal results, the Germans began resorting to more forceful methods. From that point on, cooperation between the Arbeitsamt, German police formations, paramilitary groups, and the general economic administration steadily increased.

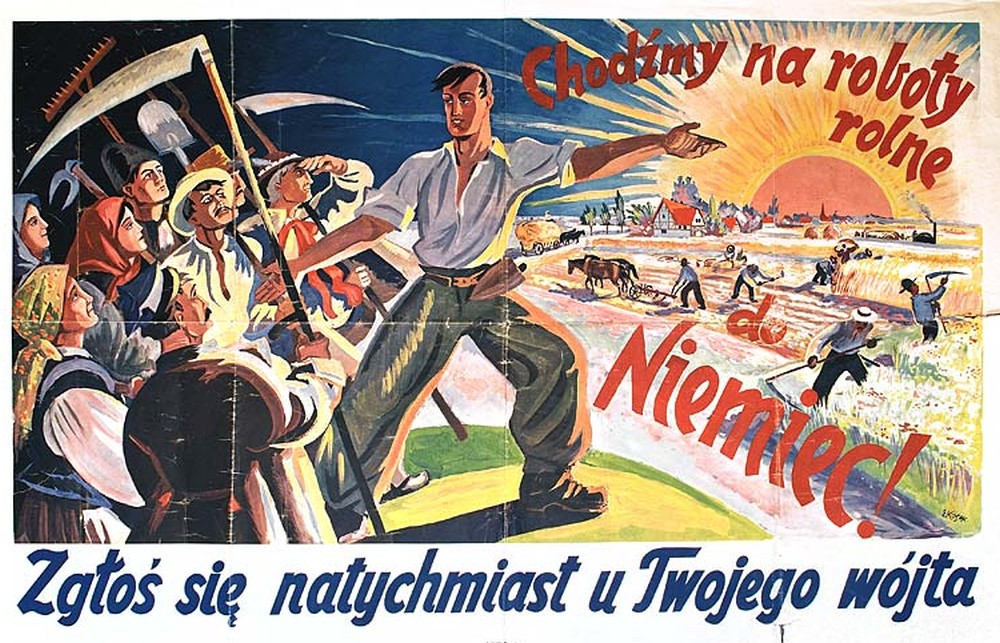
German propaganda poster encouraging voluntary departures for agricultural work in Germany

Similar to the annexed territories, personalized summons were also frequently used in the General Government. In the spring of 1940, during a recruitment campaign for agricultural work in Germany, Polish village heads, mayors, and city officials were required to prepare lists of individuals selected for departure. At the same time, labor quotas were imposed on each district. Based on these lists, the Arbeitsamt issued personalized summons for individuals to report for work in the Third Reich. These contained orders to appear on a specific day and at a specific place. Those who boycotted the summons, as well as their families, faced penalties, including fines, withholding of benefits, property confiscation, imprisonment, or deportation to concentration camps. Communities that failed to meet the demanded labor quotas faced the threat of collective punishment.

Another method of obtaining labor, commonly used in the General Government, were łapanki (roundups), which were conducted on city streets and at train stations. These were organized by the Arbeitsamt in close cooperation with the Ordnungspolizei, and sometimes also with the Wehrmacht. The roundups were often very brutal, and did not spare even cinemas, schools, or churches. At the same time, until the end of the occupation, efforts to encourage Poles to voluntarily depart for work continued.

Forced labor roundups also occurred in the territories annexed to the Reich, though less frequently and primarily in large cities, where there were greater opportunities to evade personalized summons. Additionally, throughout all occupied areas, it was common practice that during pacification or deportation actions, some of the able-bodied individuals were detained and handed over to the Arbeitsamt.

According to Wacław Jastrzębowski, the effectiveness of the Arbeitsamt was low. He estimated that only a portion of the workers at their disposal, perhaps no more than 30%, ultimately went to work in Germany. The rest managed to avoid deportation by paying bribes, fleeing, or obtaining (often false) medical diagnoses. On the other hand, Czesław Łuczak points out that in the annexed territories, the effectiveness of the Arbeitsamt was much higher, especially in smaller towns where it was nearly 100%. Conditions for underground resistance and avoiding German orders were far more difficult in these areas.

According to Łuczak's estimates, between 1939 and 1945, nearly 2,826,500 Polish citizens were deported to forced labor in Germany. Through the Warsaw Arbeitsamt alone, about 86,000 people (9% of the city's population) were deported. In Częstochowa, between January 1942 and December 1944, the local Arbeitsamt was responsible for the deportation of 41,000 people for forced labor.

== Polish resistance against the Arbeitsamt ==
From the first months of the occupation, underground organizations encouraged the Polish population to passively resist the activities of the Arbeitsamt. They called for boycotting labor summons and ignoring recruitment campaigns. Nazi propaganda, which tried to entice Poles to go to Germany by presenting the illusion of supposedly good living conditions awaiting volunteers, was exposed and debunked. Through leaflets, the resistance instructed the public on how to effectively avoid deportation. Some individuals were provided with forged employment certificates, which protected them from being sent to forced labor.

The Arbeitsamt were also the targets of armed actions, which intensified particularly from early 1943. Partisan units of the Home Army and Peasant Battalions attacked offices and their branches, ransacking premises and destroying records of individuals designated for deportation. At least several Arbeitsamt fell victim to these partisan attacks. In Warsaw, members of the Wawer organization smashed windows and destroyed displays in Arbeitsamt offices and recruitment centers. The actions of the resistance caused significant disruptions to the functioning of the occupational labor administration, often effectively paralyzing recruitment in certain areas.

Arbeitsamt officials and particularly zealous recruiters were targets of underground assassinations. On 9 April 1943, soldiers of the Kedyw of the Praga Subdistrict of the Home Army successfully assassinated the head of the Warsaw Arbeitsamt, Curt Gregor Hoffman. Several other officials of the Warsaw Arbeitsamt were also killed by verdicts of the Polish Underground State: Hugo Dietz (13 April 1943), Fritz Geist (10 May 1943), Wilhelm Lübbert (1 February 1944), and Eugen Bollongino (8 June 1944).

In a report dated 12 April 1943, the governor of the Warsaw District, Ludwig Fischer, noted:

What has been achieved by the employees of the Labor Department and in the labor offices in Warsaw and the Warsaw District deserves the highest praise, as all Germans on duty are personally threatened with the greatest danger day after day. During the reporting period, an attack was carried out on the head of the Labor Department, Government Director Hoffman [...] In several outlying offices, all files, records, etc., were destroyed. Polish personnel in the labor offices are systematically intimidated and are leaving for understandable reasons.

Similarly, the head of the labor department in the office of the governor of the Radom District was forced to admit on 26 May 1943 that "due to the influence of the Polish underground, any form of recruitment is impossible".

== Bibliography ==
- Dunin-Wąsowicz, Krzysztof (1987). Raporty Ludwiga Fischera – gubernatora dystryktu warszawskiego 1939–1944 [Reports of Ludwig Fischer – Governor of the Warsaw District 1939–1944] (in Polish). Warsaw: Książka i Wiedza. ISBN 83-05-11197-0.
- Jastrzębowski, Wacław (1946). Gospodarka niemiecka w Polsce 1939–1944 [German Economy in Poland 1939–1944] (in Polish). Warsaw: Czytelnik.
- Komorowski, Krzysztof, ed. (2014). Warszawa walczy 1939–1945. Leksykon [Warsaw Fights 1939–1945: A Lexicon] (in Polish). Warsaw: Fundacja Warszawa Walczy. ISBN 978-83-1113474-4.
- Łuczak, Czesław (2001). Praca przymusowa Polaków w Trzeciej Rzeszy i na okupowanych przez nią terytoriach innych państw (1939–1945) [Forced Labor of Poles in the Third Reich and in Territories Occupied by It (1939–1945)] (in Polish). Poznań: PSO Pracownia Serwisu Oprogramowania. ISBN 83-87073-15-6.
- Pietrzykowski, Jan (1968). Łowy na ludzi. Arbeitsamt w Częstochowie [Manhunts: Arbeitsamt in Częstochowa] (in Polish). Katowice: Śląsk.
- Wardzyńska, Maria (1991). Deportacje na roboty przymusowe z Generalnego Gubernatorstwa 1939–1945 [Deportations for Forced Labor from the General Government 1939–1945] (in Polish). Warsaw: Instytut Pamięci Narodowej.
