= Lublin Holocaust Memorial =

- Polish: Pomnik ku czci masowej eksterminacji ludności żydowskiej, Pomnik ofiar getta
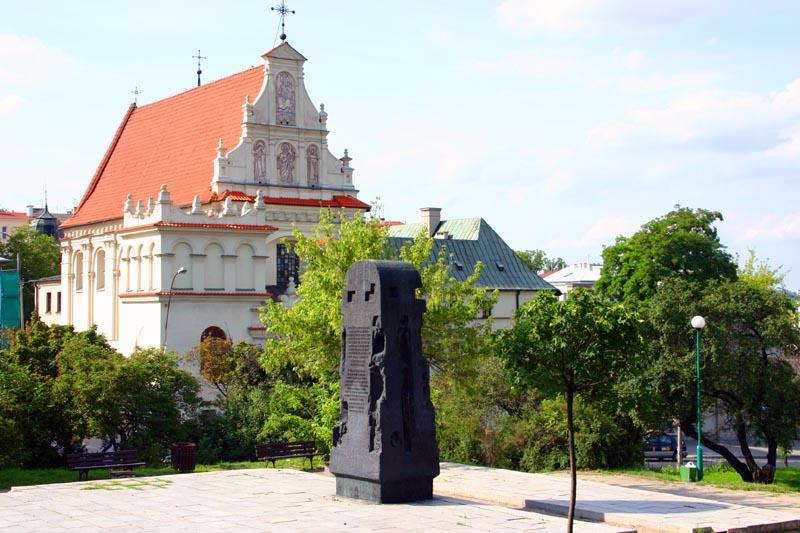
- Interactive map of Lublin Holocaust Memorial
- Location: Lublin, Poland
- Coordinates: 51°14′58″N 22°33′38″E
- Completion date: 1963

The Holocaust Memorial in Lublin (Polish: Pomnik ku czci masowej eksterminacji ludności żydowskiej, Pomnik ofiar getta) commemorates the Jewish inhabitants of the city who were killed during the Holocaust. It was unveiled in 1963.

== History ==
In 2006, a controversy erupted when the city government proposed moving the monument to a different location more distant from the city center in order to free space to build an underground parking lot. After protests from the Jewish community in Poland, it was decided that the monument would be moved to a temporary location while construction is carried out, and then afterwards would be returned to its original location. The move was carried out and, since January 2007, the monument stands on Niecała street. Construction was expected to take 3 years, so the monument was expected be returned around 2010.

== See also ==
- Lipowa 7 camp
- Lublin Ghetto
