= Lipowa 7 camp =

Coordinates: 51.24547°N 22.5495°E

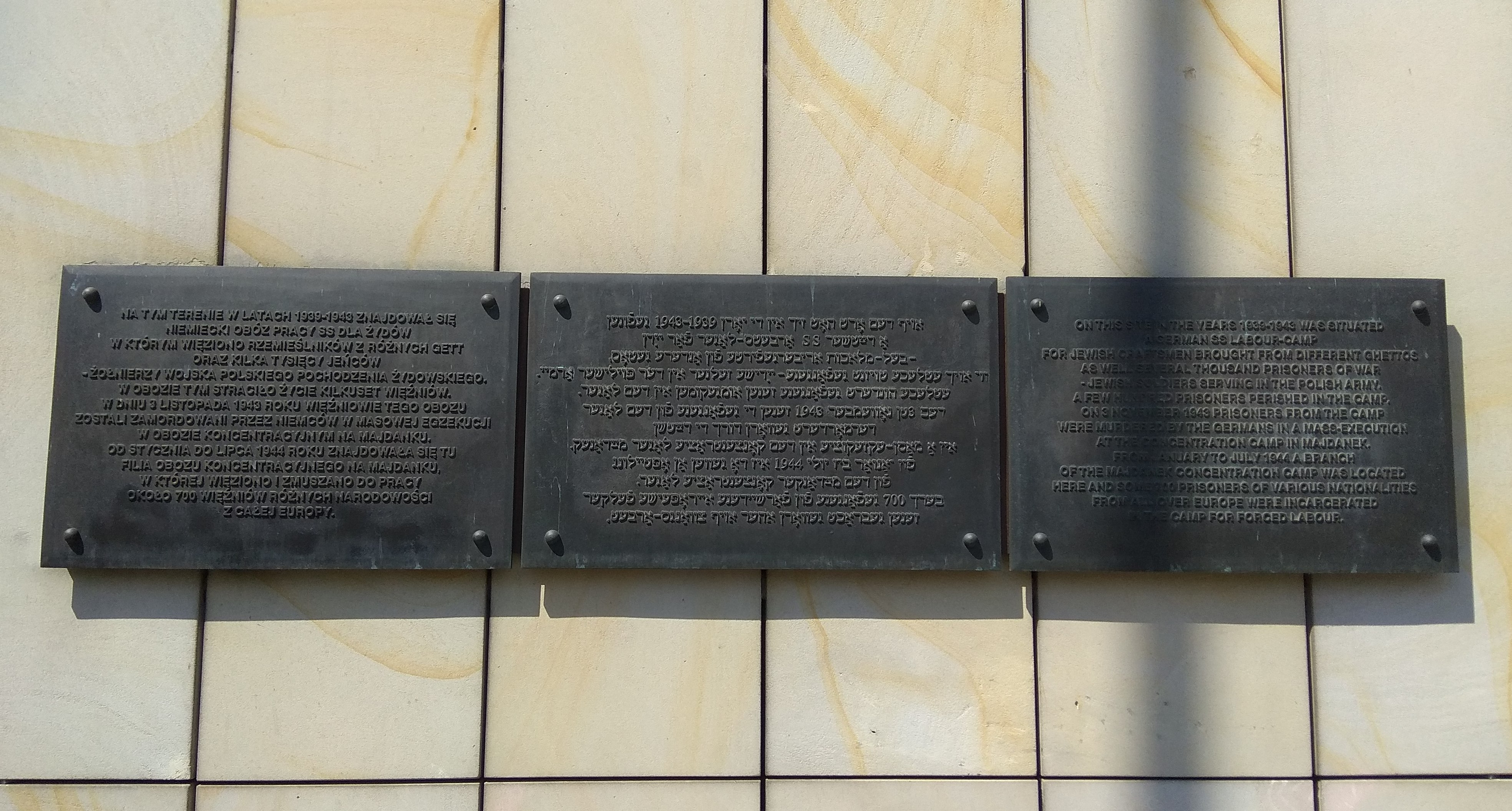
Memorial plaque commemorating the victims of the camp

The Lipowa 7 camp (German: Lindenstraße 7 Lager) was a Nazi forced labor concentration camp, primarily for Jews, by Lipowa Street in Lublin, Poland during December 1939 - 1944. In November 1943 nearly all Jewish inmates were exterminated.

== Operation ==
The Holocaust in Occupied Poland. Lipowa 7 was located in Lublin, near Majdanek.

Initially it was set up as a camp for various kinds of forced labor carried out by men supplied by the Jewish Labour Office (Jüdisches Arbeitsamt) of Lublin, to be operated under the auspices of DAW Lublin (Deutsche Ausrüstungswerke Lublin), DAW Lindenstraße. Gradually it was turned into a confinement camp due to the massive avoiding of work duty and due to the influx of Polish-Jewish and later Soviet POW, as well as imprisoned (non-Jewish) Polish civilians. The camp was established in empty plots between Lipowa 7 and 9, hence the name. In November 1943 during the Operation Harvest Festival the Jewish inmates of the camp were marched out to Majdanek and murdered there, with the exception of few fugitives and a work team designated to remove traces of execution there and a number of other places.

In 1944 the camp was reactivated as a forced work place and became the branch of Majdanek. With the advance of the Soviet Army the inmates were evacuated to various locations, and the camp ceased to exist in July 1944.

== Aftermath ==
After the war the premises were used by the Polish Army until 1960s and subsequently by various businesses. By early 1990s all buildings were destroyed or demolished. In 2007 a shopping mall was constructed on the site. In 2008 a memorial plaque was installed on its wall. It says:

“On this site in the years 1939-1943 was situated a German SS Labour-Camp for Jewish craftsmen brought from different ghettos as well as several thousand prisoners of war – Jewish soldiers serving in the Polish Army. A few hundred prisoners perished in the camp. On 3 November 1943 prisoners from the camp were murdered by the Germans in a mass-execution at the concentration camp in Majdanek. From January to July 1944 a branch of the Majdanek concentration camp was located here and some 700 prisoners of various nationalities from all over Europe were incarcerated in the camp for forced labour.”

== See also ==
- Arbeitsamt in occupied Poland
- Lublin airfield camp
- Lublin Ghetto
- Lublin Holocaust Memorial
- Nisko Plan
