= Gates of Tears =

Holocaust book

Gates of Tears: the Holocaust in the Lublin District
- Publisher: Yad Vashem
- Publication date: 2013
- Pages: 497
- Awards: Finalist for Jewish Book Council awards and the Yad Vashem International Book Prize for Holocaust Research
- ISBN: 978-965-308-464-3

Gates of Tears: the Holocaust in the Lublin District is the first comprehensive study of the Holocaust in the Lublin District of Poland. It was written by David Silberklang and published in 2013 by Yad Vashem.

== Author ==
David Silberklang is an American-born Israeli historian, who is currently the Senior Historian of the International Institute for Holocaust Research at Yad Vashem and the lead editor of Yad Vashem Studies. His 2003 doctoral dissertation at the Hebrew University was titled The Holocaust in the Lublin District.

== Title ==
The title comes from an October 1942 letter written by Rabbi Zvi Elimelech Talmud in the Majdan Tatarski Ghetto, which stated in part:

Only the gates of tears have not been locked before us, and we are able and entitled to bemoan the destruction of our nation, to eulogize the rupture in our destroyed people, and to lead the river of our tears with us to the grave. This they cannot take from us. And He who sits on high in heaven hid His face, and hidden will His soul weep, depressed and downtrodden.

The title also references the Talmudic teaching: "Rabbi Elazar said, 'Since the day of the ruin of the Temple, the gates of prayer have been locked. Although the gates of prayer have been locked, the gates of tears have not been locked" (Berakhot 32b).

== Contents ==
Although some 250–300,000 Jews lived in the Lublin District prior to the war, there was a lack of scholarship on the region. Unlike other historians who had written on the subject, such as Bogdan Musiał, Dieter Pohl, and Christopher Browning, Silberklang makes extensive use of Jewish sources in Yiddish and Hebrew.

Nine chapters, thematically organized, discuss such issues as the Nisko Plan, German administration, forced labor, and deportations to the extermination camps. Silberklang demonstrates that the initial phase of ghettoization occurred in a haphazard way subject to local influences. Although knowledge of the purpose of Bełżec extermination camp was widespread, Jews were not able to use this knowledge to save their lives. Even when Jewish partisans stormed the labor camp at Janiszów and urged the 600 Jewish prisoners to escape, most of the Jews (both partisans and former prisoners) soon perished following roundups, in which local Poles participated. Silberklang argues (contrary to Raul Hilberg) that Ostindustrie was turning a profit off of Jewish slave labor, and that labor camps had the best chance to survive (especially after Operation Harvest Festival in November 1943) if they were profitable for local German administrators and did not attract the attention of higher authorities. Extermination was sudden and brutal—of 300,000 Jews alive in the area at the beginning of 1942, only 20,000 were alive a year later—while survival was random, unlikely, and determined by factors that were outside of the control of Jewish victims.

Silberklang argues that, contrary to the centrality of Auschwitz-Birkenau in Holocaust studies, Bełżec was "perhaps the place most representative of the totality and finality of the Nazi plans for Jews". He also criticizes the tendency to generalize from the well-studied example of the Warsaw Ghetto (also the Łódź Ghetto) to the Holocaust in Poland as a whole. According to Silberklang,

The search for a mythical heroism has at times been so overpowering that Jewish activities during the Holocaust have been examined largely from that vantage point—the extent to which Jews’ activities in their efforts to survive were dangerous and heroic… Most Jews, it may be assumed, did all they could to survive… But could all Jews have been heroes? What can such a perspective say about all the people who lived and died as ordinary mortals and not as heroes on pedestals?

== Reception ==
Samuel Kassow describes Gates of Tears as a "superb book, based on massive archival research". A review by Andrea Löw in sehepunkte, stated that the book is the first comprehensive study of the Holocaust in the Lublin District. Laurence Weinbaum writes, "His incisive and analytical book is an outstanding contribution to the rapidly expanding literature on the destruction of local Jewish communities and regional centers."

The book was a finalist in both the Jewish Book Council awards and the Yad Vashem International Book Prize for Holocaust Research.
