= Radom District =

Radom District Distrikt Radom
- Coat of arms

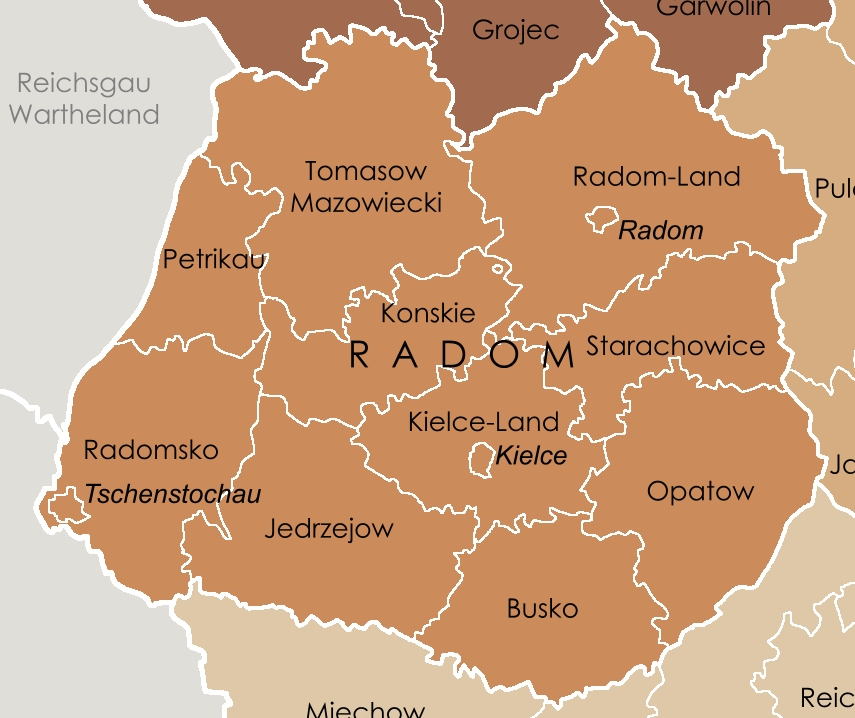
- Administrative map of Radom District.

Radom District was one of the first four Nazi districts of the General Governorate region of German-occupied Poland during World War II, along with Warsaw District, Lublin District, and Kraków District. To the west it bordered Reichsgau Wartheland and East Upper Silesia.

The district's governors were Karl Lasch from 1939 to 1941, followed by Ernst Kundt until 1945. It is estimated that the district's population in 1940 was approximately 3 million people, including almost 400,000 Jews.
