= Lublin District =

Lublin District Distrikt Lublin
- Coat of arms

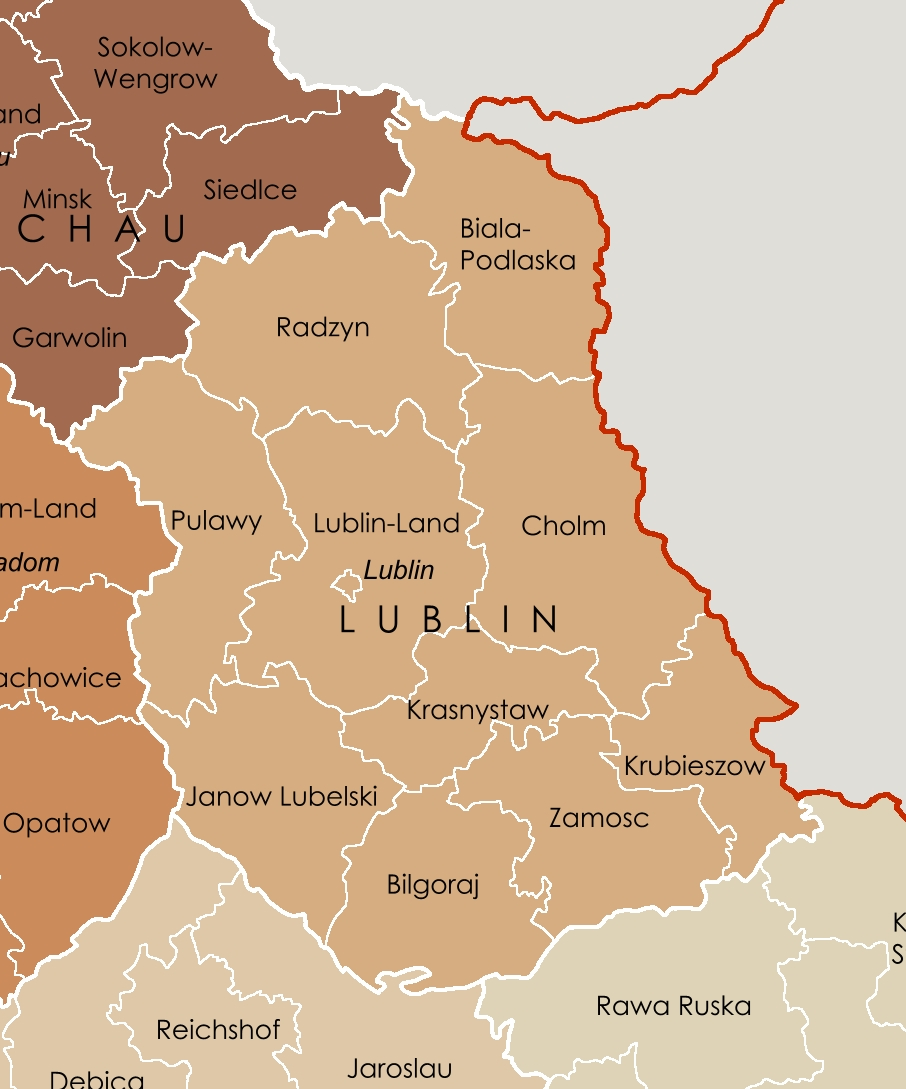
- Administrative map of Lublin District.

Lublin District (German: Distrikt Lublin) was one of the first four Nazi districts of the General Governorate region of German-occupied Poland during World War II, along with Warsaw District, Radom District, and Kraków District. On the south and east, it initially bordered the Soviet Union. After Operation Barbarossa, it bordered Reichskommissariat Ukraine to the east and Galizien District to the south, which was also part of the General Governorate.

== Nisko Plan ==
The Nisko Plan was an operation organized by Nazi Germany to deport Jews to the Lublin District of the General Governorate of occupied Poland in 1939. The plan was developed in September 1939, after the invasion of Poland, and implemented between October 1939 and April 1940, in contrast to the similar Nazi "Madagascar Plan" and other Jewish relocation plans that had been drawn up before the attack on Poland, at the beginning of World War II. It bore similarities to the American Indian reservations. The plan was cancelled in early 1940.

== See also ==
- Madagascar Plan
- Nisko Plan
- Occupation of Poland (1939–1945)
- The Holocaust in Poland#Resettlement plans
