= The Holocaust in Poland =

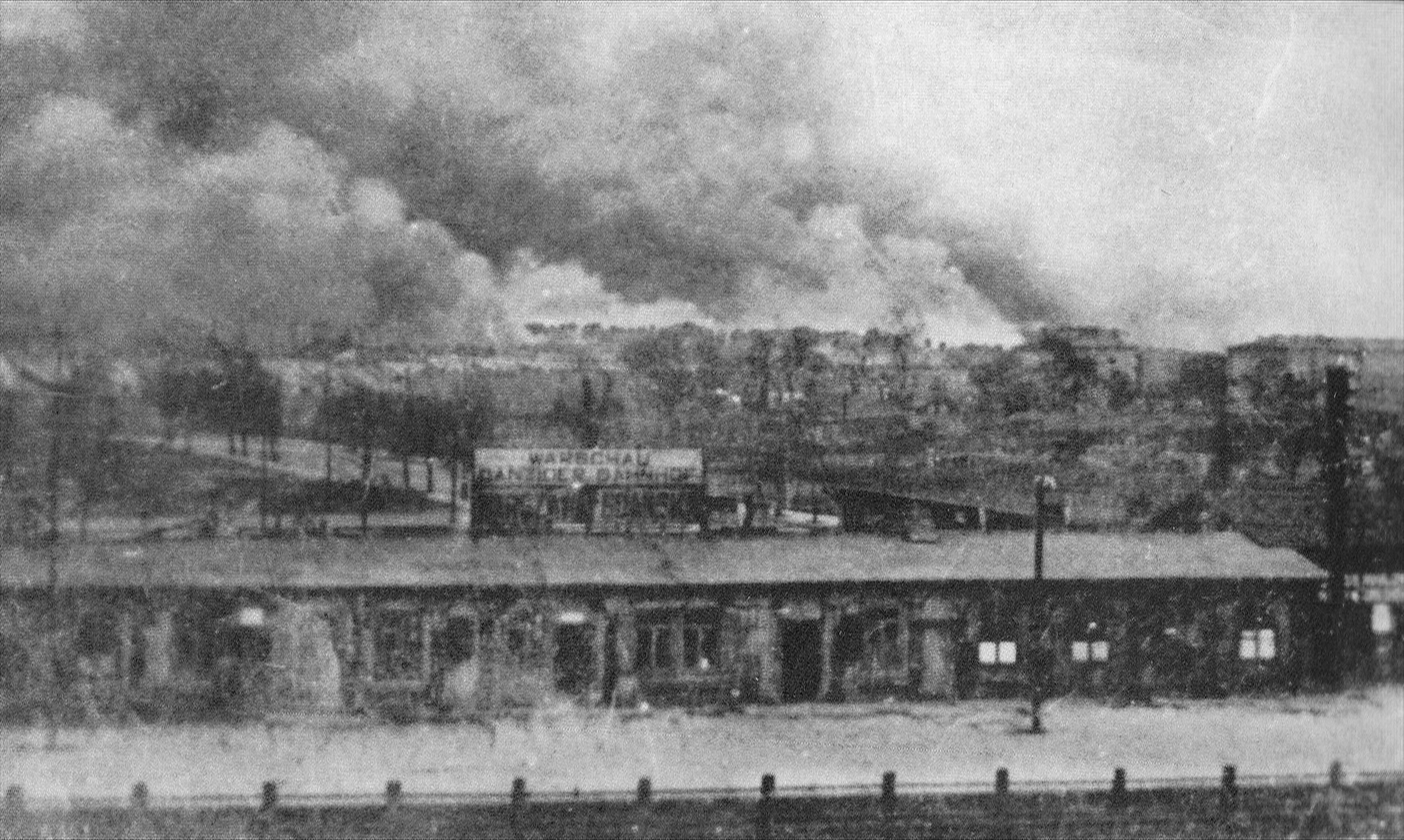
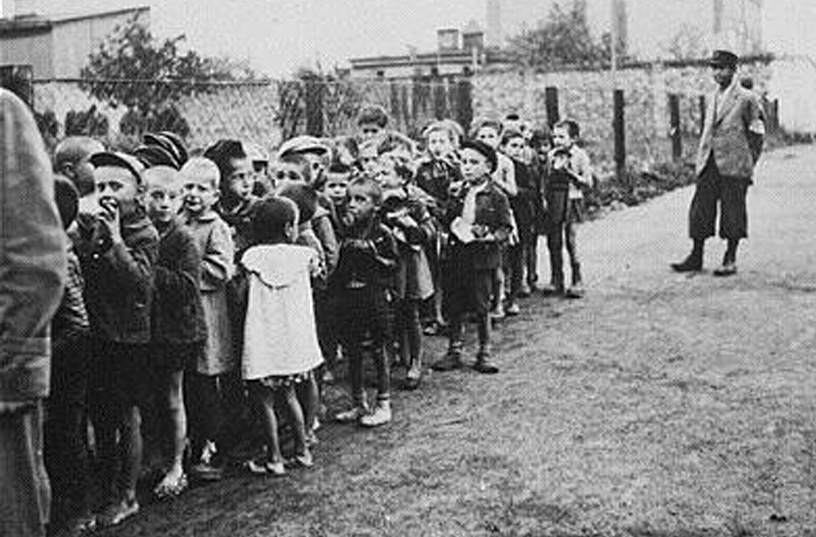
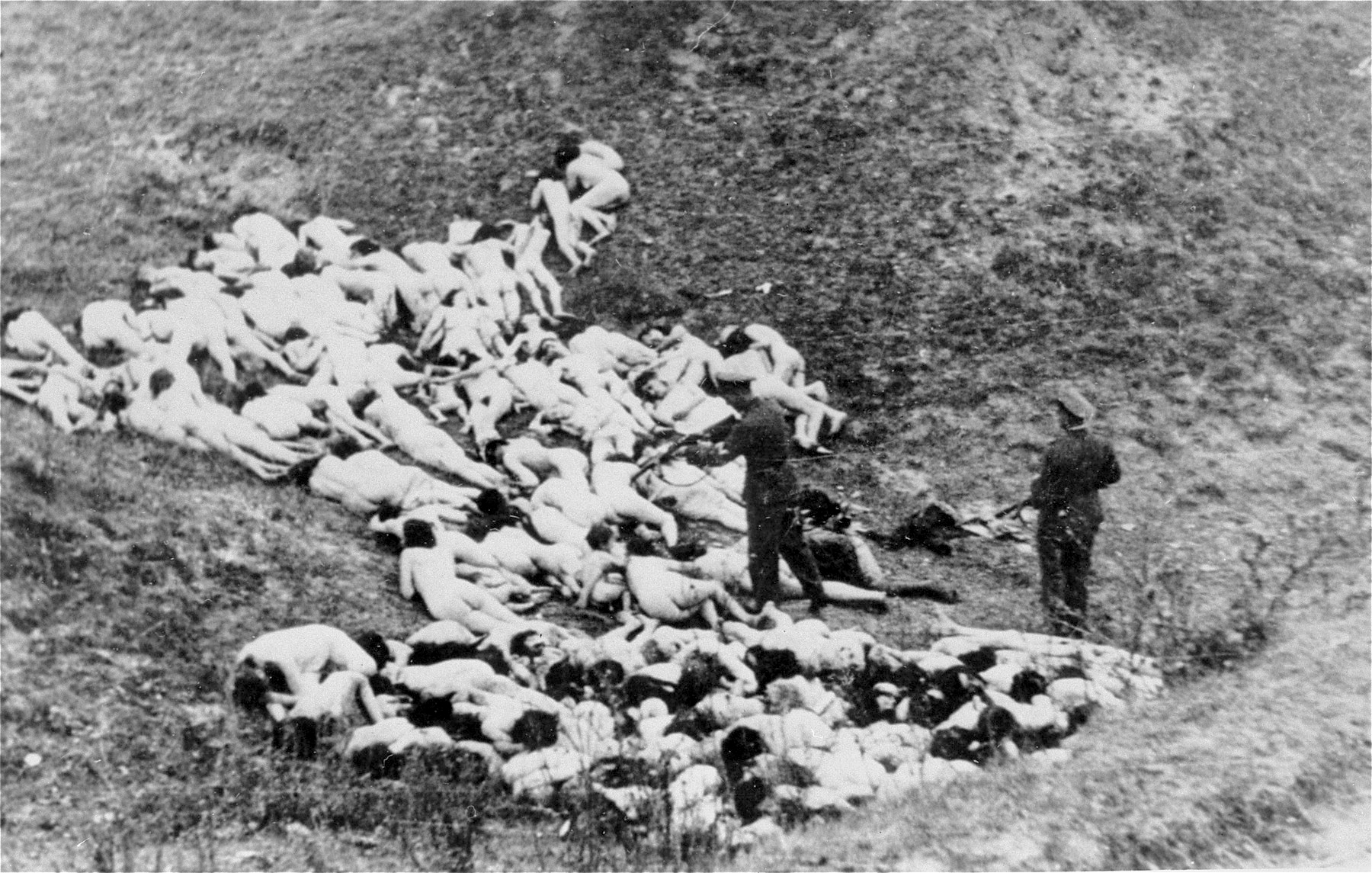
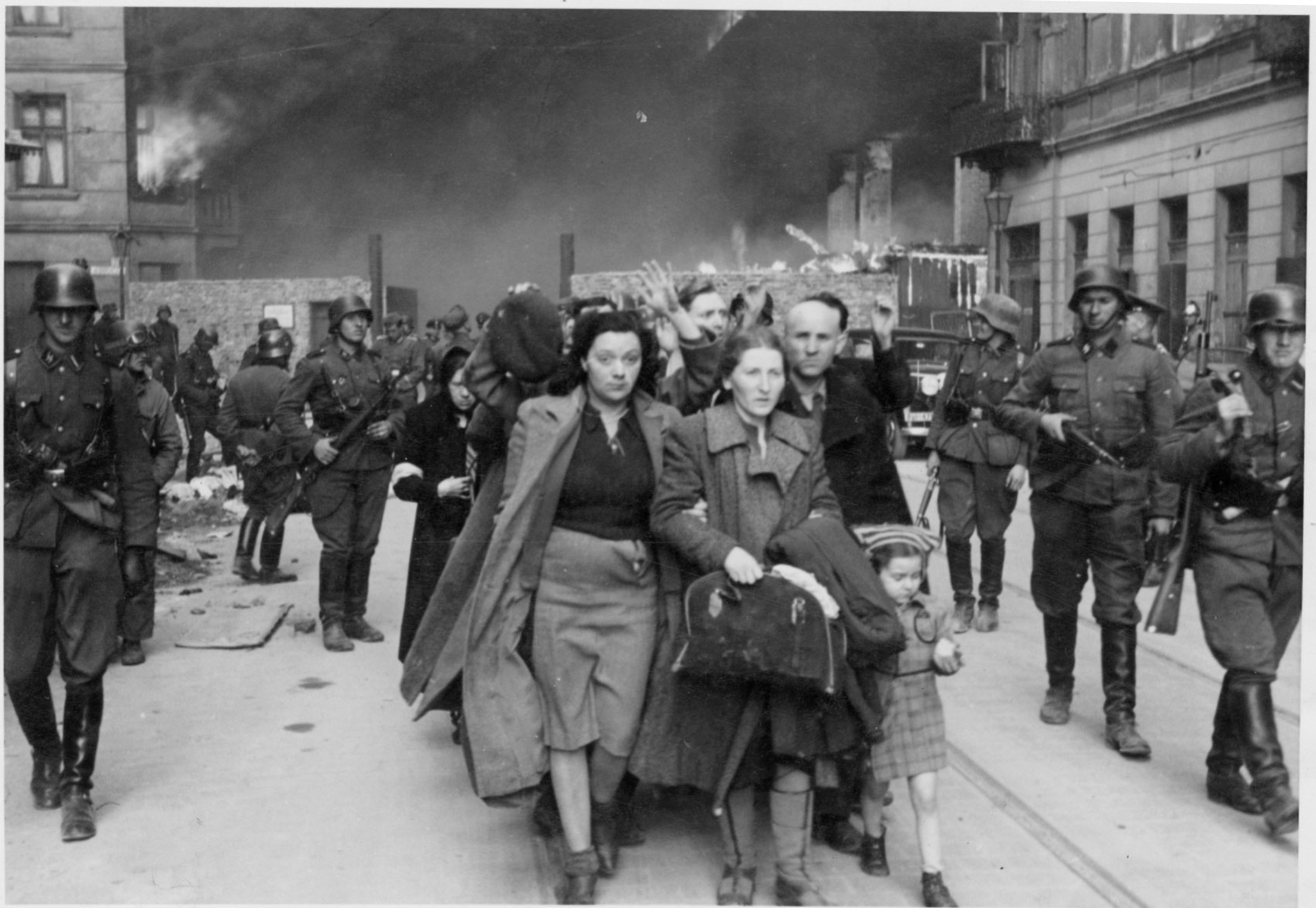
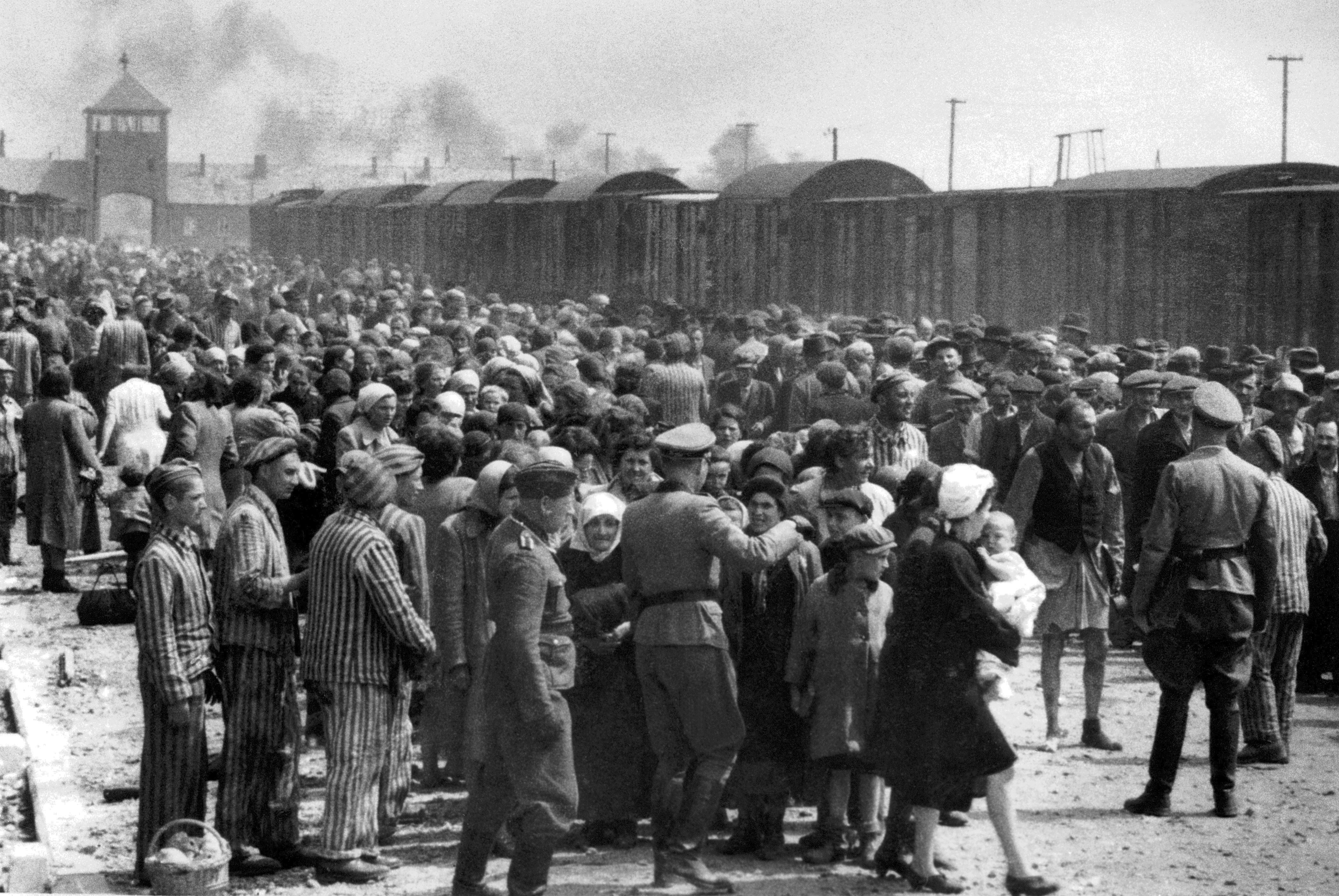
- Top, clockwise: Warsaw Ghetto burning, May 1943 • Einsatzgruppe shooting of women from the Mizocz Ghetto, 1942 • Selection of people to be sent directly to the gas chamber right after their arrival at Auschwitz-II Birkenau • Jews captured in the Warsaw Ghetto Uprising led to the Umschlagplatz by Waffen SS • Łódź Ghetto children deported to Chełmno death camp, 1942

Overview
- Period: 1941–1945
- Territory: Occupied Poland, also present day western Ukraine and western Belarus among others
- Perpetrators: Nazi Germany along with its collaborators
- Killed: 3,000,000 Polish Jews
- Survivors: 157,000–375,000 in the Soviet Union; 50,000 liberated from Nazi concentration camps 30,000–60,000 in hiding

The Holocaust saw the ghettoization, robbery, deportation and mass murder of Jews in occupied Poland by Nazi Germany. Over three million Polish Jews were murdered, primarily at the Chełmno, Belzec, Sobibor, Treblinka and Auschwitz extermination camps, who made up half of the Jewish Holocaust victims.

During Nazi occupation, the country lost 20% of its population, or six million people, including three million Jews (90% of the country's Jewish population). In 1939, Nazi Germany invaded Poland while the Soviet Union invaded Poland from the east. In German-occupied Poland, Jews were killed, subjected to forced labor, and forced to move to ghettos. Some 7,000 Jews were killed in 1939, but open mass killings subsided until June of 1941. The Soviet Union deported many Jews to the Soviet interior, where most survived the war. In 1941, Germany invaded the Soviet Union and began the systematic murder of Jews. 1.8 million Jews were killed in Operation Reinhard, shot in roundups in ghettos, died during the train journey, or killed by poison gas in the extermination camps. In 1943 and 1944, the remaining labor camps and ghettos were liquidated. Many Jews tried to escape, but surviving in hiding was very difficult due to factors such as the lack of money to pay helpers and the risk of denunciation. Only 1 to 2 percent of Polish Jews in German-occupied territory survived. After the war, survivors faced difficulties in regaining their property and rebuilding their lives. Especially after the Kielce pogrom, many fled to displaced persons camps in Allied-occupied Germany.

== Background ==
Jews have lived in Poland since the twelfth century. Many Polish Jews settled on noble estates where they were offered protection in exchange for the economic benefits they could provide. An estimated 3 million Jews lived in Poland in 1933, around ten percent of the population. Due to historical restrictions on what occupations Jews were allowed to have, they became concentrated in trades such as commerce and craftsmen. Many lived in small towns called shtetls. After the foundation of the Second Polish Republic simultaneously with the armistice of 11 November 1918 ending World War I, Jews suffered from institutionalized discrimination and many were poor.

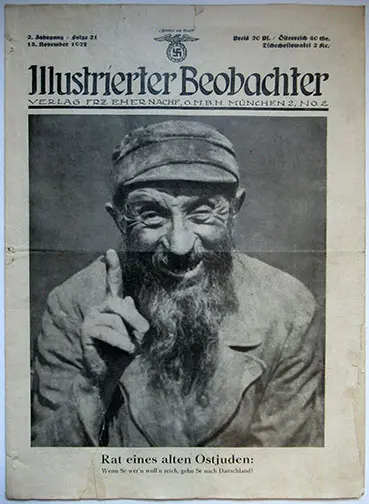
Cover of a German Nazi Party magazine Illustrierter Beobachter of November 15, 1927, showing the depiction of the stereotypical Ostjude

Anti-Semitism became a state ideology in Germany after the Nazis gained power, but even before that, Eastern European Jews, called in Germany Ostjuden held a particularly low position in German perception. Jews in Germany tended to be secularized and largely assimilated into German society, while most Polish Jews lived in traditionalist religious communities, speaking Yiddish and distinguishing themselves in dress and customs from their surroundings. Prejudice was intensified during World War I, when many Jews from the occupied eastern territories moved to Germany. They were accused by antisemitic press and politicians of criminal activity, lack of hygiene, spreading disease, speculation, trafficking of women, spreading revolution, and were eventually blamed for Germany's defeat in the war and interwar economic problems faced by Germany. Soon, especially in the Nazi press, the term Ostjude began to be used as a slur, and as a synonym for Bolshevik and Communist. In the interwar period Polish Jews in Germany faced also legal persecution. In 1918, the Prussian Ministry of the Interior banned Polish Jews from entering the country on the pretext of their unwillingness to work, low morals, physical uncleanliness and the spread of typhus by them. In 1923, the Bavarian government ordered the deportation of Jews with Polish citizenship as undesirables.

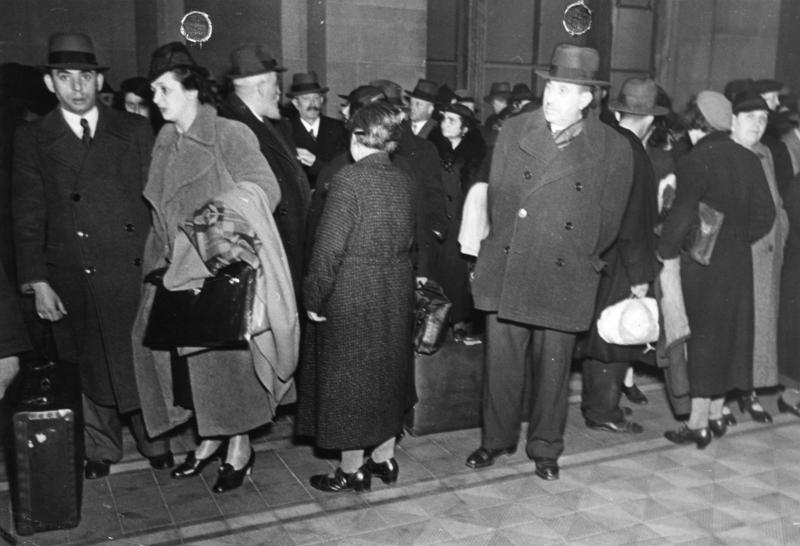
Polish Jews expelled from Nuremberg

In Poland, after the beginning of the Great Depression and the death of Marshal Józef Piłsudski in 1935, the situation of Polish Jews worsened. The Endecja faction waged a campaign against Jews consisting of economic boycotts, limitations on the number of Jewish students at universities, and restrictions on kosher slaughter. The Polish government stated its intention to "settle the Jewish problem" by the emigration of most Polish Jews. In 1938, after Poland passed a law to denaturalize Jews living abroad, Germany expelled all Polish Jews in October 1938. Because Poland refused to admit them, these Jews were stranded in no-man's land along the border.

== Invasion of Poland ==
The German Wehrmacht (armed forces) invaded Poland on 1 September 1939, triggering declarations of war from the United Kingdom and France. During the invasion of Poland as many as 16,000 civilians, hostages, and prisoners of war may have been shot by the German invaders; there was also a great deal of looting. Special units known as Einsatzgruppen followed the army to eliminate any possible resistance. Already during the hostilities, the Germans carried out pogroms against the Jewish population, for example, 600 people were murdered in Przemyśl, 200 in Częstochowa, and 200 were burned in a synagogue in Będzin. Thousands of Jews were chased away to areas occupied by Soviet troops. 6,000 Polish soldiers of Jewish descent were killed and 60,000 were taken prisoner.

Germany gained control of 1.7 million Jews in Poland. Parts of western and northern Poland were annexed into Germany and incorporated into the administrative structure of the German Reich as Zichenau, Danzig–West Prussia, the Wartheland, and East Upper Silesia—while the rest of the German-occupied territories were designated the General Government. Around 50,000 Polish leaders and intellectuals were arrested or executed, especially in West Prussia, with fewer victims in the Wartheland and fewer still in the General Government. Polish Jewish intellectuals and community leaders were not spared. Around 400,000 Poles were expelled from the Wartheland to the General Governorate occupation zone from 1939 to 1941, and the area was resettled by ethnic Germans from eastern Europe.

The rest of Poland was occupied by the Soviet Union, which invaded Poland from the east on 17 September pursuant to the German–Soviet pact. Approximately 1.6 million Polish Jews came under Soviet rule, 250-300,000 of whom were refugees or expellees from the German occupation zone. Of the refugees, 35-40,000 people were forced in late autumn 1939 to go deep into Ukraine and Belarus to work. The Soviet Union deported hundreds of thousands of Polish citizens to the Soviet interior in four big deportations. The Jews were particularly affected by the third one, which began on 28/29 June 1940, which affected refugees willing to return to the area under German rule, but to whose return the Germans did not agree. More than 77,700 Jewish refugees were deported at this time, representing 84% of the total deportees. The fourth deportation included 7,000 Jews from the Vilnius region. Although most Jews were not pro-communist, some accepted positions in the Soviet administration, contributing to a pre-existing perception among many non-Jews that Soviet rule was a Jewish conspiracy. Some 10,000 Polish Jews had left the USSR for Palestine, the Middle East and the West by June 1941.

== Resettlement plans ==
As a result of expulsions and escapes, about 500,000 Jews lived in the lands incorporated into the Reich at the beginning of the German occupation. The Germans planned to deport all Jews from these territories by the end of 1940, by which time the plan was to place them in ghettos. They tried to concentrate Jews in the Lublin District of the General Government. 45,000 Jews were deported by November and left to fend for themselves, causing many deaths. Deportations stopped in early 1940 due to the opposition of Hans Frank, the appointed head of the General Government, who did not want his fiefdom to become a dumping ground for unwanted Jews. Overall, between 80-90,000 Jews were deported to the General Government from Wartheland in that time. At the same time, escapes, expulsions and murders continued unabated. As a result of these, only 1,800 Jews lived in the province of West Prussia in February 1940. In the Wartheland, their number dropped to 260,000. Deportations to the General Government resumed in January 1941, but only 2140 Jews and 20,000 Poles were deported from Wartheland.

At this point, efforts to concentrate Jews in a compact territory were abandoned, the focus was on separating and enclosing Jews in ghettos. However, such plans were not completely dropped. After the conquest of France in 1940, the Nazis considered deporting Jews to French Madagascar, but this proved impossible. The Nazis planned that harsh conditions in these areas would kill many Jews. After the attack on the Soviet Union, plans were made to remove the Jewish population to the swampy areas of Polesia. In the fall of 1941, any such plans were abandoned.

== Ghettoization ==
Jews in front of the Warsaw Ghetto wall (1940–1943).

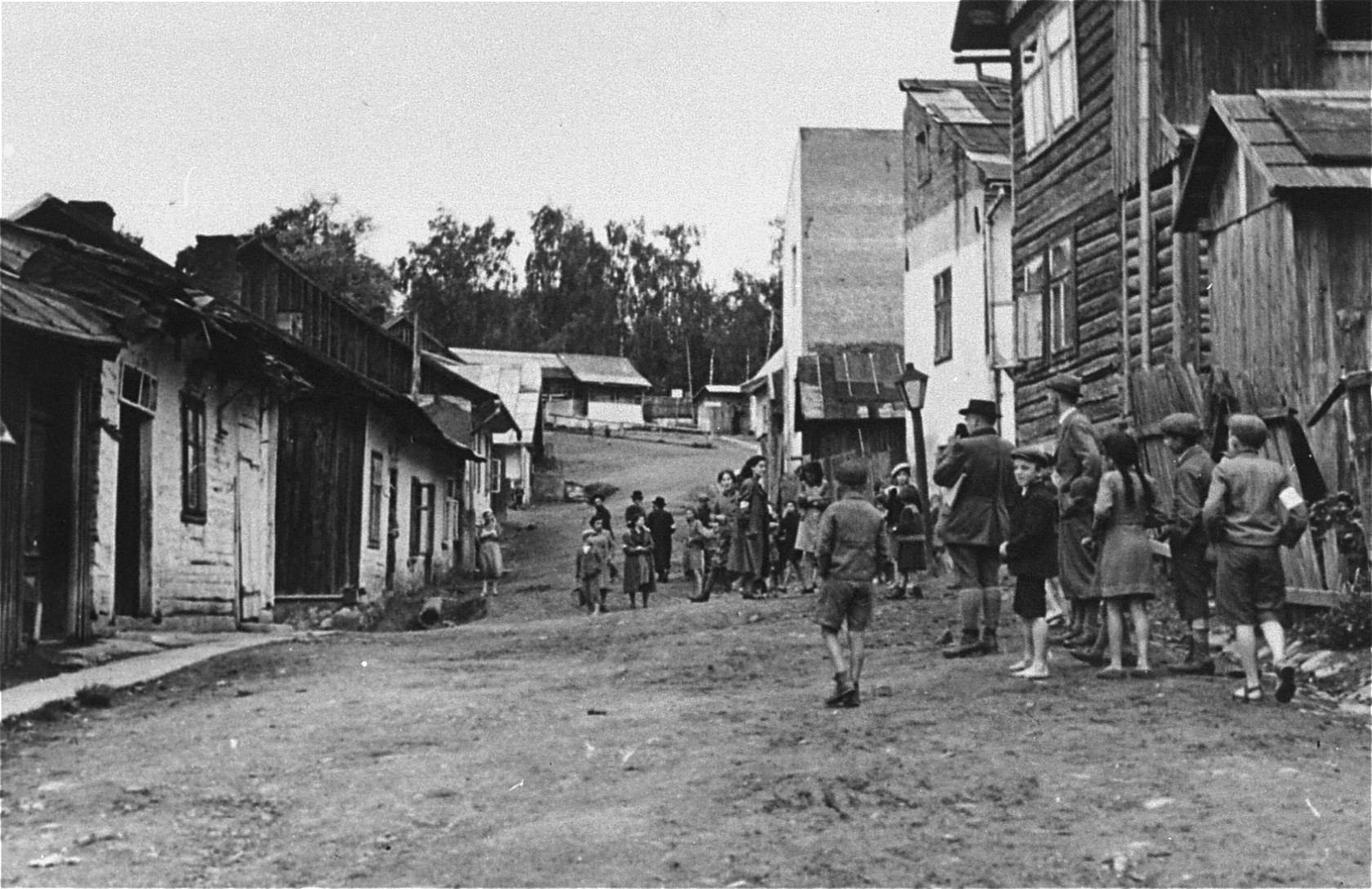
Unpaved street in the Frysztak Ghetto, Kraków District

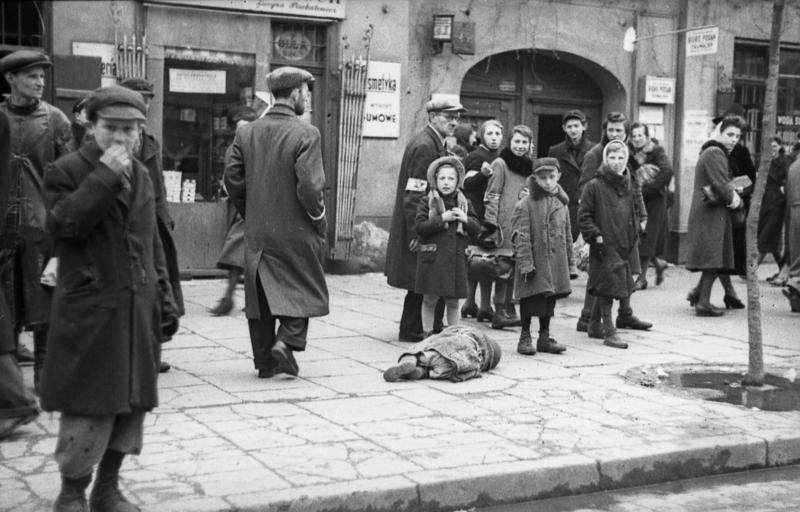
A body lying in the street of the Warsaw Ghetto in the General Government

During the invasion, synagogues were burned and thousands of Jews fled or were expelled into the Soviet occupation zone. Various anti-Jewish regulations were soon issued. In October 1939, adult Jews in the General Government were required to perform forced labor. In November 1939 they were ordered to wear white armbands. Laws decreed the seizure of most Jewish property and the takeover of Jewish-owned businesses. When Jews were forced into ghettos, they lost their homes and belongings.

The first Nazi ghettos were established in the Wartheland and General Government in 1939 and 1940 on the initiative of local German administrators. The largest ghettos, such as Warsaw and Łódź, were established in existing residential neighborhoods and closed by fences or walls. In many smaller ghettos, Jews were forced into poor neighborhoods but with no fence. Forced labor programs provided subsistence to many ghetto inhabitants, and in some cases protected them from deportation. Workshops and factories were operated inside some ghettos, while in other cases Jews left the ghetto to work outside it. Because the ghettos were not segregated by sex some family life continued. A Jewish community leadership (Judenrat) exercised some authority and tried to sustain the Jewish community while following German demands. As a survival strategy, many tried to make the ghettos useful to the occupiers as a labor reserve.

The Warsaw ghetto contained more Jews than all of France; the Łódź ghetto more Jews than all of the Netherlands. More Jews lived in the city of Kraków than in all of Italy, and virtually any medium-sized town in Poland had a larger Jewish population than all of Scandinavia. All of southeast Europe – Hungary, Romania, Bulgaria, Yugoslavia, and Greece – had fewer Jews than the original four districts of the General Government.

The plight of Jews in war-torn Poland could be divided into stages defined by the existence of the ghettos. In Warsaw, up to 80 percent of food consumed in the ghetto was brought in illegally. The food stamps introduced by the Germans provided only 9 percent of the calories necessary for survival. Most ghettos were not fully sealed from the outside world and although many Jews suffered from hunger, fewer died from it because they were able to supplement their rations from the black market. The 'productionists' among the German authorities – who attempted to make the ghettos self-sustaining by turning them into enterprises – prevailed over the 'attritionists' only after the German invasion of the Soviet Union. The most prominent ghettos were thus temporarily stabilized through the production of goods needed at the front, as death rates among the Jewish population there began to decline.

Ghettos were established both in the territory incorporated into the Reich and in the General Government. Characteristic of the Wartheland were the so-called "rural ghettos," which encompassed several contiguous villages. The Germans also set up ghettos in areas of eastern Poland occupied as a result of the invasion of the Soviet Union in 1941. Most were established in the Galicia district and the Białystok District. In the fall of 1942, there were more than 400 ghettos on Polish soil.

== Extermination of Jews in Eastern Poland ==
Germany and its allies invaded the Soviet Union on 22 June 1941. Around 100,000 Polish Jews fled deep into the USSR from German soldiers. The Wehrmacht was followed by four special groups (Einsatzgruppen) which perpetrated mass executions of the Jewish population. From September 1941, entire Jewish communities were liquidated. The General Government was expanded by adding Galicia District; the Białystok District was administered separately. During the invasion, local inhabitants carried out at least 219 pogroms, killing around twenty-five thousand to fifty thousand Jews. The pogroms were extremely violent with many Jews beaten, raped, stolen from, and brutally murdered. Although German forces tried to incite pogroms, their role in causing violence is controversial. According to political science research, pogroms were most likely to occur "where political polarization was high, where the Jewish community was large, and where Jews pressed for national equality in the decades before 1941".

Parallel to Operation Reinhard, which was organised in the General Government, the final mass murder of the Jewish population was organised in eastern Poland in the spring and summer of 1942. Jews from the Galicia district were transported to the extermination centres at Belzec and Sobibor, among them some 150,000 Jews deported to Galicia by the Romanian authorities.

== Liquidation of the ghettos ==
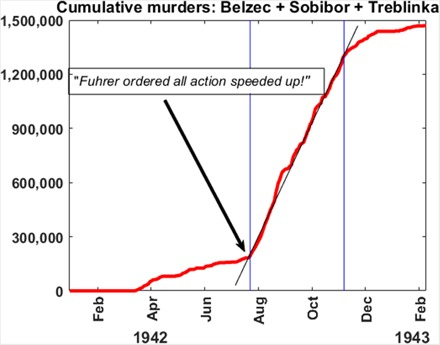
Cumulative murders of Jews from the General Government at Belzec, Sobibor, and Treblinka from January 1942 to February 1943

Plans to kill most of the Jews in the General Government were affected by various goals of the SS (Schutzstaffel), military, and civil administration, stretching from purely racial goals to more pragmatic ones, such as the need to reduce the amount of food consumed by Jews— thus enabling a slight increase in rations to non-Jewish Poles, a partial defense against the black market, and the avoidance of both hunger and an increase in resistance among them. By mid-1942, Nazi leaders decided to allow only 300,000 Jews to survive in the General Government by the end of the year for forced labor; for the most part, only those working in armaments production were spared. On 19 July, Himmler decreed the "resettlement of the entire Jewish population of the General Government should have been implemented and completed by 31 December 1942"; henceforth, Jews would only be allowed to live in Warsaw, Częstochowa, Kraków, and Majdanek. The majority of ghettos were liquidated in mass executions nearby, especially if they were not near a train station. Larger ghettos were more commonly liquidated during multiple deportations to extermination camps. During this campaign around 1.8 million Jews were murdered in the largest killing operation of the Holocaust.

In order to reduce resistance the ghetto would be raided without warning, usually in the early morning, and the extent of the operation would be concealed as long as possible. Trawniki men (Trawnikimänner) made up of Soviet prisoners-of-war or Polish Blue Police would cordon off the ghetto while the German Order Police and Security Police carried out the action. In addition to local non-Jewish collaborators, the Jewish councils and Jewish ghetto police were often ordered to assist with liquidation actions, although these Jews were in most cases murdered later. Chaotic, capriciously executed selections determined who would be loaded onto the trains. Many Jews were shot during the action—making up perhaps 20 percent or more of the total deaths—often leaving ghettos strewn with corpses. Surviving Jews were forced to clean up the bodies and collect any valuables from the victims.

=== Extermination camps ===
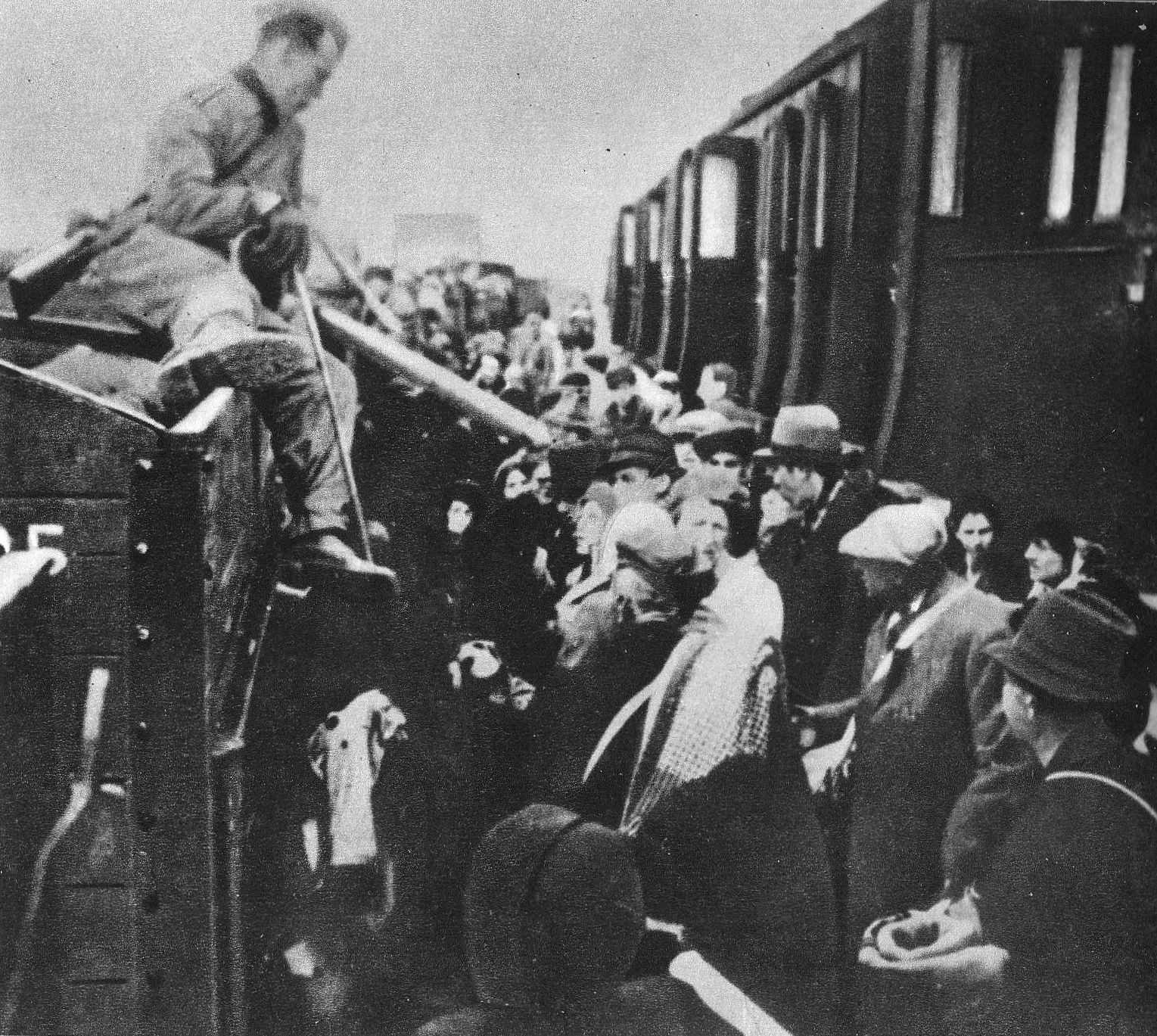
Deportation to Chełmno

Gas vans developed from those used to kill mental patients since 1939 were assigned to the Einsatzgruppen and first used in November 1941; victims were forced into the van and killed with engine exhaust. The first extermination camp was Chełmno in the Wartheland, established on the initiative of the local civil administrator Arthur Greiser with Himmler's approval; it began operations in December 1941 using gas vans. In October 1941, Higher SS and Police Leader of Lublin Odilo Globocnik began work planning Belzec—the first purpose-built extermination camp to feature stationary gas chambers—amid increasing talk among German administrators in Poland of large-scale murder of Jews in the General Government. In late 1941 in East Upper Silesia, Jews in forced-labor camps operated by the Schmelt Organization deemed "unfit for work" began to be sent in groups to Auschwitz where they were murdered. In March 1942, killings began in Belzec, targeting Jews from Lublin who were not capable of work. This action reportedly reduced the black market and was deemed a success to be replicated elsewhere. Belzec was the prototype camp on which the others were based.

The camps were located on rail lines to make it easier to transport Jews to their deaths, but in remote places to avoid notice. The stench caused by mass killing operations was noticeable to anyone nearby. People were typically deported to the camps in overcrowded cattle cars. As many as 150 people were forced into a single boxcar. Many died en route, partly because of the low priority accorded to these transports. Shortage of rail transport sometimes led to postponement or cancellation of deportations. Upon arrival, the victims were robbed of their remaining possessions, forced to undress, had their hair cut, and were chased into the gas chamber. Death from the gas was agonizing and could take as long as 30 minutes. The gas chambers were primitive and sometimes malfunctioned. Some prisoners were shot because the gas chambers were not functioning. At other extermination camps, nearly everyone on a transport was killed on arrival, but at Auschwitz around 20-25 percent were separated out for labor, although many of these prisoners died later on.

Belzec, Sobibor, and Treblinka reported a combined revenue of RM 178.7 million from belongings stolen from their victims, far exceeding costs. Combined, the camps required the labor of less than 3,000 Jewish prisoners, 1,000 Trawniki men (largely Ukrainian auxiliaries), and very few German guards. About half of the Jews killed in the Holocaust died by poison gas. Thousands of Romani people were also murdered in the extermination camps. Prisoner uprisings at Treblinka and Sobibor meant that these camps were shut down earlier than envisioned. Fewer than 150 Jews survived these death camps.

Major extermination camps
Camp	Location	Number of Jews killed	Killing technology	Planning began	Mass gassing duration
Chełmno	Wartheland	150,000	Gas vans	July 1941	8 December 1941–April 1943 and April–July 1944
Belzec	Lublin District	440,823–596,200	Stationary gas chamber, engine exhaust	October 1941	17 March 1942–December 1942
Sobibor	Lublin District	170,618–238,900	Stationary gas chamber, engine exhaust	Late 1941 or March 1942	May 1942–October 1942
Treblinka	Warsaw District	780,863–951,800	Stationary gas chamber, engine exhaust	April 1942	23 July 1942–October 1943
Auschwitz II–Birkenau	East Upper Silesia	900,000–1,000,000	Stationary gas chamber, hydrogen cyanide	September 1941 (built as POW camp)	February 1942–October 1944

=== General Government ===
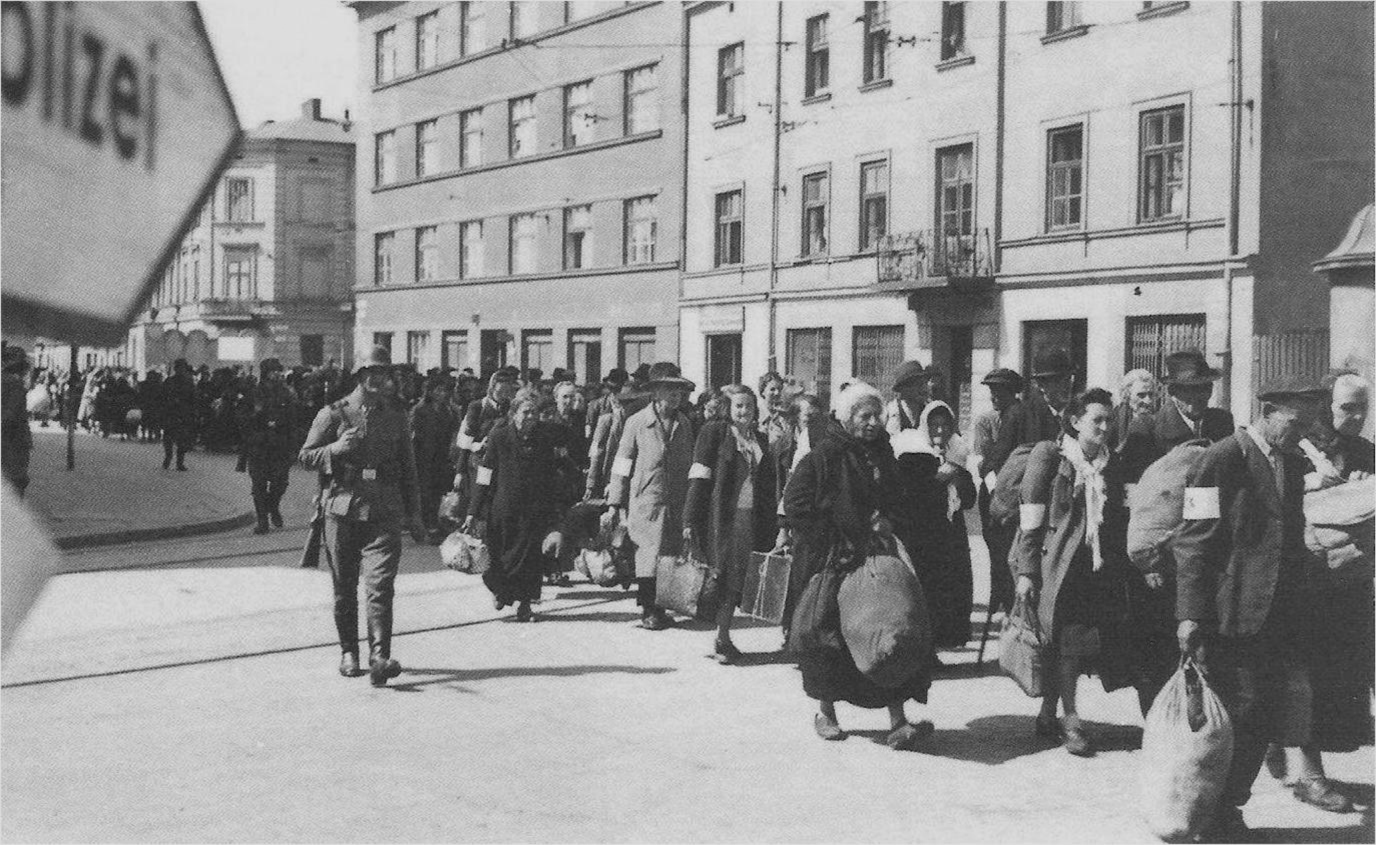
Liquidation of Kraków Ghetto in March 1943 to Auschwitz

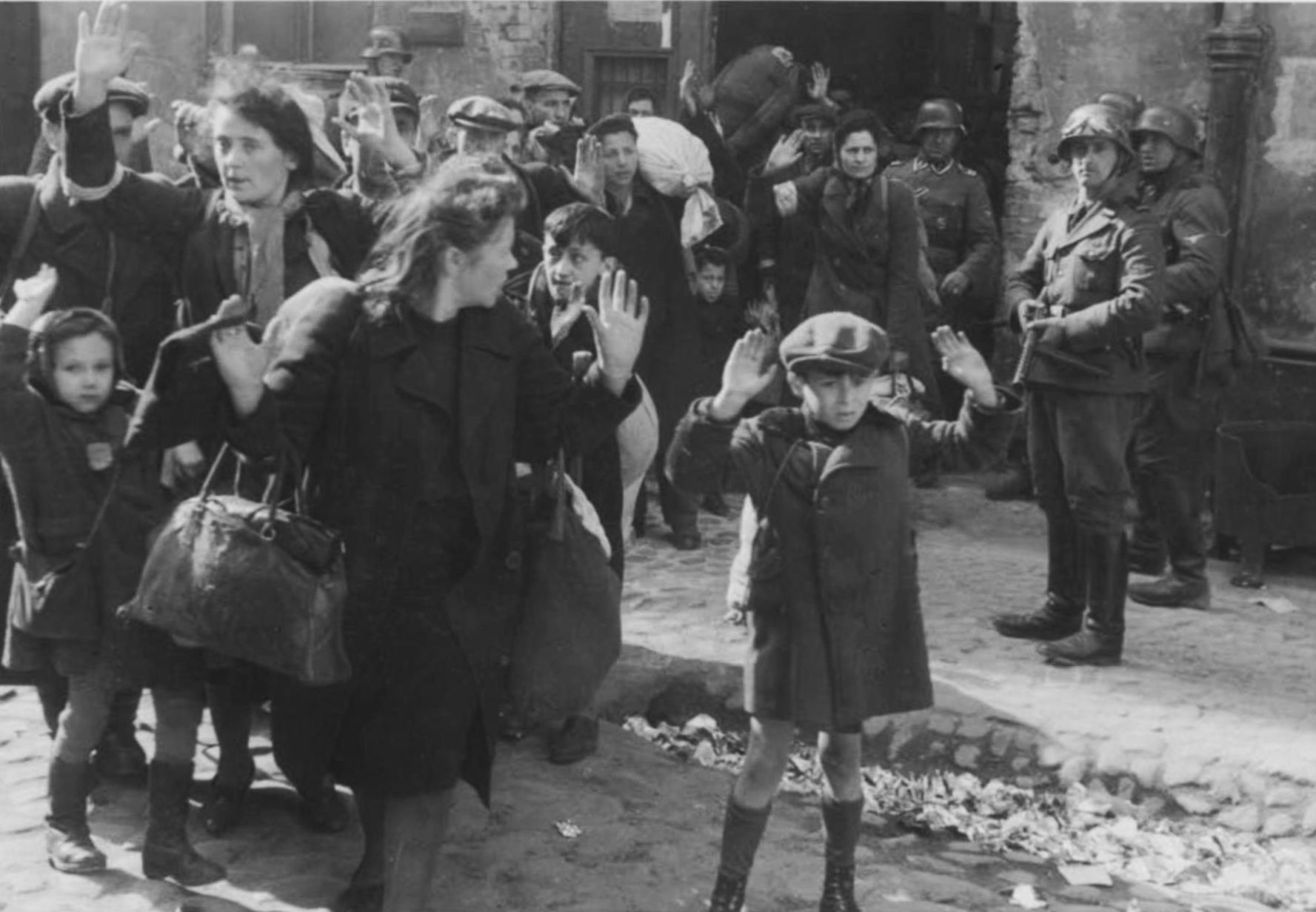
The Warsaw Ghetto Uprising became significant as a symbol of Jewish resistance against the Nazis.

Systematic murder began in the Lublin District in mid-March 1942. The Lublin Ghetto was emptied between 16 March and 20 April; many Jews were shot in the ghetto and 30,000 were deported to Belzec. Most victims from the Lublin District were sent to Sobibor except 2,000 forced laborers imprisoned at Majdanek. The killing was interrupted on 10 June, to resume in August and September. At the same time as these killings, many Jews were deported from Germany and Slovakia to ghettos in the Lublin District that had previously been cleared.

From the end of May and especially since the cessation of deportations in Lublin, thousands of Jews were deported from the Kraków District to Belzec. These transports were halted by a railway moratorium on 19 June.

The Warsaw Ghetto was cleared between 22 July and 12 September. Of the original population of 350,000 Jews, 250,000 were killed at Treblinka, a newly built extermination camp 50 kilometres (30 mi) distant, 11,000 were deported to labor camps, 10,000 were shot in the ghetto, 35,000 were allowed to remain in the ghetto after a final selection, and around 20,000 or 25,000 managed to hide in the ghetto. Misdirection efforts convinced many Jews that they could avoid deportation until it was too late.

During a six-week period beginning in August, 300,000 Jews from the Radom District were sent to Treblinka.

There was practically no Jewish resistance in the General Government in 1942. Ghetto uprisings were only undertaken when the inhabitants began to believe that their death was certain. In 1943, larger uprisings in Warsaw and Białystok necessitated the use of heavy weapons. The uprising in Warsaw prompted the Nazi leadership to liquidate additional ghettos and labor camps in German-occupied Poland with their inhabitants shot or deported to extermination camps for fear of additional Jewish resistance developing. Nevertheless, in early 1944 more than 70,000 Jews were performing forced labor in the General Government.

=== German-annexed areas ===
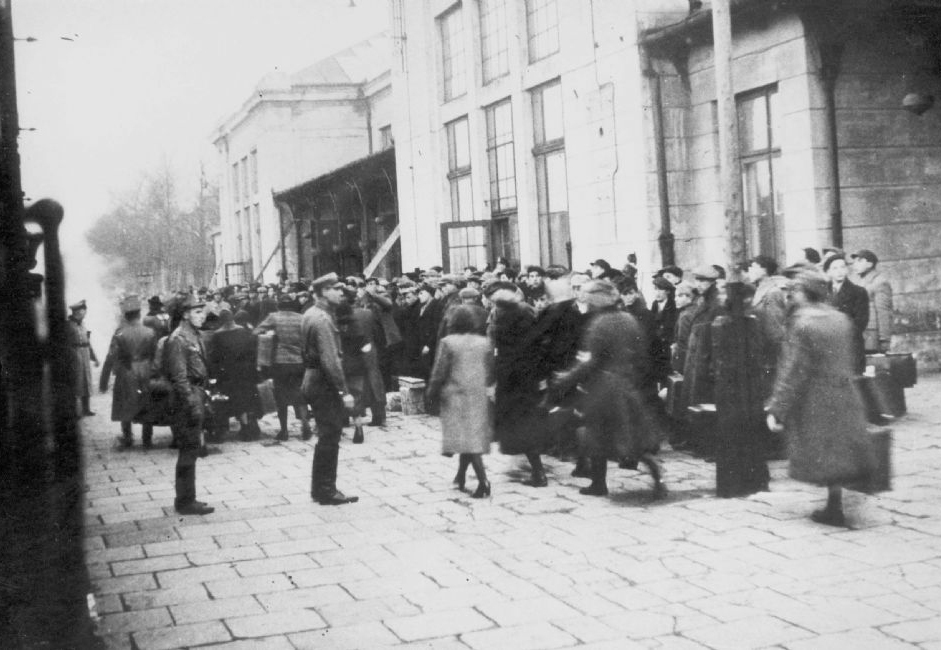
Liquidation of Sosnowiec Ghetto to Auschwitz concentration camp, 1943

Tens of thousands of Jews were deported from ghettos in the Wartheland and East Upper Silesia to Chełmno and Auschwitz.

== Armed resistance and ghetto uprisings ==
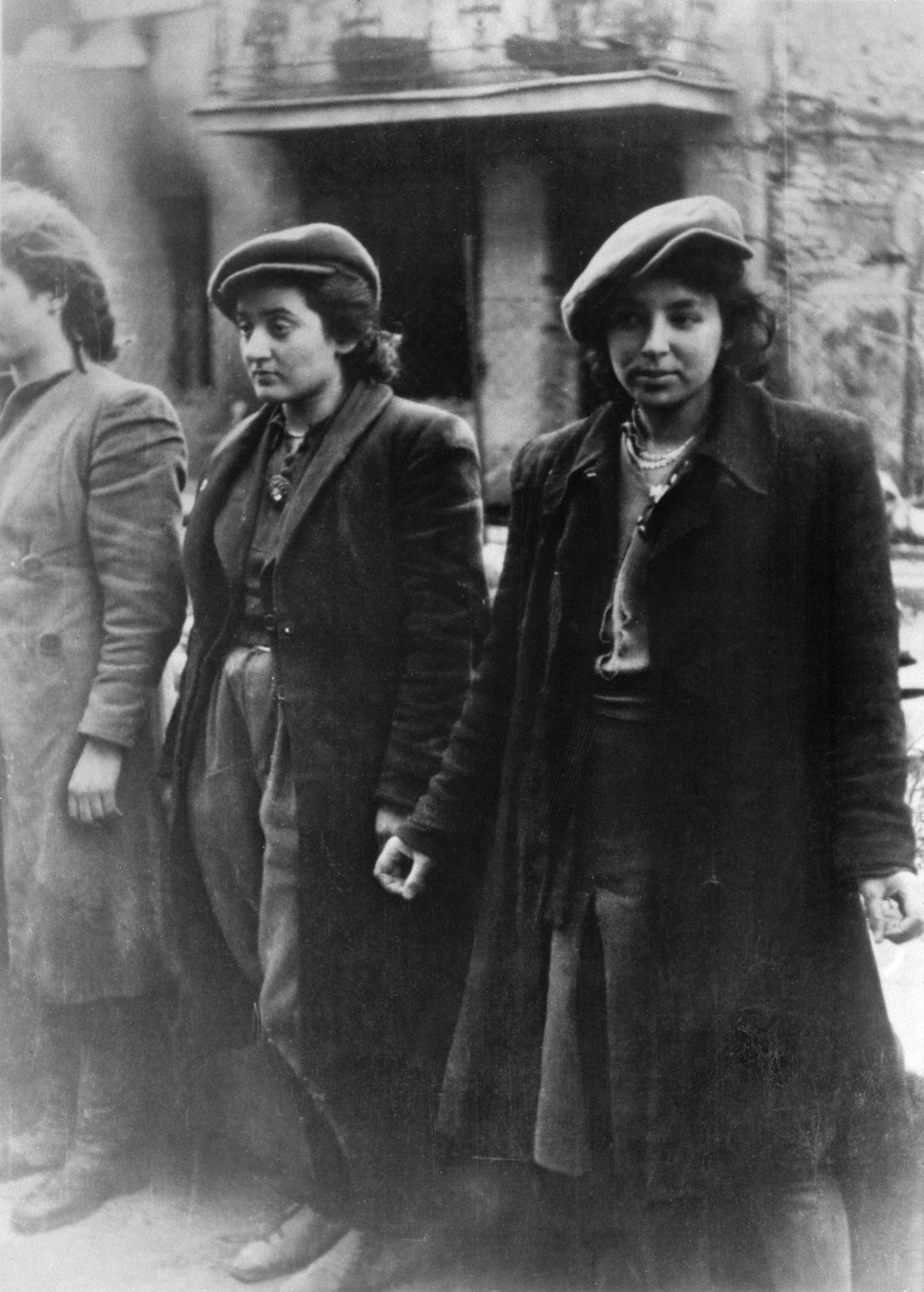
Photograph of Jewish women insurgents captured by the SS during the Warsaw Ghetto Uprising, from the Stroop Report.

Jews resisted the Nazis with not only armed struggle, but also spiritual and cultural opposition that upheld their dignity despite the inhumane conditions of life in the ghettos. Many forms of resistance existed, although the elders feared mass retaliation against women and children in the event of an anti-Nazi revolt. As the German authorities began to liquidate the ghettos, armed resistance was offered in over 100 locations on both sides of Polish-Soviet border of 1939, especially in eastern Poland. Uprisings erupted in five major cities, 45 provincial towns, five major concentration and extermination camps, and at least 18 forced labor camps.

The Nieśwież Ghetto insurgents in eastern Poland fought back on July 22, 1942. The Łachwa Ghetto revolt erupted on September 3. On October 14, 1942, the Mizocz Ghetto followed suit. The Warsaw Ghetto firefight of January 18, 1943, led to the largest Jewish uprising of World War II launched on April 19, 1943. On June 25, the Jews of the Częstochowa Ghetto rose up. At Treblinka, Sonderkommando prisoners armed with stolen weapons attacked the guards on August 2, 1943. A day later, the Będzin and Sosnowiec ghetto revolts broke out. On August 16, the Białystok Ghetto uprising erupted. The revolt in Sobibór extermination camp occurred on October 14, 1943. At Auschwitz-Birkenau, the insurgents blew up one of Birkenau's crematoria on October 7, 1944. Similar resistance was offered in Łuck, Mińsk Mazowiecki, Pińsk, Poniatowa, and in Wilno.

== International response ==
On 26 June 1942, BBC services in all languages publicized a report by the Jewish Social-Democratic Bund and other resistance groups and transmitted by the Polish government-in-exile, documenting the killing of 700,000 Jews in Poland. In December 1942, the United Nations adopted a joint declaration condemning the systematic murder of Jews.

== Escape, hiding and rescue ==
Many Jews attempted to escape death by jumping from trains, but the most of these immediately returned to the ghetto to avoid the risk of being denounced by Poles, which would lead to immediate death. Ability to speak Polish was a key factor in managing to survive, as were financial resources to pay helpers.

The death penalty was threatened for individuals hiding Jews and their families. Each village head was responsible for handing over all Jews and escaped Soviet prisoners of war, partisans, and other strangers to the German occupation authorities under the threat of collective punishment for the village. Although one study found that at least 700 Poles were executed for helping Jews, the death penalty was not always carried out in practice. Rescuers' motivations varied on a spectrum from altruism to expecting sex or money; it was not uncommon for helpers to betray or murder Jews if their money ran out. It was also not uncommon for the same people to help some Jews yet hunting down or kill others.

In September 1942, on the initiative of Zofia Kossak-Szczucka and with financial assistance from the Polish Underground State, a Provisional Committee to Aid Jews (Tymczasowy Komitet Pomocy Żydom) was founded for the purpose of rescuing Jews. It was superseded by the Council for Aid to Jews (Rada Pomocy Żydom), known by the code name Żegota and chaired by Julian Grobelny. It is not known how many Jews, overall, were helped by Żegota; at one point in 1943 it had 2,500 Jewish children under its care in Warsaw alone, under Irena Sendler.

An estimated 30,000 to 60,000 Polish Jews survived in hiding. Some rescuers faced hostility or violence for their actions after the war.

Some Polish peasants participated in German-organized Judenjagd ("Jew hunt") in the countryside, where according to Jan Grabowski, approximately 80% of the Jews who attempted to hide from the Germans ended up being murdered. According to Grabowski, the number of "Judenjagd" victims could reach 200,000 in Poland alone; Szymon Datner gave a lower estimate - 100,000 Jews who "fell prey to the Germans and their local helpers, or were murdered in various unexplained circumstances."

In addition to peasantry and individual collaborators, the German authorities also mobilized the prewar Polish police as what became known as the "Blue Police". Among other duties, Polish policemen were tasked with patrolling for Jewish ghetto escapees, and in support of military operations against the Polish resistance. At its peak in May 1944, the Blue Police numbered some 17,000 men. The Germans also formed the Baudienst ("construction service") in several districts of the General Government. Baudienst servicemen were sometimes deployed in support of aktions (roundup of Jews for deportation or extermination), for example to blockade Jewish quarters or to search Jewish homes for hideaways and valuables.

The Polish right-wing National Armed Forces (Narodowe Siły Zbrojne, or NSZ) – a nationalist, anti-communist organization, widely perceived as anti-Semitic – also collaborated with the Germans on several occasions, killing or giving away Jewish partisans to the German authorities, and murdering Jewish refugees.

Among some 30,000 Ukrainian nationalists who fled to polnischen Gebiete, thousands joined the pokhidny hrupy as saboteurs, interpreters, and civilian militiamen, trained at the German bases across Distrikt Krakau. The genocidal techniques learned from the Germans, such as the advanced planning of the pacification actions, site selection, and sudden encirclement, became the hallmark of the OUN-UPA massacres of Poles in Volhynia and Eastern Galicia beginning in March 1943, and killing of Jews in Western Ukraine, parallel with the liquidation of the ghettos in Reichskommissariat Ostland ordered by Himmler. Thousands of Jews who escaped deportations and hid in the forests were murdered by the Banderites.

The existence of Sonderdienst paramilitary formations of Germans from Poland was a grave danger to those who attempted to help ghettoized Jews in cities with sizable German and pro-German minorities, as in the case of the Izbica, and Mińsk Mazowiecki Ghettos, among many others.

== Death toll ==
Half of all Jewish Holocaust victims, around 3 million, were from Poland. It is estimated that about 350,000 Polish Jews survived the Holocaust. Some 230,000 of them survived in the USSR and the Soviet-controlled territories of Poland, including men and women who escaped from areas occupied by Germany. After World War II, over 150,000 Polish Jews according to Grzegorz Berendt or 180,000 according to David Engel, were repatriated or expelled back to new Poland along with the younger men conscripted to the Red Army from the Kresy in 1940–1941. Their families were murdered in the Holocaust. Gunnar S. Paulsson estimated that 30,000 Polish Jews survived in the labor camps; but according to Engel as many as 70,000–80,000 of them were liberated from camps in Germany and Austria alone, except that declaring their own nationality was of no use to those who did not intend to return. Dariusz Stola found that the most plausible estimates for Jews who survived in hiding were between 30,000 and 60,000.

== Aftermath ==
The German surrender in May 1945 was followed by a massive change in the political geography of Europe. Poland's borders were redrawn by the Allies according to the demands made by Joseph Stalin during the Tehran Conference, confirmed as not negotiable at the Yalta Conference of 1945. The Polish government-in-exile was excluded from the negotiations. The territory of Poland was reduced by approximately 20 percent. Before the end of 1946 some 1.8 million Polish citizens were expelled and forcibly resettled within the new borders. For the first time in its history Poland became a homogeneous one nation-state by force, with the national wealth reduced by 38 percent. Poland's financial system had been destroyed. Intelligentsia was largely obliterated along with the Jews, and the population reduced by about 33 percent.

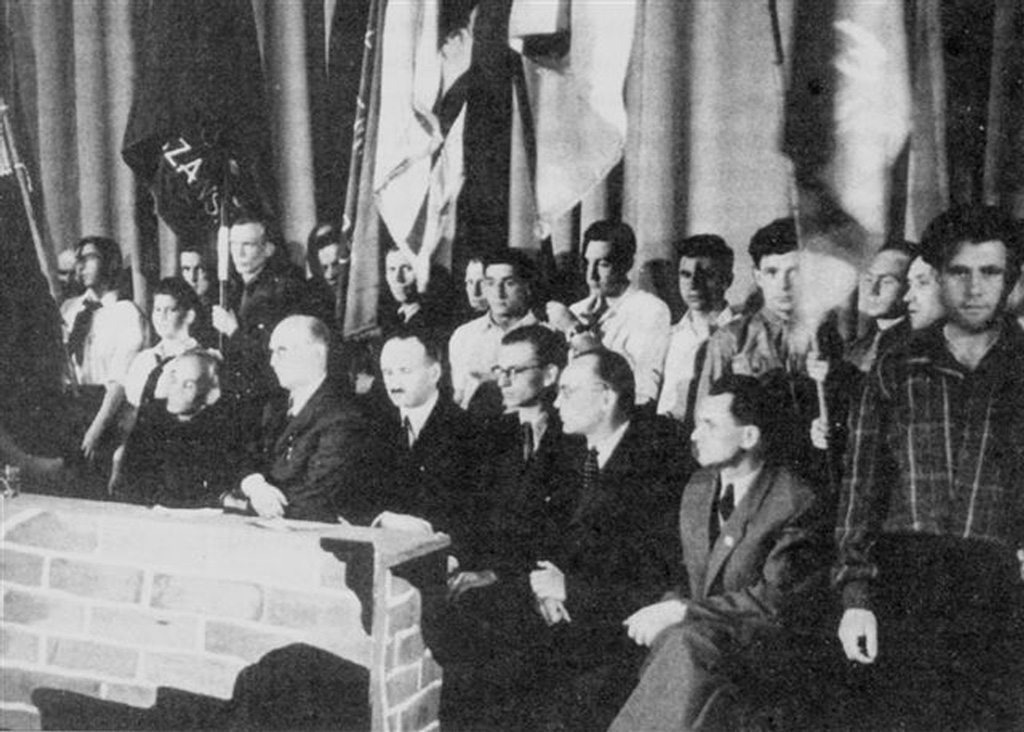
1946 meeting of Żegota members on the anniversary of the Warsaw Ghetto Uprising at the Polish Theatre

Many non-Jews had obtained property or jobs vacated by Jews during the war, and refused to give up these gains to Jewish survivors. The elimination of the Polish aristocracy as well as Polish Jews cleared the way for the foundation of an ethnically Polish middle class. An estimated 650 to 1,200 Jews were killed in Poland after the war. The most notable incident was the Kielce pogrom in July 1946, which cost 42 lives. The Polish state held trials of war criminals under the decree of 31 August 1944. Historian Andrew Kornbluth estimates that "several dozen Poles were executed for denouncing, capturing, and killing their Jewish neighbors during the war", and thousands more perpetrators were investigated or received a lesser sentence.

=== Emigration ===
Many Jews, fearing for their lives, fled to displaced persons camps in Germany. The pogrom prompted General Spychalski of PWP from wartime Warsaw, to sign a legislative decree allowing the remaining survivors to leave Poland without Western visas or Polish exit permits. This also served to strengthen the government's acceptance among the anti-Communist right, as well as weaken the British hold in the Middle East. Most refugees crossing the new borders left Poland without a valid passport. Uninterrupted traffic across the Polish borders increased dramatically. By the spring of 1947 only 90,000 Jews remained in Poland. Britain demanded that Poland (among others) halt the Jewish exodus, but their pressure was largely unsuccessful. Around 13,000 Polish Jews left the country between 1968 and 1972 because of the Communist state antisemitic campaign, as much as one-third of those remaining back then. An apology was made by the democratic Polish government in March 2018. In 2019, the Polish Jewish population was estimated at 4,000, around 0.133% of the pre-1939 population.

== Legacy ==
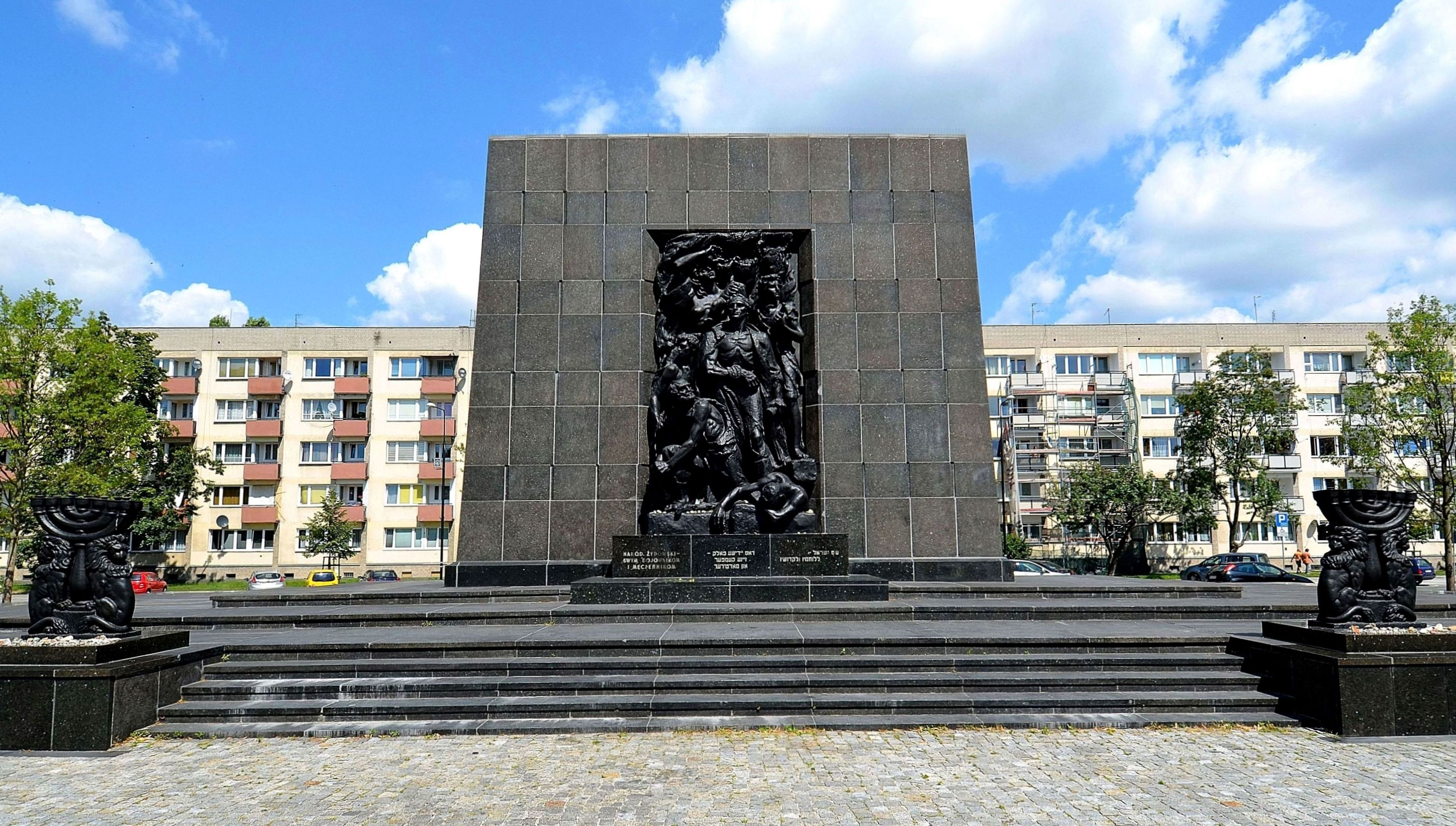
Monument to the Ghetto Heroes in Warsaw, inaugurated in 1948

Although the postwar Jewish community wanted to make Treblinka the main memorial site, the Polish government decided to instead build a memorial at the former Warsaw Ghetto and to focus memorialization efforts at Auschwitz. During the communist era, the differences between different persecuted groups were elided. Memorials were established at Belzec, Sobibor, and Treblinka during the 1960s as a reaction to West German trials, but these camps remain much less well known. The most well-known Holocaust museum in the world is the Auschwitz-Birkenau State Museum which receives about 2 million visitors per year as of 2021. Since 1988, the March of the Living has been held annually at the site of the former camp. The POLIN Museum of the History of Polish Jews opened in 2014 on the site of the former Warsaw Ghetto and is connected with earlier memorials such as the 1948 Monument to the Ghetto Heroes and the memorial at the Umschlagplatz. The phenomenon of Holocaust tourism exploded after 1989 due to reduced travel restrictions and brought along with it increasing tourism and commercialization that sometimes was criticized as kitsch.

In 1999, the Institute of National Remembrance was established in order to promote state-sponsored historical narratives, although the degree to which it is politicized has changed over time. In 2018 the Polish government caused a diplomatic crisis by proposing the Amendment to the Act on the Institute of National Remembrance, that would have prescribed up to three years' imprisonment for someone who "attributes to the Polish Nation or Polish State...co-responsibility for Nazi crimes committed by the Third Reich...or otherwise glaringly minimizes the responsibility of the real perpetrators of these crimes". The law was later revised to a civil penalty.

== Works cited ==
- Bartov, Omer (2023). "The Holocaust". The Oxford History of the Third Reich. Oxford University Press. pp. 190–216. ISBN 978-0-19-288683-5.
- Bazyler, Michael J.; Boyd, Kathryn Lee; Nelson, Kristen L. (2019). Searching for Justice After the Holocaust: Fulfilling the Terezin Declaration and Immovable Property Restitution. Oxford University Press. ISBN 978-0-19-092306-8.
- Beorn, Waitman Wade (2018). The Holocaust in Eastern Europe: At the Epicenter of the Final Solution. Bloomsbury Academic. ISBN 978-1-4742-3219-7.
- Bergen, Doris (2016). War & Genocide: A Concise History of the Holocaust. Rowman & Littlefield. ISBN 978-1-4422-4228-9.
- Burzlaff, Jan (2020). "Confronting the Communal Grave: a Reassessment of Social Relations During the Holocaust in Eastern Europe". The Historical Journal. 63 (4): 1054–1077. doi:10.1017/S0018246X19000566.
- Engel, David (2020). "A Sustained Civilian Struggle: Rethinking Jewish Responses to the Nazi Regime". A Companion to the Holocaust. Wiley. pp. 233–245. ISBN 978-1-118-97052-2.
- Frydel, Tomasz (2018). "Judenjagd: Reassessing the role of ordinary Poles as perpetrators in the Holocaust". Perpetrators and Perpetration of Mass Violence. Routledge. pp. 187–203. ISBN 978-1-351-17586-9.
- Gerlach, Christian (2016). The Extermination of the European Jews. Cambridge University Press. ISBN 978-0-521-70689-6.
- Grzyb, Amanda F. (2020). "The Changing Landscape of Holocaust Memorialization in Poland". A Companion to the Holocaust. Wiley. pp. 619–637. ISBN 978-1-118-97052-2.
- Gruner, Wolf; Osterloh, Jörg (2015). "Introduction". The Greater German Reich and the Jews: Nazi Persecution Policies in the Annexed Territories 1935–1945. War and Genocide. New York: Berghahn Books. pp. 1–12. ISBN 978-1-78238-444-1.
- Hakohen, Devorah (2003). Immigration from Poland. Syracuse University Press, 325 pages. ISBN 978-0-8156-2969-6.
- Hilberg, Raul (2003). The Destruction of the European Jews.
- Kay, Alex J. (2021). Empire of Destruction: A History of Nazi Mass Killing. Yale University Press. ISBN 978-0-300-26253-7.
- Kliymuk, Alexander (2018). "The Construct Ostjuden in German Anti-Semitic Discourse of 1920–1932". Scripta Judaica Cracoviensia. 16.
- Kopstein, Jeffrey S.; Wittenberg, Jason (2018). Intimate Violence: Anti-Jewish Pogroms on the Eve of the Holocaust. Cornell University Press. ISBN 978-1-5017-1527-3.
- Kopstein, Jeffrey S. (2023). "A Common History of Violence?: The Pogroms of Summer 1941 in Comparative Perspective". Politics, Violence, Memory: The New Social Science of the Holocaust. Cornell University Press. pp. 104–123. ISBN 978-1-5017-6676-3.
- Kornbluth, Andrew (2021). The August Trials: The Holocaust and Postwar Justice in Poland. Harvard University Press. ISBN 978-0-674-25988-1.
- Láníček, Jan (2012). "Governments-in-exile and the Jews during and after the Second World War". Holocaust Studies. 18 (2–3): 73–94. doi:10.1080/17504902.2012.11087307.
- Lehnstaedt, Stephan (2021). "Aktion Reinhardt – Sources, Research and Commemoration in the last 30 years". Témoigner. Entre histoire et mémoire. Revue pluridisciplinaire de la Fondation Auschwitz (132): 62–70. doi:10.4000/temoigner.9886. ISSN 2031-4183. S2CID 256347577.
- Longerich, Peter (2010). Holocaust: The Nazi Persecution and Murder of the Jews. Oxford University Press. ISBN 978-0-19-280436-5.
- Lukas, Richard C. (1989). Out of the Inferno: Poles Remember the Holocaust. University Press of Kentucky. p. 13. ISBN 978-0-8131-1692-1. "The estimates of Jewish survivors in Poland."
- Lukas, Richard C. (2001). The forgotten Holocaust: the Poles under German occupation, 1939–1944. Hippocrene Books. ISBN 978-0-7818-0901-6.
- Miron, Guy (2020). "Ghettos and Ghettoization – History and Historiography". A Companion to the Holocaust. Wiley. pp. 247–261. ISBN 978-1-118-97052-2.
- Stone, Dan (2010). Histories of the Holocaust. Oxford University Press. ISBN 978-0-19-956679-2.

Snyder, Timothy (2010). Bloodlands. Europe between Hitler and Stalin. Bodley Head. ISBN 9780224081412.

- Zimmerman, Joshua D. (2015). The Polish Underground and the Jews, 1939–1945. Cambridge University Press. ISBN 978-1-316-29825-1.
- Żbikowski, Andrzej (2008). "Polscy Żydzi w latach drugiej wojny światowej" [Polish Jews in the years of the Second World War]. Wysiedlenia, wypędzenia i ucieczki 1939-1959. Atlas ziem Polski [Displacements, expulsions and escapes 1939-1959. Atlas of the lands of Poland]. Warsaw.
