= General Government administration =

Administration of Occupied Poland during WWII

Proposed flag information
- Proposed flag for the General Government.

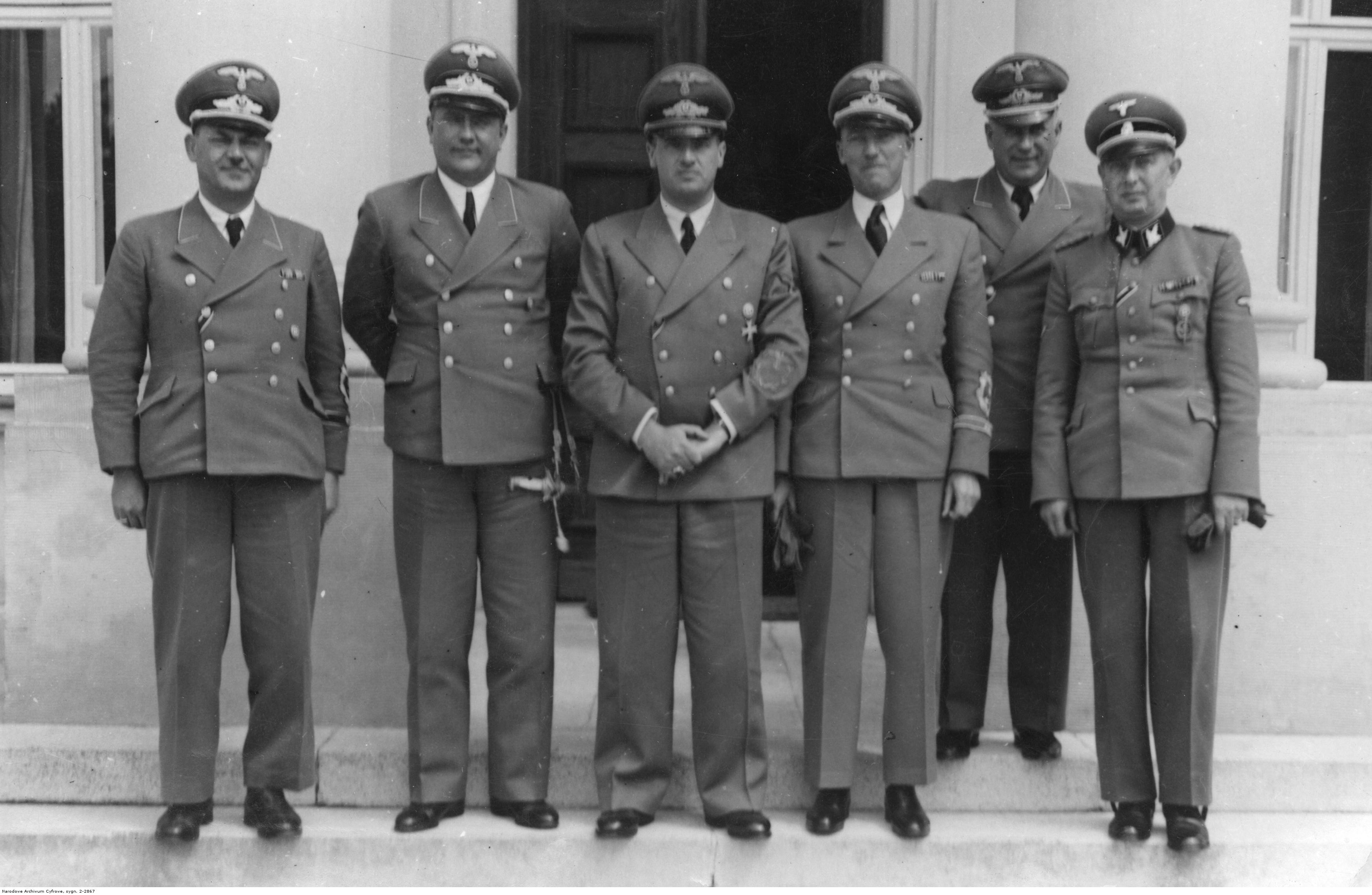
Hans Frank with district administrators in 1942 from left: Ernst Kundt, Ludwig Fischer, Hans Frank, Otto Wächter, Ernst Zörner, Richard Wendler.

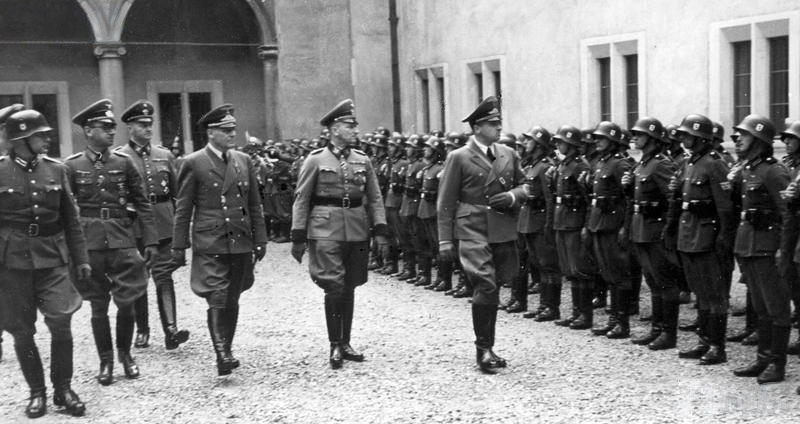
Leaders of the General Government during an inspection of the Sonderdienst: from right, marching, Generalgouverneur Hans Frank, Chief of the Police GG Herbert Becker and secretary of state Ernst Boepple

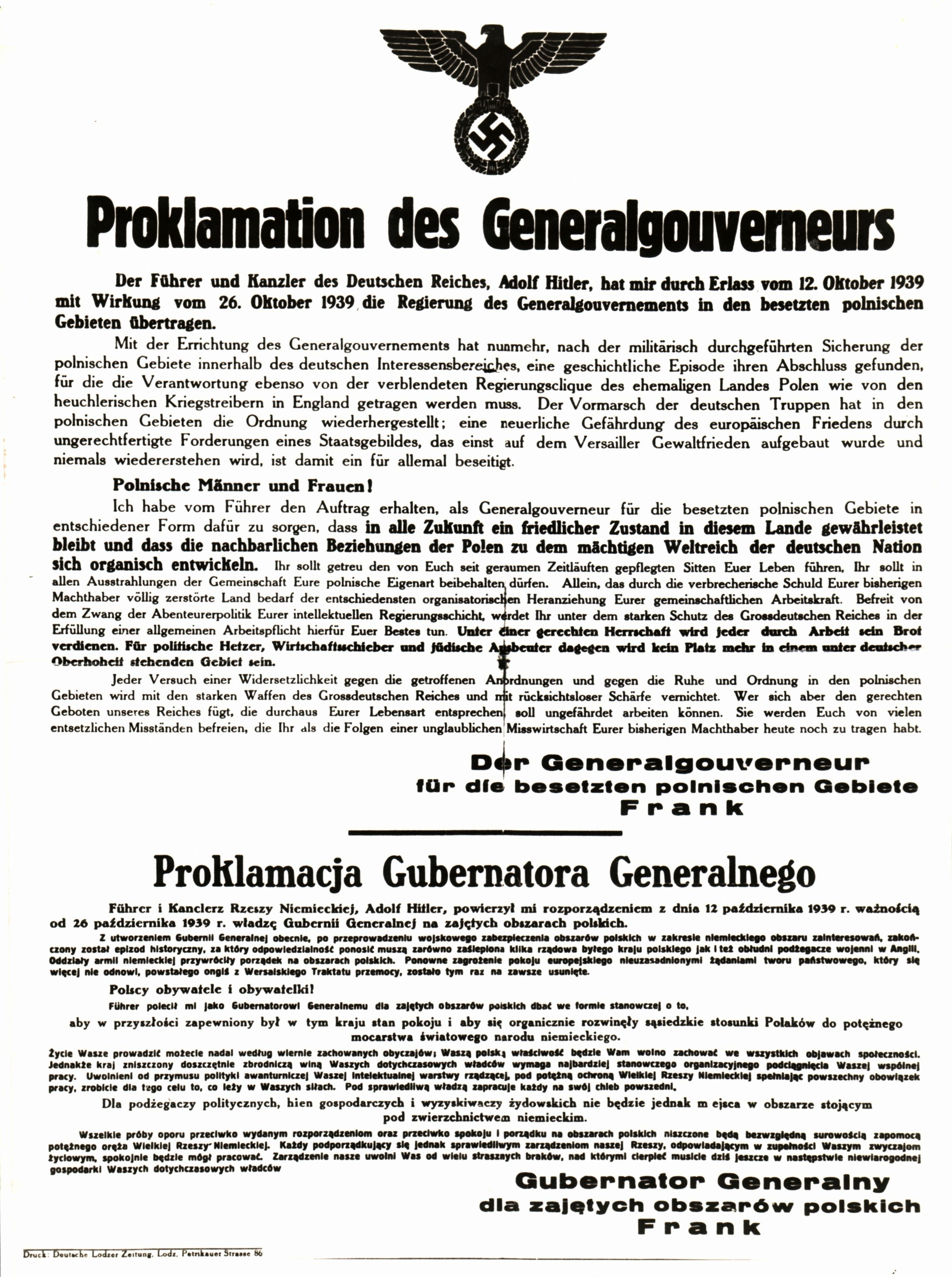
Official proclamation of the General-Government in Poland by Germany, October 1939

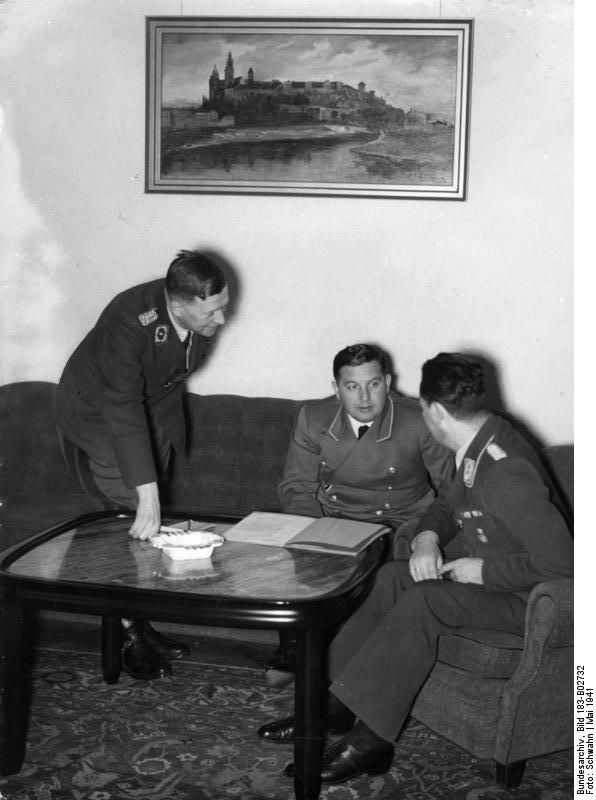
Members of General Gouvernment administration: in center Chief of the Government Josef Bühler, Kurt Eissfeldt and at right Ernst Kundt.

The General Government administration (German: Generalgouvernement für die besetzten polnischen Gebiete, lit. 'General Government for the occupied Polish areas'), a government and administration of the General Government set up on part of that area of the Second Republic of Poland under Nazi German rule, operated during World War II between 1939 and early 1945.

The Third Reich formed the General Government in October 1939 in the wake of the German and Soviet claim that the Polish state had totally collapsed following the invasion of Poland in September–October 1939. The German Wehrmacht had attacked Poland with strong air-power and with massive numbers of troops and tanks on 1 September 1939. The Germans' initial intent was to clear the western part of Poland, the Reichsgau Wartheland, and to bring it into the "Greater German Reich". However, those plans quickly stalled. On 23 August 1939, German foreign-minister Joachim von Ribbentrop and his Soviet counterpart had agreed to a non-aggression pact and had demarcated their respective countries' "spheres of influence" in Poland.

== Background ==
"No government protectorate is anticipated for Poland, but a complete German administration. (...) Leadership layer of the population in Poland should be as far as possible, disposed of. The other lower layers of the population will receive no special schools, but are to be oppressed in some form". - The excerpts of the minute of the first conference of heads of the main police officers and commanders of operational groups led by Heydrich's deputy, SS-Brigadefuhrer Dr. Werner Best, Berlin 7 September 1939.

After the invasion of Poland the first German administration on occupied Polish areas was established by the German military Wehrmacht. Subordinated to them was a civilian "Chief of Civil Administration" (Chefs der Zivilverwaltung, CdZ), Dr. Hans Frank. As of late September 1939, most Polish territory was in German hands. The other parts of Poland were controlled by either the USSR or Lithuania, with Lithuania controlling barely 2% of the area. The Reich Interior Ministry drafted two bills on 8 October 1939 – one for the incorporation of western and northern Poland into the Reich, the other for the creation of a General Government in the remaining German-held territory. The General Government was located in the center of Poland, covering about a third of the country's former territory and including about 45% of its population. The General Government creation was prompted by the ending of military actions in the autumn of 1939. On 12 October 1939, a decree by Hitler established the General Government administered by a General Governor (German: Generalgouverneur) overseeing the Office of the General Governor (Amt des Generalgouverneurs), which was renamed the Government of the General Government (Regierung des Generalgouvernements) on 9 December 1940. The General Governor was Frank and his Deputy General Governor was Arthur Seyss-Inquart. The General Governor's Office (later, Government) was headed by Josef Bühler, who was elevated to State Secretary in March 1940. After Seyss-Inquart left to become Reichskommissar of Reichskommissariat Niederlande in May 1940, State Secretary Bühler functioned as Frank's deputy.

Several other individuals had powers to issue legislative decrees in addition to the General Governor, most notably the Higher SS and Police Leader of the General Government (Friedrich-Wilhelm Krüger, later Wilhelm Koppe). All members of the first office:

- 1. Hans Frank - General Governor
  - Frank was the president of the Academy for German Law and, as General Governor, he was subordinate only to Hitler.
- 2. Josef Bühler - State Secretary,
- 3. Friedrich-Wilhelm Krüger - Higher SS and Police Leader,
- 4. Otto von Wächter - Governor of the Kraków District,
- 5. Friedrich Schmidt - Governor of the Lublin District,
- 6. Karl Lasch - Governor of the Radom District,
- 7. Ludwig Fischer - Governor of the Warsaw District,
- 8. Wilhelm Heuber - Plenipotentiary of the General Governor (Bevollmächtigter des Generalgouverneurs) in Berlin.

== Status ==
The General Government had no international recognition. The territories it administered were never either in whole or part intended as any future Polish state. According to the Nazi government the Polish state had ceased to exist, in spite of the existence of a Polish government-in-exile. It was not a puppet state but simply a Nazi- administered region. It was emphatically not a Polish puppet government, as there were no Polish representatives above the local administration.

== Administrative division ==
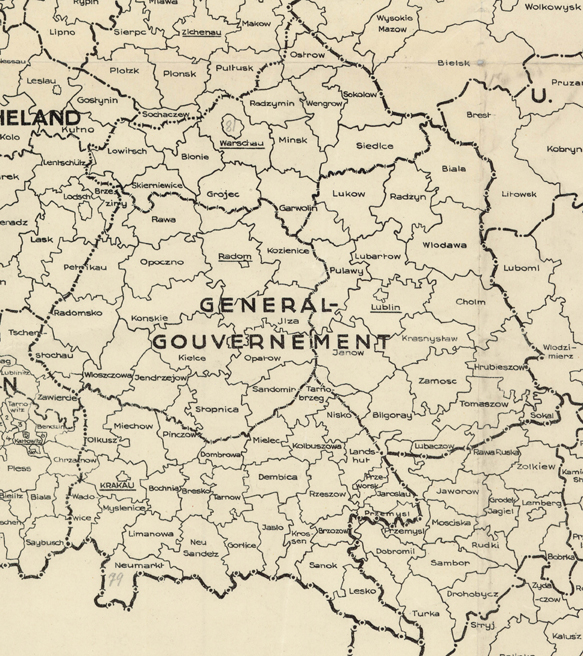
Administrative division of the General Government (German: Generalgouvernement) in 1940.

The General Government was divided into four districts initially: Krakow, Radom, Warsaw and Lublin. Each of these districts was headed by a governor (originally district chief) who were directly responsible to Frank. In 1941, after the outbreak of Russian and German hostilities, the district of Galicia was added as the fifth district.

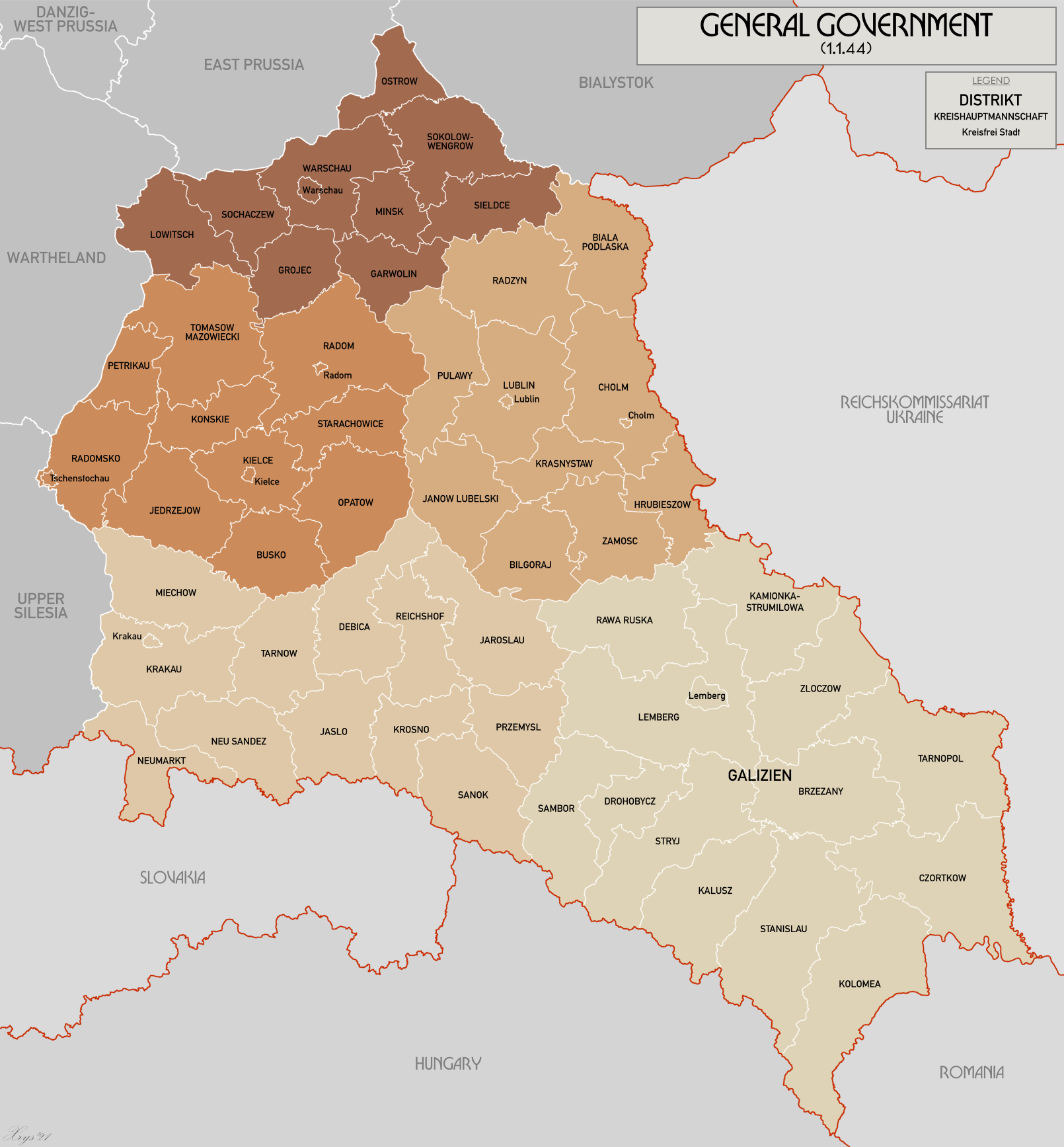
Map of the administrative areas of the General Government.

The 5 districts in the General Government include:

- 1. Kraków District, led by SS-Brigadeführer Dr Otto von Wächter (between 26 October 1939 to 22 August 1942) and SS-Brigadeführer Dr Richard Wendler from 31 August 1942 to 26 May 1943
- 2. Lublin District, led by Friedrich Schmidt (from 1939 to March 1940), Ernst Zörner (from 31 March 1940 to 10 April 1943) and Richard Wendler (from 27 Mai 1943 to July 1944)
- 3. Radom District, led by Karl Lasch from 26 October 1939 to July 1941 and Ernst Kundt from September 1941 to 16 August 1945,
- 4. Warsaw District, led by Ludwig Fischer from 26 October 1939 to 17 August 1945,
- 5. Galicia District (from 1 September 1941), led by dr Karl Lasch from 1 September 1941 to 6 August 1942 and SS-Gruppenführer Otto von Wächter from 1 February 1942 to July 1944.

The districts were divided into sub-districts, known as Kreise, each headed by a Kreishauptmann. Stadtkreise were the city districts, then below that were the Kreishauptmannschaften, which was the county level. The General Government's six largest cities – Warsaw, Krakow, Czestochowa, Lublin, Radom and Kielce were governed by Stadthauptmänner. Kreis- and Stadthauptmänner had wide-ranging responsibilities over political and economic life within their area. However, authority at any level was solely in the hands of the Governor General or Hans Frank. In order to avoid competing jurisdiction, which what the government in the Reich was like, each administrative chief was to ensure the individual departments were subordinated to his authority. Frank had also modeled his departments based on the Reich, therefore Berlin saw them as subordinates. There was to be no interferences by any agencies in Berlin. There were eleven plenipotentiaries of various Reich ministries in the GG but also one plenipotentiary or “ambassador” of the GG in the Reich. The bureaucracy of each district consisted of ten departments.

At the end of 1941 when Galicia was incorporated as the fifth district, there were fifty-six county leaders and seven city leaders distributed throughout.

District	County Leaders	City Leaders
Krakow	12	1
Lublin	10	1
Radom	10	1
Warsaw	9	3
Galicia	15	1

Central and district administrative offices were staffed and controlled by Germans, however Russians and Ukrainians were placed in many less important positions. Also, Poles were employed in autonomous institutions such as management of municipalities, municipal enterprises and public utilities. Decrees and regulatory announcements pertaining to the GG were published in an official bulletin. Similar bulletins were published for each district.

== Organization of Government ==
The government seat of the General Government was located in Kraków (German: Krakau) rather than the traditional Polish capital Warsaw for security reasons. The official state language was German, although Polish continued to be used to a large degree as well, especially on the local levels. Several institutions of the old Polish state were retained in some form for ease of administration. The Polish police, with no high-ranking Polish officers (who were arrested or demoted), was renamed the Blue Police and became subordinated to the Ordnungspolizei. The Polish educational system was similarly kept, but most higher institutions were closed. The Polish local administration was kept, subordinated to new German bosses. The Polish financial system, including the zloty currency, was kept, but with revenues now going to the German state. A new bank was created, and was issuing new banknotes.

The General Government was modeled based on the Reich, with 12 departments (Hauptabteilungen), which would later become 14, responsible for areas such as finance, justice and labour along with a Secretariat of State with several offices. However, the offices of the State Secretariat were not created until March 1941.

The Government of the General Government 12 departments:

- I Hauptabteilung Innere Verwaltung - Department of Interior, led from October 1939 - September 1940 Friedrich Siebert, between September 1940 - November 1940 Ernst Kundt, November 1940 - January 1942 Eberhard Westerkamp, from February 1942 to January 1943 Ludwig Siebert, January 1943 - October 1943 Ludwig Losacker and between November 1943 - 1945 Harry Georg von Crausshaar,
- II Hauptabteilung Finanzen - Department of Finance, led between March 1940 - January 1942 Alfred Spindler and from January 1942 - Generalgouvernement in Polen in den Kriegsjahren 1939–45, von Towiah Friedman, Verlag Institute of Documentation in Israel, 2002.
- III Hauptabteilung Justiz - Department of Justice led from Mai 1942 to 1945 by Kurt Wille
- IV Hauptabteilung Wirtschaft - Department of Economy, led by Richard Zetsche and Walter Emmerich,
- V Hauptabteilung Ernahrung und Landwirtschaft - Department of Food and Agriculture,
- VI Hauptabteilung Forsten - Department of Forests, October 1939 - 1945 Kurt Eissfeldt,
- VII Hauptabteilung Arbeit - Department of Labour, led by between November 1939 - November 1942 Max Frauendorf, from November 1942 to August 1943 Alexander Rhetz and between August 1943 - 1945 Wilhelm Struve,
- VIII Hauptabteilung Propaganda - Department of Propaganda, led by Max du Prel.
- IX Hauptabteilung Wissenshaft und Unterricht - Department of Science and Education,
- X Hauptabteilung Bauwesen - Department of Building from August 1940 to 1945 led by Theodor Bauder,
- XI Hauptabteilung Eisenbahn - Department of Railways, led from October 1939 to December 1942 Hellmut Körner, from December 1942 - 1945 Karl Naumann,
- XII Hauptabteilung Post - Department of Post led by Richard Lauxmann

On all territorial levels, whether it was the district (Distrikt), city (Stadt) or county (Kreis), authority was concentrated in the hands of one person. This idea of Führerprinzip was adopted, meaning all authority was concentrated in the hands of one man, the head of the administration at the given territorial level. Although this principle of Führerprinzip was supposed to unify the administration, it had effects on policy implementation. In each district, functionaries responsible for all branches of the administration were fully subordinate to a Kreishauptman or a Governor. Local leaders had to agree before any lower level wanted to move forward with a plan.

Frank also established the GG administration to be run under the guiding principle of “unity of administration.” (Einheit der Verwaltung)The idea was the centralization of all administrative agencies designated as main divisions under the direction of Buehler. Once a policy from one of the four districts was approved by Frank and Buehler, it went from the seat of the General Governor in Krakow to the district chief in charge of all administration within the designated area. The district chief also authorized implementation through the district administrative division. The town or rural chief (Stadthauptman and Kreishauptman) received orders from the district chief and passed them to the local administrative offices. Although “unity of administration” was the goal, there were frequent disputes found anywhere from between departments in Krakow, between the central administration and districts or between governors and Kreshaputleute.

== Administrative Differences ==
Unlike the territories incorporated into the Reich, the Generalgouvernement had a different administrative structure. All branches of the administration were to be directed by the Governor General rather than by parallel Reich ministries from Berlin. No interferences by the reich was the goal. Polish law was to remain in place unless it diverged from the taking over of the administration by the German Reich. The territories incorporated into the Reich were administratively modeled after the Reich itself. The difference between the incorporated territories and the general government was the degree of centralization of bureaucracy. Generalgouverneur Hans Frank took orders from Adolf Hitler and then forwarded it down to the Hauptabteilung. This system skips the ministerial offices that the incorporated areas followed. Furthermore, Frank had more authority than the Reichsstatthalter or an Oberpräsident. The regional network of the general government administration closely resembled the Reich, apart from some various differences in titles. For example, Gouveneur was originally called Distriktchef, but the title was changed to boost moral.

There were three key administrative assets the General Government did not control. The Generalgouvernement was separated from the Reich by customs laws, financial barriers and passport control, but did not have its own armed forces or foreign ministry. The GG's budget had to be approved by the Reich Finance Ministry. Generalgouverneurur Frank had no command over the army, troops, and war production. The power over the army, troops and war productions was held exclusively by a general. The power of the army went as following: Oberbefehlshaber Ost (Gernaloberest Blaskowitz), Militarbefehlshaber im Gerneralgouvernement (General der Kavallerie Kurt Freiherr von Gienanth), and Wehrkreisbefehlshaber im Generalgouvernement (Gienanth and General derer Infanterie Haenicke). The war production was in the hands of the Rustungsinspektion, or Armament Inspectorate (Gerneralleutnant Schindler).

Frank and the administration also had no command over the railway system or the post. However, Frank did have a Main Division Railway under the direction of Präsident Gerteis, who was also the Generalddirektor of the Ostbahn, which was run by the Reichbhn. It was the Ostbahn who operated the former Polish State Railways in the Generalgouvernment.

The third exception was the SS and police. From the beginning of the GG, the position of the police and SS was not clearly defined which created some conflict between the groups. The police enjoyed a special status due to the fact of how important security was in the occupied territory. Frank and his administration did not control those entities as they fell under the jurisdiction of Heinrich Himmler.

== Top officials ==
On 8 October 1939, the Reich Interior Ministry drafted two bills, one to incorporate the western and northern portions of Poland into the German Reich, and the other for the creation of a 'General Government' in the remaining German-held territory. The German Governor-General and the deputy of that office were the officers that held executive power in the territory.

=== General Governor ===
Portrait	Name (Birth–Death)	Term of office			Political party
Portrait	Name (Birth–Death)	Took office	Left office	Time in office	Political party
	Hans Frank (1900–1946) (aged 46)	26 October 1939	19 January 1945	5 years, 85 days	Nazi Party

=== Deputy General Governor ===
Portrait	Name (Birth–Death)	Term of office			Political party
Portrait	Name (Birth–Death)	Took office	Left office	Time in office	Political party
	Arthur Seyss-Inquart (1892–1946) (aged 54)	26 October 1939	18 May 1940	219 days	Nazi Party
	Josef Bühler (as State Secretary) (1904-1948) (aged 44)	18 May 1940	19 January 1945	4 years, 246 days	Nazi Party

== Police Officials in the General Government ==
Key police officials (in succession) in the generalgouvernement:

BdO (Commander of Order Police): Becker, Riege, Winkler, Becker, Günwald, Höring

BdS (Commander of Security Police and Security Service): Streckenbach, Schöngarth, Bierkamp

The SS and Police organization was centralized at both the Generalgouverneur level and under the Gouverneure.

In succession, the five SS and Police leaders were:

Kraków: Zech, Schwedler, Scherner, Thier

Lublin: Globocnik, Sporrenberg

Radom: Katzmann, Oberg, Böttcher

Warsaw: Moder, Wigand, von Sammern, Stroop, Kutschera, Geibel

Galicia: Oberg, Katzmann, Diehm

== Inner Conflict and Quality of Administration ==
There was some conflict in the understanding of the power structure within the General Government, particularly with Frank. He saw himself as the "supreme territorial chief" and more powerful than SS and Police Leader Friedrich-Wilhelm Krüger. Frank appointed Krüger as his Staatssekretär for Security, meaning Krüger would take orders from Frank. Himmler was not thrilled by these decisions, as both men were hungry for power. This conflict would be taken out on the Jews.

The quality of German personnel in the GG administration was low, albeit with exceptions. Better-qualified people were to be sent West and “strong personalities” or fanatic Nazis, as stated by Hitler, were to be sent to the East. Frank knew many of his subordinates were not well-qualified, often complaining about the lack of middle-level civil servants. Corruption was present everywhere in the administration. For example, the governor of the Radom district, Dr. Lasch, died in prison after being arrested for corruption and sentenced to death. The GG was a dumping ground not just for the Nazis' racial undesirables, but also for its unwanted officials. With high turnover already a problem, the tendency of better officials to work for the central administration in Krakow created further difficulties. (1 pg. 50)

== Collaborators ==
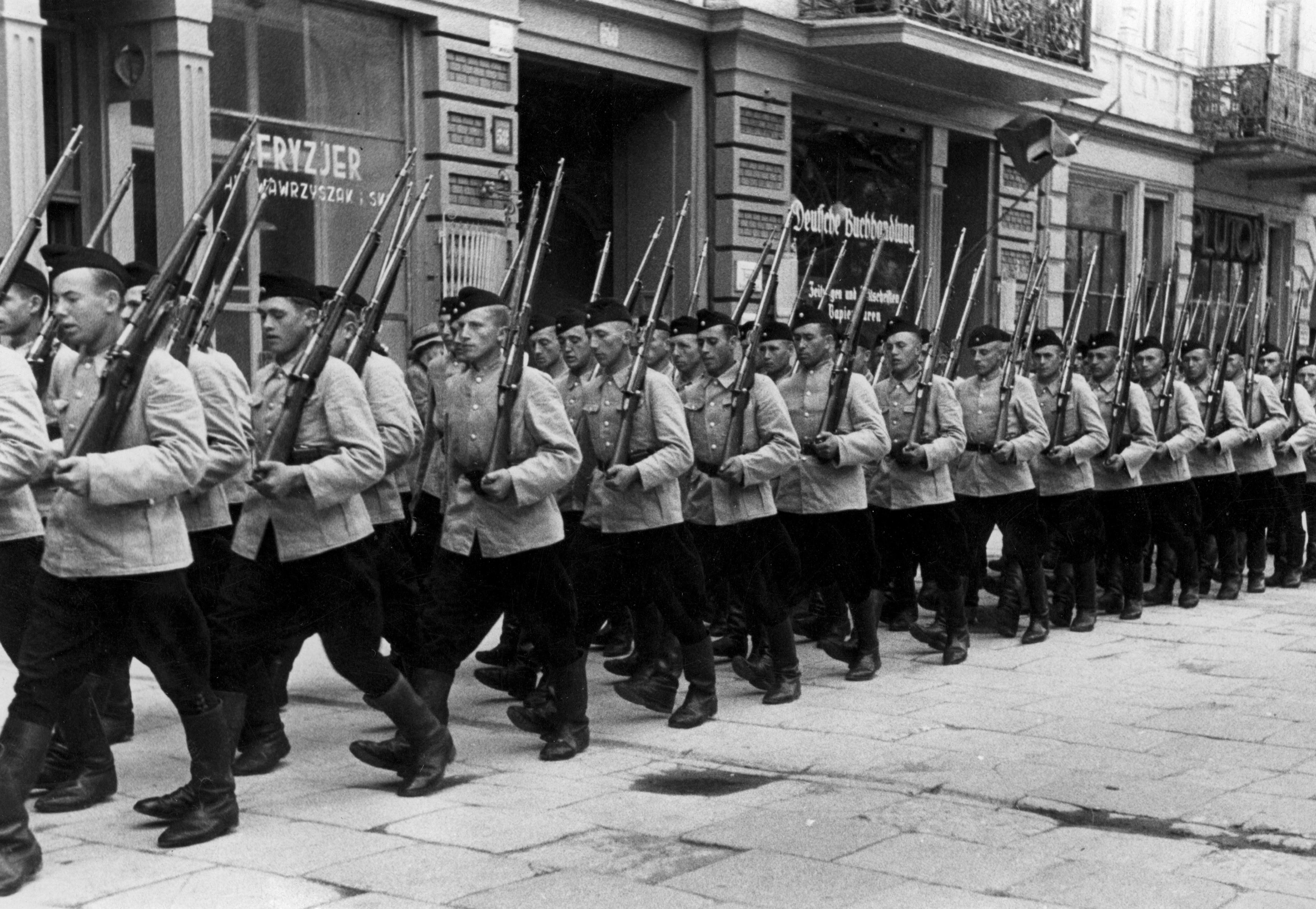
Sonderdienst battalion in occupied Kraków, July 1940

The Germans sought to play Ukrainians and Poles off against each other. Within ethnic Ukrainian areas annexed by Germany, beginning in October 1939, Ukrainian Committees were established with the purpose of representing the Ukrainian community to the German authorities and assisting the approximately 30,000 Ukrainian refugees who fled from Soviet-controlled territories. These committees also undertook cultural and economic activities that had been banned by the previous Polish government. Schools, choirs, reading societies and theaters were opened, and twenty Ukrainian churches that had been closed by the Polish government were reopened. A Ukrainian publishing house was created in Cracow, which, despite having to struggle with German censors and paper shortages was able to publish school textbooks, classics of Ukrainian literature, and the works of dissident Ukrainian writers from the Soviet Union. By March 1941 there were 808 Ukrainian educational societies with 46,000 members. Ukrainian organizations within the General Government were able to negotiate the release of 85,000 Ukrainian prisoners of war from the German-Polish conflict (although they were unable to help Soviet POWs of Ukrainian ethnicity).

After the war, the Polish Supreme National Tribunal declared that the government of the General Government was a criminal institution.

== Decrees issued for the Jews in the Generalgouvernement ==
These issues were declared by General-Gouverneur Hans Frank for the Jews in the Generalgouvernement.

- On October 26, 1939, there was declaration related to forced labor for Jewish residents under the General Gouvernement.
- On November 23, 1939, it was declared that Jews over the age of 10 must wear a white band, at least 10 centimeters wide, with the star of David on the right sleeve of their inner and outer clothing beginning December 1, 1939. Furthermore, the Jews had to come up with the means to produce the band.
- On November 28, 1939, there was the establishment of Jewish councils.
- On October 15, 1941, residence and travel of Jews was restricted. Any Jew who left their district without authorization could be punished by death. Furthermore, the hiding of Jews would also result in death.

== See also ==
- Administrative division of Polish territories during World War II
- Postal communication in the General Government

== Bibliography ==
- Klee, Ernst (2007). Das Personenlexikon zum Dritten Reich. Wer war was vor und nach 1945. Frankfurt-am-Main: Fischer-Taschenbuch-Verlag. ISBN 978-3-596-16048-8.
- Berenstein Tatiana, Rutkowski Adam: Niemiecka administracja wojskowa na okupowanych ziemiach polskich (1 września — 25 października 1939 r.). in: Najnowsze Dziejke Polski. Materiały i studia z okresu II wojny światowej. Bd. VI. Warszawa 1962. S. 45–57
- Bogdan Musial: Deutsche Zivilverwaltung und Judenverfolgung im Generalgouvernement. Harrassowitz, Wiesbaden 1999, ISBN 3-447-04208-7; 2. unv. Aufl., ebd. 2004, ISBN 3-447-05063-2.
- Das Generalgouvernement. Reisehandbuch. Karl Baedeker Verlag, Leipzig 1943 – drei Datierungen der Übersichtskarte: IV.43, VI.43, undatiert.
- Max du Prel (Hrsg.): Das Generalgouvernement. Konrad Triltsch, Würzburg 1942.
- Werner Präg/Wolfgang Jacobmeyer (Hrsg.): Das Diensttagebuch des deutschen Generalgouverneurs in Polen 1939–1945 (= Quellen und Darstellungen zur Zeitgeschichte. Bd. 20). Deutsche Verlags-Anstalt, Stuttgart 1975, ISBN 3-421-01700-X (Veröffentlichung des Instituts für Zeitgeschichte).
