= The August Trials =

The August Trials: The Holocaust and Postwar Justice in Poland
- Author: Andrew Kornbluth
- Language: English
- Publisher: Harvard University Press
- Publication date: 2021

The August Trials: The Holocaust and Postwar Justice in Poland is a book by Andrew Kornbluth, published in 2021 by Harvard University Press.
