= Captured Hehalutz fighters photograph =

Warsaw Ghetto Uprising photograph

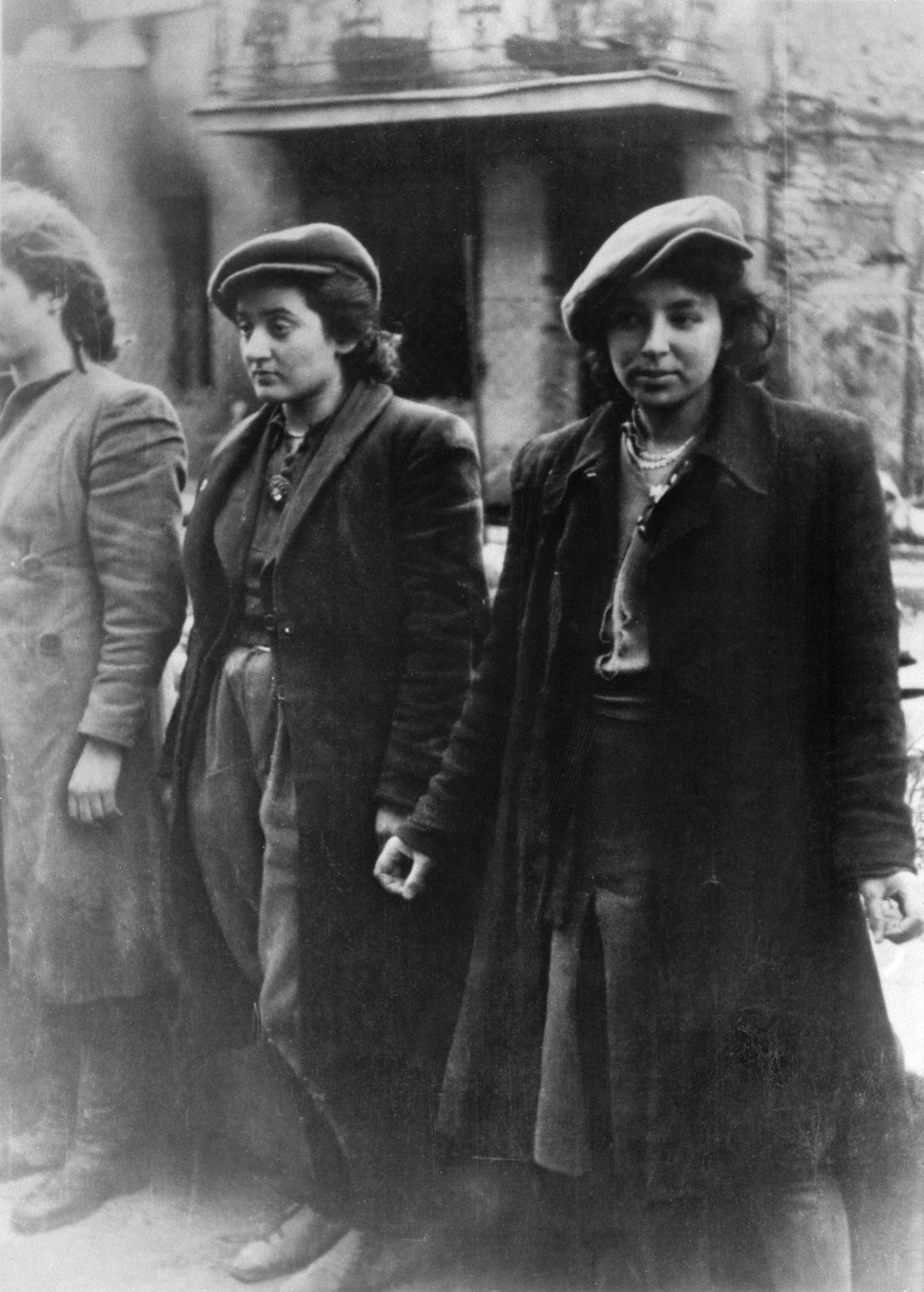
From right: Małka Zdrojewicz, Bluma Wyszogrodzka and Rachela Wyszogrodzka

A well-known Holocaust photograph depicts three Jewish women who fought in the Warsaw Ghetto Uprising, took shelter in a bunker with a weapons cache, and were forced out by SS soldiers. One of the women, Bluma Wyszogrodzka (center), was shot. The other two, Małka Zdrojewicz (right) and Rachela Wyszogrodzka (left) were marched to the Umschlagplatz and deported to Majdanek Concentration Camp, where Wyszogrodzka was murdered.

Jürgen Stroop, the SS officer who commanded the suppression of the uprising, admired the bravery of female combatants and included the photograph in one of the copies of his official report. The photograph has become symbolic of Jewish resistance to the Holocaust.

== Background ==
During the summer of 1942, most of the Jews in the Warsaw Ghetto were deported to Treblinka extermination camp. In January 1943, when the Germans resumed deportations, the Jewish Combat Organization staged armed resistance. Jews began to dig bunkers and smuggle weapons into the ghetto. On 19 April 1943, about 2,000 soldiers under the command of SS and Police Leader Jürgen Stroop entered the ghetto with tanks in order to liquidate the ghetto. They expected to quickly defeat the poorly armed Jewish insurgents, but instead the Warsaw Ghetto Uprising, the largest act of Jewish resistance against the Holocaust, dragged out for four weeks. The Germans had to set the ghetto on fire, pump poison gas into bunkers, and blast the Jews out of their positions in order to march them to the Umschlagplatz and deport them to Majdanek and Treblinka. The hopeless act of defiance became "one of the most significant occurrences in the history of the Jewish people", according to the United States Holocaust Memorial Museum.

Photograph 26 of the Warsaw version

During the suppression of the uprising, Stroop sent daily communiqués to Higher SS and Police Leader Friedrich-Wilhelm Krüger in Kraków; Propaganda Company 689 and Franz Konrad took photographs to document the events. Selected photographs and communiqués were compiled, along with a summary of German actions, as the Stroop Report, a personal souvenir for Heinrich Himmler. The report was intended to promote Stroop's efficiency as a commander and excuse his failure to clear the ghetto quickly. The report memorialized the supposed heroism of the SS men who participated in the suppression of the uprising, especially the sixteen who were killed by Jewish fighters. For comparison, more than 7,000 Jews were shot during the uprising, the vast majority noncombatants.

The original title of the report was The Jewish Quarter of Warsaw is No More! (German: Es gibt keinen jüdischen Wohnbezirk in Warschau mehr!). Reflecting Nazi propaganda, the report dehumanized the Jews, describing them as "bandits", "lice", or "rats" and their deportation and murder as a "cleansing action". Instead of being killed or murdered, Jews were "destroyed". Three copies of the report were made, for Himmler, Krüger, and Stroop. One copy of the Stroop Report is held by the Institute of National Remembrance (IPN) in Warsaw. Another copy of the report, which did not include this photograph, was entered into evidence at the Nuremberg Trials, and is held by the United States National Archives and Records Administration (NARA).

== People depicted ==
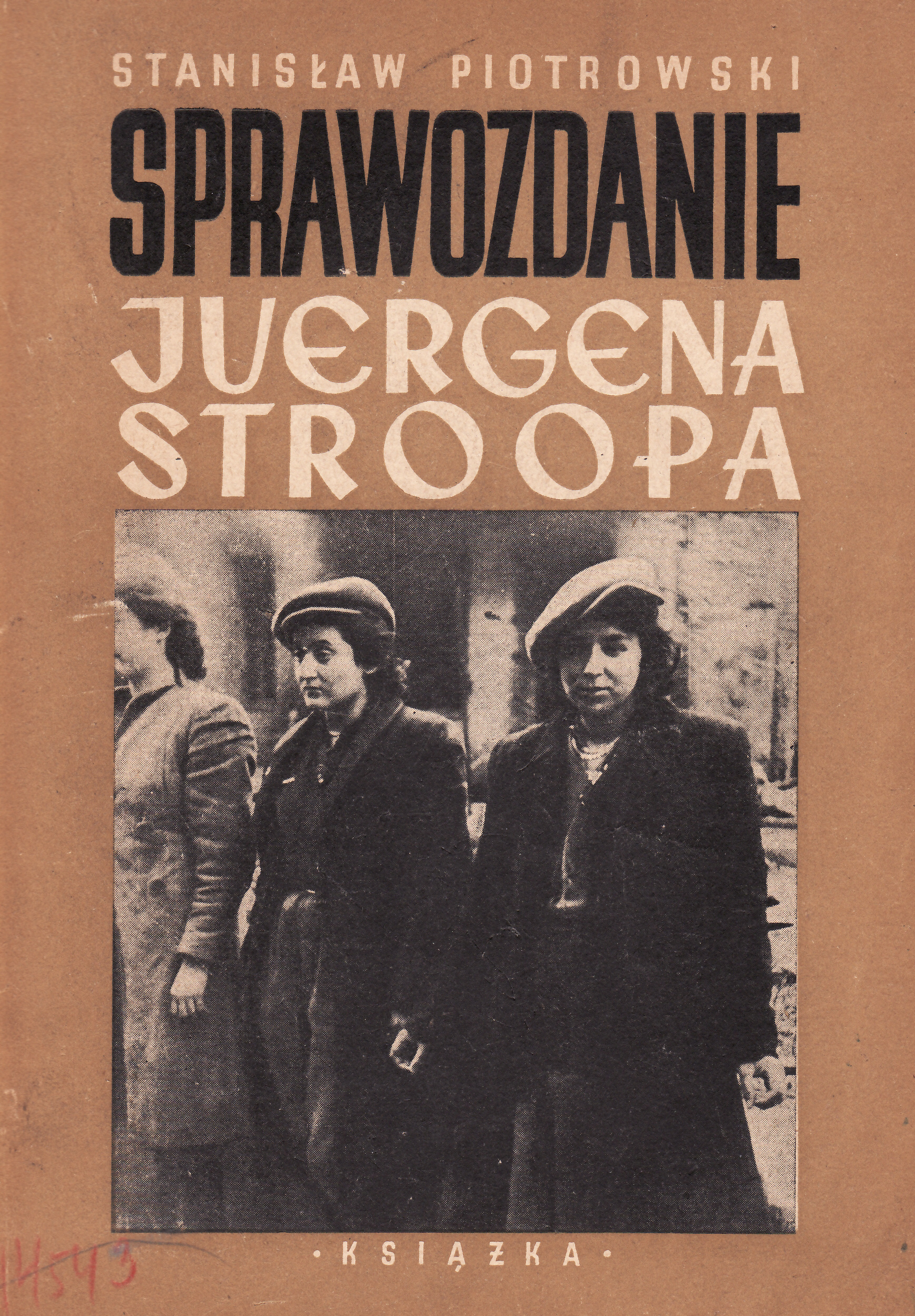
The photograph appeared on the cover of a 1948 book about the Stroop Report.

The only woman in the photograph who survived was the one at right, Małka Zdrojewicz. With other young women imprisoned in the Warsaw Ghetto, she was forced to work in a brush factory. As the final liquidation of the ghetto approached, Zdrojewicz and her colleagues deserted their jobs and descended into the sewers, stockpiling arms to resist the Nazis. She later testified that she smuggled arms into the ghetto in her boots and kept a cache under her bed. During the uprising, women deployed Molotov cocktails and other improvised weapons.

As the uprising was crushed, Zdrojewicz and some other resistance members hid in an underground bunker with stockpiled weapons, but they were found and forced out by SS men. According to Zdrojewicz, the Germans lined the Jews up against the wall and shot some of them, including Bluma Wyszogrodzka, the woman in the center of the photograph. Zdrojewicz and Bluma's sister, Rachela Wyszogrodzka, the woman on the left of the photograph, were marched to the Umschlagplatz and deported to Majdanek concentration camp. Zdrojewicz survived, but Rachela Wyszogrodzka did not. Zdrojewicz immigrated to Israel in 1946, married (changing her name to Horenstein), and had four children. Due to her injuries she was considered 75% disabled by the Israeli authorities. Horenstein's testimony was published by Yad Vashem.

The original caption of the photograph was Mit Waffen gefangene Weiber der Haluzzenbewegung ("Hehalutz women captured with weapons"). Jürgen Stroop later described the bravery of the Jewish women who took up arms:

Agile as acrobats, shooting with a pistol in each hand ... dangerous in hand-to-hand contact ... when a woman like this was caught, she appeared scared as a rabbit, thoroughly despairing, and suddenly, when a group of our men was nearby, she pulled out a grenade hidden in her skirt or in her pants and threw it at them with a string of curses on her lips ... In these instances we suffered losses, so that I ordered that these women not be held nor allowed to approach, but to finish them off with submachine guns.

== Legacy ==
Yellow badges photoshopped onto the women's lapels

The photograph is known as a famous representation of the Warsaw Ghetto uprising and of Jewish resistance during the Holocaust. The photograph was used for the first day of issue cover for a Polish stamp commemorating the seventieth anniversary of the Warsaw Ghetto Uprising. The original cover was controversial, since the graphic designer added yellow badges to the left lapels of the women. In fact, Jews in the Warsaw Ghetto were forced to wear blue Stars of David on white armbands, and the combatants discarded their armbands because they considered them humiliating symbols of Nazi oppression. Because of the lack of historical accuracy, some people objected to the cover. The cover was reissued without the Star of David badges.
