= List of SS personnel =

List of German Schutzstaffel members

Between 1925 and 1945, the German Schutzstaffel (SS) grew from eight members to over a quarter of a million Waffen-SS and over a million Allgemeine-SS members. Other members included the SS-Totenkopfverbände (SS-TV), which ran the Nazi concentration and extermination camps. The following list of SS personnel gives the names of notable persons who are counted among the organization's most famous, influential or notorious members. Women were not allowed to join the SS but were allowed into the SS-Gefolge and many served within the concentration camps.

== Führer (Adolf Hitler) ==
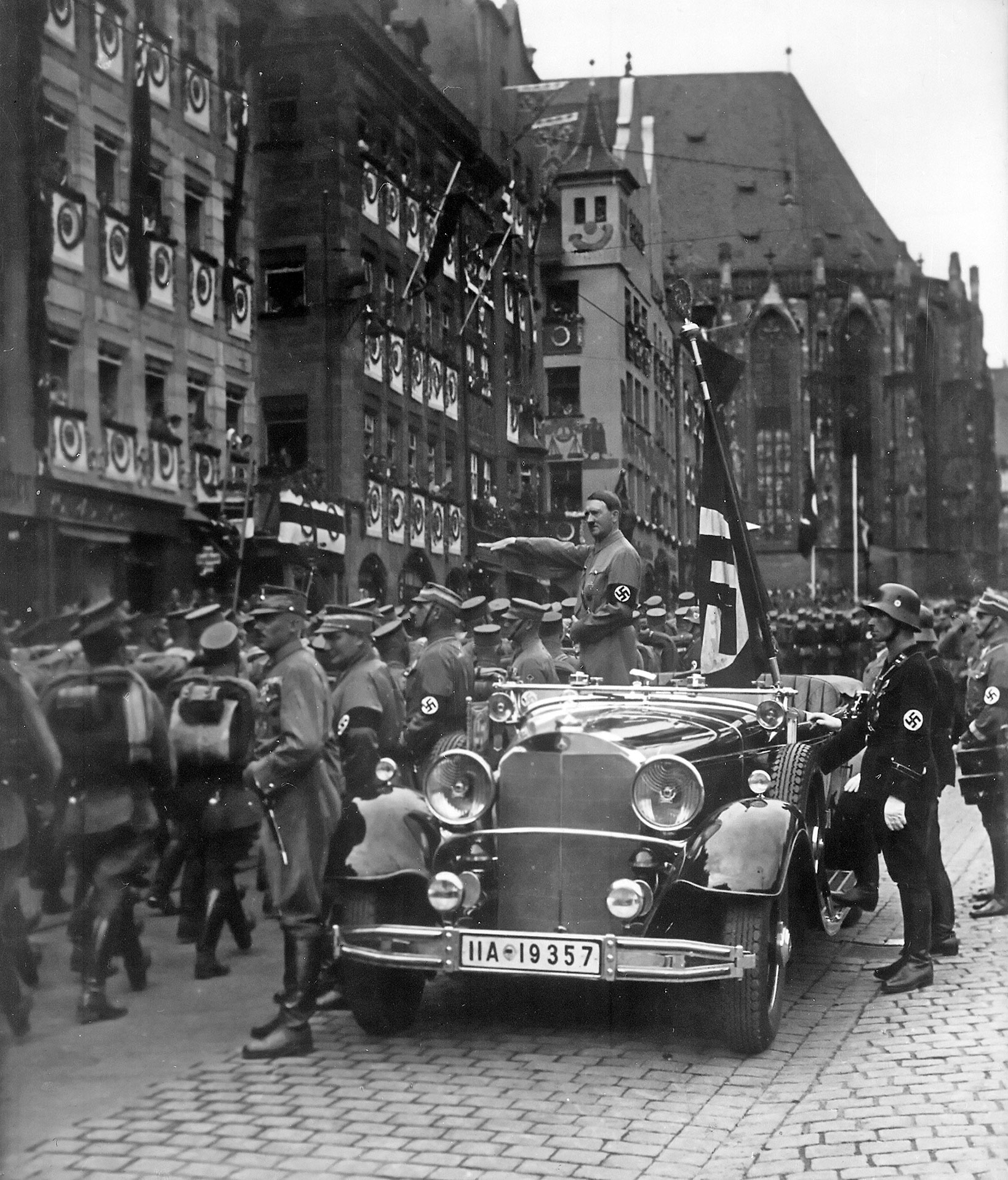
Oberster SA-Führer and SS Member no. 1 Adolf Hitler at SA Parade in Nürnberg, September 1935; SA at the left; SS-Sturmbannführer Jakob Grimminger behind car

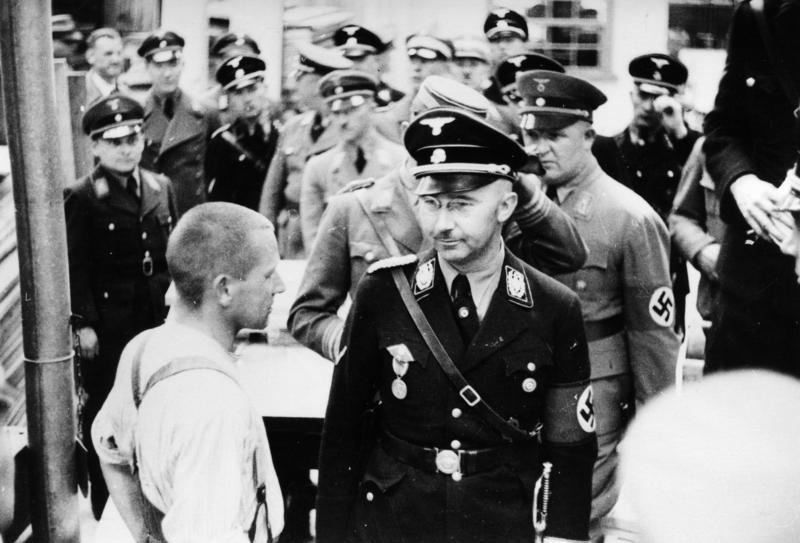
Inspection by the Nazi party and Himmler at the Dachau concentration camp on 8 May 1936

Prior to 1934 the SS were nominally under the command of the Sturmabteilung and so it could be said that both Adolf Hitler as Oberster SA-Führer and Ernst Röhm as Stabschef SA outranked the most senior SS position of Reichsführer-SS. Following the Night of the Long Knives Hitler "raised the SS, hitherto subordinate to the SA, to the rank of an independent organisation". Hitler also was considered SS Member No. 1, Emil Maurice (considered the founder of the SS) was member No. 2, although leadership was assumed by Julius Schreck who was member No. 5. Himmler was SS member No. 168. Based on the seniority system of SS membership number, this made Hitler senior in the SS to all other members even if not by rank.

After the Night of the Long Knives, when the SS became independent from the SA, Hitler was listed on SS officer rolls as member No. 1 and considered supreme commander of the entire SS (Oberster Führer der Schutzstaffel: Literally, "Supreme Leader of the SS") by virtue of his position as the Führer of Germany. There is no photographic record of Hitler ever wearing an actual SS uniform nor was there a special SS insignia for Hitler above that worn by Himmler.

== SS Generals ==
Following is the list of persons holding the title positions as well as actual highest ranks of the Schutzstaffel (SS) since the earliest inception of the armed SS units in Nazi Germany. The ranks include distinctive insignia designs worn on the collar at one point by all officers.

=== Reichsführer ===
| Name | Position | SS number | Joined SS | Party number |
|---|---|---|---|---|
Reichsführer-SS (1925–1945)
| Julius Schreck | Leader of the Stoßtrupp-Hitler; First Reichsführer-SS (1925–1926); Hitler's chauffeur Later held the ranks of SS-Standartenführer and SS-Oberführer; Posthumously ranks: SS-Brigadeführer and SS-Ehrenführer of the SS Regiment Munich | 5 | 1923 (Stoßtrupp); 1925 (SS) | 53 |
| Joseph Berchtold | Co-leader of the Stoßtrupp-Hitler; Second Reichsführer-SS (1926–1927) | | 1923 (Stoßtrupp); 1925 (SS) | 750 |
| Erhard Heiden | Third Reichsführer-SS (1927–1929) | | 1923 (Stoßtrupp); 1925 (SS) | 74 |
| Heinrich Himmler | Fourth Reichsführer-SS (1929–1945); Chief of German Police (1936–1945); Minister of the Interior (1943–1945); Chief of the Replacement Army (1944–1945) | 168 | 2 August 1925 | 14303 |
| Karl Hanke | Final Reichsführer-SS (1945) | 203013 | 15 February 1933 | 102606 |

=== Oberst-Gruppenführer (colonel general) ===
| Name | Position | SS number | Joined SS | Party number |
|---|---|---|---|---|
Oberst-Gruppenführer (April 1942–1945)
| Kurt Daluege | Commander of the Ordnungspolizei (Orpo-Order Police) | 1119 | July 1930 | 31981 |
| Sepp Dietrich | Original commander of the Leibstandarte SS Adolf Hitler (LSSAH) and later commander of the 6th SS Panzer Army | 1117 | 5 May 1928 | 89015 |
| Paul Hausser | Commander of the II SS Panzer Corps | 239795 | February 1934 | 4158779 |
| Franz Xaver Schwarz | NSDAP Treasurer | 38500 | 16 September 1931 | 6 |

=== Obergruppenführer (general) ===
| Name | Position | SS number | Joined SS | Party number |
|---|---|---|---|---|
Obergruppenführer (1932–1945)
| Friedrich Alpers | Staatssekretär / SS-Obergruppenführer / Staatsrat / Generalforstmeister / Major der Reserve (Luftwaffe) | 6427 | March 1931 | 132812 |
| Max Amann | Honorary SS Member. Reichsleiter of the Press Department | 53143 | | 3 |
| Erich von dem Bach-Zelewski | Higher SS and Police Leader of Central Russia | 9831 | 15 February 1931 | 489101 |
| Herbert Backe | Minister of Agriculture 1944–1945 | 22766 | 1 October 1933 | 87882 |
| Gottlob Berger | Commander of the SS-Hauptamt | 275991 | 1936 | 426875 |
| Werner Best | Reich Plenipotentiary of Denmark | 23377 | 1931 | 341338 |
| Wilhelm Bittrich | Waffen-SS combat commander, II SS Panzerkorps | 39177 | 1934 | 829700 |
| Ernst Wilhelm Bohle | Leader of the National Socialist German Workers' Party Foreign Organization | 276915 | 13 September 1933 | 999185 |
| Martin Bormann | Reichsleiter in charge of the Party Chancellery | 555 | 1937 | 60508 |
| Philipp Bouhler | Head of the Action T4/Reichsleiter in charge of the Hitler's Chancellery (Kanzlei des Führers) | 54932 | 20 April 1933 | 12 |
| Walter Braemer | Born 7 January 1883. Involved in war crimes in Poland; captured 2 May 1945-released October 1947; 1945 request for extradition for war crimes in Poland was refused by the British government in 1950. Died 13 June 1955 | 223910 | 1 October 1935 | 401232 |
| Franz Breithaupt | Commanding general of the SS and Police Courts | 39719 | 1 December 1932 | 602663 |
| Walter Buch | Reichsleiter as Chairman of the Inquiry and Mediation Board | 81353 | 1 July 1933 | 7733 |
| Dr. Leonardo Conti | State Secretary for health matters | 3982 | | 72225 |
| Richard Walther Darré | First Director of the Race and Settlement Office (Rasse- und Siedlungshauptamt or RuSHA), and Reichsminister for Food and Agriculture | 6882 | July 1930 | 248156 |
| Karl-Maria Demelhuber | Commanded the SS-Standarte Germania, 6. SS-Gebirgs-Division Nord, XII. SS-Armeekorps and XVI. SS-Armeekorps. | 252392 | 15 March 1935 | 4439 |
| Otto Dietrich | Reichsleiter as NSDAP Press Chief (honorary rank) | 101349 | 1932 | 126727 |
| Karl von Eberstein | Early member of the Nazi Party, the SA, the SS, Reichstag deputy, an HSSPF and SS-Oberabschnitt Führer, head of the Munich Police in World War II | 1386 | 1 April 1929 | 15067 |
| Joachim Albrecht Eggeling | Gauleiter of Saxony and Anhalt; Oberpräsident of Merseburg | 186155 | 1935 | 11579 |
| Theodor Eicke | First chief of the Inspektion der Konzentrationslager (Concentration Camps Inspectorate) and commander of the SS Totenkopf Division | 2921 | August 1930 | 114901 |
| Karl Fiehler | Mayor of Munich/Reichsleiter in charge of the communal policy | 91724 | 31 July 1933 | 37 |
| Albert Forster | Gauleiter of Danzig | 158 | 12 June 1926 | 1924 |
| August Frank | Born 5 April 1898. Frank became SS Administrative Officer of the Special Purpose Troops (SS-Verfügungstruppe) and of the concentration camp guards, the SS Death's Head units (SS-Totenkopfverbände or SS-TV), although somewhat limited in his authority in the second capacity. In February 1940, Frank became chief supply officer of the Waffen-SS and SS-TV units under Pohl. In Pohl Trial sentenced to life in prison; 1951 commuted to 15 years. Died March 1984 | 5669 | 8 April 1932 | 1471185 |
| Hans Frank | General Governor of Poland 1939–1945 | | | |
| Karl Hermann Frank | Higher SS and Police Leader of Bohemia and Moravia. State Minister of the Protectorate of Bohemia and Moravia 1943–1945 | 310466 | | 6600002 |
| Herbert Otto Gille | Waffen-SS commander of 5th SS Panzer Division Wiking | 39854 | December 1931 | 537337 |
| Curt von Gottberg | General of Waffen-SS | 45923 | September 1932 | 948753 |
| Ernst-Robert Grawitz | Reichsarzt SS and Polizei; Head of German Red Cross; son in law of SS-Obergruppenführer und General der Waffen-SS Siegfried Taubert | 27483 | November 1931 | 1102844 |
| Ulrich Greifelt | Held the rank of major general by 1941, and then being appointed as "Chief of SS German Nationhood Staff", a position he held from November 1941 through his arrest by the Allied forces in May 1945. | 72909 | | 1667407 |
| Arthur Greiser | Gauleiter of Reichsgau Wartheland | 10795 | 1929 | 166635 |
| Karl Gutenberger | Police President in Duisburg and in Essen. Higher SS and Police Leader "West". Oversaw "Operation Carnival" in which Werwolf operatives murdered Mayor Franz Oppenhoff of Aachen | 372303 | June 1940 | 25249 |
| August Heissmeyer | Chief, SS Main Office; Higher SS and Police Leader "Spree"; Inspector, National Political Institutes of Education | 4370 | 17 December 1930 | 21573 |
| Wolf-Heinrich Graf von Helldorf | He wore the uniform of a General der Polizei in his capacity as Polizeipräsident of Berlin; SA-Obergruppenführer | None | | |
| Konrad Henlein | Gauleiter of the Sudetenland | 310307 | | 6600001 |
| Maximilian von Herff | Chief of the SS Personnel Main Office, 1942–1945 | 405894 | 1 April 1942 | 8858661 |
| Rudolf Hess | Also Deputy-Führer of the NSDAP until 11 May 1941 | 50 | 1 November 1925 | 16 |
| Reinhard Heydrich | Chief of the RSHA; President of Interpol; chaired the 1942 Wannsee Conference; Deputy Reich-Protector of Bohemia and Moravia | 10120 | 14 July 1931 | 544916 |
| Friedrich Hildebrandt | Born 19 September 1898, Parchim, Mecklenburg-Schwerin. Served in World War I and post-war in Freikorps, Gauleiter of Mecklenburg; tried, convicted and executed 5 November 1948 in Landsberg am Lech for war crimes | 128802 | 5 December 1933 | 3.653 |
| Richard Hildebrandt | Born 13 March 1897. Served in World War I and the Freikorps. Higher SS and Police Leader in Danzig and Black Sea area. Led the SS Race and Settlement Main Office (1943–1945). Convicted of crimes against humanity and executed on 10 March 1951, in Bydgoszcz, Poland. | 7088 | February 1931 | 89221 |
| Hermann Höfle | Born 12 September 1898 in Augsburg; Served in World War I and postwar in the Freikorps; Higher SS and Police Leader in Slovakia; tried and executed 9 December 1947 in Bratislava | 463903 | July 1943 | 3924970 |
| Otto Hofmann | Head of RuSHA, 1940–1943; Higher SS and Police Leader Southwest Germany; Wannsee Conference participant | 7646 | 1931 | 145729 |
| Friedrich Jeckeln | Higher SS and Police Leader of Eastern Russia | 4367 | 12 January 1930 | 163348 |
| Hugo Jury | Born 13 July 1887. Gauleiter of "Reichsgau Niederdonau" (Lower Austria). As of 1940 he was also Reichsstatthalter (Governor) and, as of 1942, also Reich Defense Commissioner for this region. Died 8 May 1945 | 292777 | 12 March 1938 | 410338 |
| Hans Jüttner | Commander of the SS-Führungshauptamt | 264497 | | 541163 |
| Ernst Kaltenbrunner | Second Chief of the RSHA after Heydrich's assassination. Executed by hanging in October 1946. | 13039 | | 300179 |
| Hans Kammler | Born 26 August 1901. Head of V-2 program. Declared legally dead 9 May 1945 | 113619 | 20 May 1933 | 1011855 |
| Georg Keppler | Keppler commanded the 2. SS-Division Das Reich, 3. SS-Division Totenkopf, I. SS-Panzerkorps, III.(germanische) SS-Panzerkorps and the XVIII. SS-Armee-Korps. | 273799 | 10 October 1935 | 338211 |
| Wilhelm Karl Keppler | Secretary of state in Foreign Office; founder of the Freundeskreis der Wirtschaft | 50816 | August 1932 | 62424 |
| Matthias Kleinheisterkamp | Waffen-SS Divisional and Corps Commander | 132399 | 8 January 1934 | 4158838 |
| Wilhelm Koppe | Höhere SS und Polizei Führer, HSSP in Wartheland | 25955 | 2 January 1932 | 305584 |
| Friedrich-Wilhelm Krüger | Higher SS and Police Leader of Poland | 6123 | 16 March 1931 | 3995130 |
| Walter Krüger | Commander of: 4th SS Polizei Panzer Division. 2nd SS Panzer Division Das Reich. IV SS Panzer Corps. VI. SS-Freiwilligen-Armeekorps (lettisches) | 266184 | | 3991530 |
| Hans Lammers | Minister of the Reich. Head of the Reich Chancellery (honorary rank) | 118404 | | 1010355 |
| Hartmann Lauterbacher | Gauleiter of Südhannover-Braunschweig, Reichstatthalter of Braunschweig, Oberpräsident of Hannover, SS-Obergruppenführer, member of the Reichstag / Preußischer Staatsrat | 382406 | 9 November 1940 | 86837 |
| Werner Lorenz | Commander of the Main Office of Ethnic Germanization (Hauptamt Volkdeutsche Mittelstelle) | 6636 | 1931 | 337994 |
| Benno Martin | SS-Obergruppenführer, General of the Waffen-SS and Police and Higher SS and Police Leader (Höhere SS und Polizei Führer) in Nuremberg. | 187117 | 10 April 1934 | 2714474 |
| Emil Mazuw | Landeshauptmann (nominal governor) of the province of Pomerania from 1940 to 1945. A member of the SS since 1933, he held the ranks of SS-Obergruppenführer, General of the Waffen-SS (1944), General of Police (1942) and Ostsee Higher SS and Police leader (1939–1945). He was engaged in euthanasia during the Second World War. Convicted after the war of crimes associated with abuses of political prisoners and Jews; sentenced to 16 years imprisonment. | 2556 | 7 June 1930 | 85231 |
| Wilhelm Murr | Born 16. Dezember 1888 in Esslingen am Neckar; Gauleiter of Württemberg-Hohenzollern, and from early 1933 held the offices of State President and Reichsstatthalter ("Governor") of Württemberg. Died 14 May 1945 in Egg. | 147545 | 9 September 1934 | 12873 |
| Konstantin von Neurath | German Foreign Minister 1932–1938; Reich Protector of Bohemia Moravia 1939–1943 | | 1937 | |
| Carl Oberg | Higher SS and Police Leader of France | 36075 | 7 April 1932 | 575205 |
| Günther Pancke | Higher SS and Police Leader of Denmark; Waffen-SS General | 10110 | 1931 | 282737 |
| Karl Pfeffer-Wildenbruch | SS-Obergruppenführer, General der Waffen-SS und der Polizei, during World War II, he commanded the 4th SS Polizei Division and the VI SS Army Corps and the IX SS Mountain Corps. | 292713 | March 1939 | 1364387 |
| Artur Phleps | Commander of the 7. SS-Freiwilligen-Gebirgs-Division Prinz Eugen | 401214 | 30 June 1941 | |
| Oswald Pohl | Chief of the SS Economics and Administration Office (WVHA) | 147614 | 1933 | 30842 |
| Hans-Adolf Prützmann | SS-Obergruppenführer und General der Polizei; General of Waffen-SS | 3002 | | 142290 |
| Rudolf Querner | From 1 May 1941 to the end of January 1943 Querner was SS and Police Leader (HSSPF) Nordsee in Military district X, based in Hamburg. He worked closely with Gauleiter Karl Kaufmann Querners had responsibility over all police matters and was involved in the deportation of the Hamburg Jews, which began at the end of October 1941. | 308240 | 22 May 1938 | 2385386 |
| Hanns Albin Rauter | SS and Police Leader in the Netherlands | 262958 | | Joined Austrian Nazi Party |
| Wilhelm Rediess | SS and Police Leader in Norway | 2839 | 22 July 1930 | 25574 |
| Wilhelm Reinhard | Reichsführer of the Kyffhäuserbund | 274104 | 15 September 1935 | 63074 |
| Joachim von Ribbentrop | Foreign minister 1938–1945 | 63083 | February 1938 | 1199927 |
| Erwin Rösener | 24 November 1941 – 8 May 1945 Higher SS and Police Leader at SS-Oberabschnitt Alpenland (Wehrkreis XVIII; HQ: Salzburg) | 3575 | 1930 | 46771 |
| Ernst Sachs | Born 24 December 1880. Chief of Telecommunications at the Personal Staff of the Reichsführer-SS and a consultant for intelligence. In July 1948 he was sentenced to 30 months in a labour camp, five years of professional restriction, and 30% confiscation of assets. Died 23 August 1956. | 278781 | 9 November 1936 | 4167008 |
| Fritz Sauckel | Gauleiter of Thuringia | 254890 | | 1395 |
| Paul Scharfe | Commander of the SS Legal Main Office | 14220 | 1 October 1931 | 665697 |
| Julius Schaub | Co-founder of the SS, personal assistant to Hitler | 7 | February 1925 | 81 |
| Dr. Johann Friedrich Scheid | Director of Hermsdorf-Schönburg GMBH. Had Honorary SS Rank. In August 1944 presided over a secret meeting with German industrialists to using assets to rebuild Germany in the postwar period. Listed in 1944 reference and 1946 reference | | | |
| Ernst-Heinrich Schmauser | Higher SS and Police Leader "Südost" in Silesia; also General der Polizei; General of the Waffen-SS | 3359 | 14 October 1930 | 215704 |
| Walter Schmitt | Chief of the SS Personnel Main Office, 1939–1942 | 28737 | 1 August 1931 | 592784 |
| Arthur Seyss-Inquart | Leader of NS opposition in Austria prior to the Anschluss, Deputy governor-general of Poland then Reichskommissar for the Reich in Netherlands | 292771 | | 6270392 |
| Felix Steiner | Commander of III (Germanic) SS Panzer Corps | 253351 | | 4264295 |
| Dr. Wilhelm Stuckart | Born 16 November 1902. Reich Interior State Secretary; author of Nuremberg Race Laws of 1935; participant in Wannsee Conference in 1942. In 1949, sentenced to 4 years but released for time already served. Died in a car accident in 1953. | 280042 | | 378144 |
| Fritz Wächtler | Born 7 January 1891 – died 19 April 1945. Gauleiter of Bayerische Ostmark | 209058 | November 1934 | 35313 |
| Prince Josias, Hereditary Prince of Waldeck and Pyrmont | SS-Obergruppenführer and Higher SS and Police Leader of the SS-Oberabschnitt Fulda-Werra | 2139 | 2 March 1930 | 160025 |
| Fritz Weitzel | He became a member of Nazi Party in 1925 and of SS in 1926. In 1930 he was promoted to leader of SS in Rheinland and Ruhr. He became Polizeipräsident in Düsseldorf in 1933, and Höherer SS- und Polizeiführer West in 1938. | 408 | 1927 | 18833 |
| Karl Wolff | Chief of staff to Heinrich Himmler and Supreme SS and Police Leader of Italy | 14235 | 7 October 1931 | 695131 |
| Udo von Woyrsch | Higher SS and Police Leader in the SS-Oberabschnitt Südost | 3689 | | 162349 |
| Alfred Wünnenberg | SS-Obergruppenführer und General der Waffen-SS and the commander of the 4th SS Polizei Panzer Grenadier Division Last Commander of the Main Office for Uniformed Police forces (Ordnungspolizei) | 405898 | 2 October 1939 | 2222600 |

=== Gruppenführer (lieutenant general) ===
| Name | Position | SS number | Joined SS | Party number |
|---|---|---|---|---|
Gruppenführer (1925–1945)
| Ludolf von Alvensleben | Born 17 March 1901. Held ranks of NSDAP-Reichstagsabgeordneter, SS-Gruppenführer and Generalleutnant der Waffen-SS; commander of the Selbstschutz of Reichsgau Danzig-West Prussia and Major General of the police (1943). Higher SS and police leader in Silesia. Escaped to Argentina. Died 1 April 1970 | 177002 | 5 April 1934 | 149345 |
| Hans Baur | Hitler's pilot | 808258 | 1933 | None, but received Golden Party Badge |
| Adolf von Bomhard | Also Generalleutnant of the Ordnungspolizei; Chief of the Command Office of the Uniformed Police Main Office | 3,933,982 | 1938 | 292,711 |
| Dr. Karl Brandt | Hitler's physician | 260353 | 29 July 1934 | 1009617 |
| Karl-Heinrich Brenner | Gruppenführer and Generalleutnant of Polizei | 307786 | 11 September 1938 | 3460685 |
| Josef Bürckel | Born 30 March 1895, in Lingenfeld, Germersheim. Gauleiter of Pfalz-Saar and of Vienna. Died 28 September 1944 | 289830 | 1937 | 33979 |
| Carl Clauberg | German gynocologist at Auschwitz and later Ravensbrück. | Unknown | 1933 | Unknown |
| Hermann Fegelein | SS-Cavalry General, Eva Braun's brother-in-law. Commander of the 8th SS Cavalry Division Florian Geyer | 66680 | 1931 | 1200158 |
| Josef Fitzthum | SS-Gruppenführer, Generalleutnant der Waffen-SS und Polizei, politician, and Beauftragter des Reichsführer-SS Albanien (special representative of the Reichsführer-SS in Albania) | 41936 | 1932 | 363169 |
| Helmuth Friedrichs | Born 22 Sept 1899. Office of the Deputy Führer. Disappeared February 1945-fate unknown | 278229 | 1936 | 124214 |
| Alfred Freyberg | Born 12 July 1892. Minister-Präsident of Anhalt; Oberbűrgermeister of Leipzig; suicide 18 April 1945 | 113650 | 22 November 1933 | 5880 |
| Karl Gebhardt | "Reichsarzt-SS"; also a major general (Generalmajor) in the Waffen-SS | 265894 | 1935 | 1723317 |
| Dr. Karl Genzken | Chief of Medical Office of the Waffen-SS. Involved in human experiments | 207954 | 5 November 1933 | 39913 |
| Odilo Globocnik | Higher SS and Police Leader of the Adriatic Region; Head of Operation Reinhard as SSPF Lublin (Poland) | 292776 | 1 September 1934 | 442939 |
| Richard Glücks | Inspector of Concentration Camps/Amt D WVHA | 58706 | 1932 | 214805 |
| Hans Haltermann | SS and Police Leader in Kiev, Charkow and Mogilew | 276294 | 1936 | 44393 |
| Wilhelm Harster | A lieutenant general in the SS and Commander of the Security Police and SD first in the Netherlands and then in Italy, Harster was directly connected with the Holocaust in two countries. | 225932 | 9 November 1933 | 3226594 |
| Franz Hayler | Born 29 August 1900. State Secretary in the Reich Ministry of Economics and deputy to the Reich Economics Minister Walter Funk; was also a member of the Freundeskreis der Wirtschaft (Circle of Friends of the Economy), a group of German industrialists whose aim was to strengthen the ties between the Nazi Party and business and industry. He also held the post of Wehrwirtschaftsführer (Military Economic Leader). Died 11 September 1972) | 64,697 | 1933 | 754,133 |
| Paul Hennicke | SS and Police Leader in Rostow-Awdejewka, Kiev; Police President of Weimar | 1332 | 24 February 1929 | 36492 |
| Hans Hinkel | Journalist and commissioner at the Reich Ministry for the People's Enlightenment and Propaganda | 9148 | 1931 | 4686 |
| Fritz Katzmann | SS and Police Leader in Radom, Lemberg; Higher SS and Police Leader in Danzig-West Prussia | 3065 | 1 July 1930 | 98528 |
| Gerhard Klopfer | Born 18 February 1905. Attended Wannsee Conference 20 January 1942. Died 29 January 1987 | 272227 | 1935 | 1706842 |
| Wilhelm Kube | General-Kommissar for Weissruthenien (Belarus) | 114771 | 1934 | 71682 |
| Wilhelm Friedrich Loeper | Honorary rank; Gauleiter of Magdeburg-Anhalt | 142592 | 1934 | 6980 |
| Georg Lörner | Born 18 February 1899. Deputy Chief under Oswald Pohl of the SS-Wirtschafts-Verwaltungshauptamt (SS Main Economic and Administrative Office, SS WVHA); chief of Amtsgruppe B, (Division B) of the WVHA, and deputy chief of Amtsgruppe W (Division W) of the WVHA. Condemned to death in 1946-commuted to 15 years-released March 1954-died 21 April 1959. Brother of SS Colonel Hans Loerner. | 37719 | July 1932 | 676772 |
| Wilhelm Meinberg | Reich Chairman of the Reichsnährstand; Board of Directors, Reichswerke Hermann Göring; chairman of the neo-Nazi Deutsche Reichspartei, 1955–1960. | 99436 | 7 October 1933 | 218582 |
| Paul Moder | Senator of Altona, Hamburg; Sturmbannführer (major) in Waffen-SS; SS-Führer and Polizeiführer (Warsaw) | 11716 | 1 September 1931 | 9425 |
| Heinrich Müller | Chief of the Gestapo (Secret State Police), Amt IV (Department IV) of the RSHA; Wannsee Conference participant | 107043 | 20 April 1934 | 533199 |
| Arthur Mülverstadt | SS-Gruppenführer and Generalleutnant der Polizei; Commander of 4th SS Polizei Division | 292712 | 1938 | 1331860 |
| Arthur Nebe | Chief of the Kriminalpolizei (Criminal Police), Amt V (Department V) of the RSHA, Einsatzgruppe B Commander (June–November 1941) | 280152 | 1931 | 574307 |
| Otto Ohlendorf | Commander of the Inland-SD, Amt III (Department III) of the RSHA | 880 | 28 May 1925 | 6531 |
| Werner Ostendorff | Dual rank as SS-Gruppenführer and Generalleutnant der Waffen-SS; Commander of 17th SS Panzergrenadier Division Götz von Berlichingen and 2nd SS Panzer Division Das Reich | 257146 | 1 October 1935 | 1691488 |
| Hermann Prieß | Commander of 3rd SS Division Totenkopf following the death of Theodor Eicke in February 1943. Commanding officer of the 1st SS-Panzerkorps "Leibstandarte" during the Battle of the Bulge. Hermann Prieß was convicted of war crimes because of his involvement in the Malmedy massacre and was sentenced to 20 years imprisonment. He was released in 1954. | 113258 | 1934 | 1472296 |
| Carl Friedrich von Pückler-Burghauss | Commander of the 15th Waffen Grenadier Division of the SS (1st Latvian); Commander of Waffen-SS in the Protectorate of Bohemia and Moravia | 365136 | 1 July 1940 | 788697 |
| Johann Rattenhuber | Commander of the Reichssicherheitsdienst (RSD); (Hitler bodyguard unit) | 52877 | 1 May 1933 | 3212449 |
| Eggert Reeder | Chief of the German Military Administration next to the Commander of Wehrmacht in occupied Belgium and northern France | 340776 | 1933 | 1998009 |
| Heinz Reinefarth | Waffen-SS and Police General/Senior SS and Police Leader in Wartheland (former Polish Posnania) | 56634 | December 1932 | 1268933 |
| Karl-Gustav Sauberzweig | 2nd Commander of 13th Waffen-SS Division | | 1 August 1943 | |
| Walter Schimana | SS-Gruppenführer and Generalleutnant der Waffen-SS and police. SSPF for Central Russia; and HSSPF for Greece; and Danube Sector | 337753 | 1934 | 49402 |
| Fritz von Scholz | Born 9 December 1896. Commander of 11th SS Volunteer Panzergrenadier Division Nordland. Died 28 July 1944 | 135638 | 1937 | 1304071 |
| Ludwig von Schröder | Commander of military forces in Serbia; also a Luftwaffe General | 288,517 | 1 October 1937 | |
| Otto Schumann | Commander of Ordnungspolizei (BdO), Reichskommissariat Niederlande; Inspector of Ordnungspolizei (IdO), Wehrkreise II, VI & XVII; also Generalleutnant der Polizei | 327367 | 20 April 1939 | 1753690 |
| Siegfried Seidel-Dittmarsch | Chief, SS-Führungstab; Chief, SS-Amt | 18615 | October 1931 | |
| Max Simon | SS-Gruppenführer (major general) and Generalleutnant der Waffen-SS, commander of the XIII SS Army Corps | 83086 | May 1933 | 1350576 |
| Jakob Sporrenberg | SS-Gruppenführer (major general) and Generalleutnant der Polizei in Minsk, Russia, and Lubin, Poland | 3809 | 1 October 1930 | 25585 |
| Bruno Streckenbach | SS-Gruppenführer and Generalleutnant der Waffen-SS. Captured by Soviets and in 1952 was sentenced to 25 years in prison, but released 10 October 1955. The West German government brought Streckenbach to trial in 1973, but the case was dismissed due "to the defendant's poor health". Died on 28 October 1977 | 14713 | 1 September 1931 | 489792 |
| Jürgen Stroop | SS and Police Leader of Warsaw; later senior SS and police leader in Greece | 44611 | 7 July 1932 | 1292297 |
| Max Thomas | Befehlshaber der Sicherheitspolizei und der SD (BdS) Belgium & northern France; BdS Ukraine; Commander of Einsatzgruppe C; Higher SS and Police Leader "Black Sea"; Generalleutnant der Polizei | 141341 | 1 July 1933 | 1,848,453 |
| Karl Fischer von Treuenfeld | Befehlshaber Waffen-SS in the Protectorate of Bohemia-Moravia; Commander, 10th SS Panzer Division Frundsberg; Generalleutnant der Waffen-SS | 323792 | 1 May 1939 | – |
| Harald Turner | Chief of military administration's staff in Serbia; Deputy Chief, SS Race and Settlement Main Office | 34,799 | April 1932 | 970,460 |
| Otto Wächter | Born 8 July 1901. Governor of Kraków and Governor of Galicia District. Died 14 July 1949 | 235338 | March 1935 | 301093 |
| Dr. Richard Wendler | Born 22 January 1898. Gouverneur von Lublin 15.2.42 – 27.2.41; MWGB Gouverneur Krakau to 25.5.43; Gouverneur Lublin 26.5.43 – 22.7.44; involved with the Czestochowa Ghetto. Died 28 August 1972. His sister was married to Gebhard Himmler, brother of Heinrich Himmler. | 36050 | 1 April 1933 | 93116 |
| Karl Zech | Police President in Essen; SS and Police Leader in Kraków District. Expelled from the SS and committed suicide 1 April 1944. | 4555 | 19 January 1931 | 408563 |

=== Brigadeführer (major general) ===
| Name | Position | SS number | Joined SS | Party number |
|---|---|---|---|---|
Brigadeführer (1932–1945)
| Hugo von Abercron | SS Major general | | 1933 | |
| Otto Abetz | German ambassador to Vichy France; sentenced to 20 years in 1949 for war crimes; released 1954. Died 1958 | 253314 | 1 August 1935 | 7011453 |
| Karl Wilhelm Albert | Born 8 September 1898. Joined the NSDAP and SS in 1932 and began working for the Sicherheitsdienst (SD), the intelligence service of the SS. In autumn 1933, as an SS-Sturmführer, Albert was entrusted with the direction of the SD-Oberabschnitt West section of the SD, located in Düsseldorf, and later the Oberabschnitt Rhein section, located in Frankfurt. In 1935, he succeeded Werner Best as the chief of staff and the organization of the central administration of the SD. After the reorganization of the SD in January 1936, Albert took over the management of one of its three bureaus, the newly created Amt I (Administration). This promotion made him one of the five leaders highest in the hierarchy, along with Reinhard Heydrich, Werner Best, Heinz Jost and Franz Six. After the founding of the SS-(RSHA), Albert took over the Central Section I (staff, administration, organization). In April 1939, Albert was promoted to SS-Brigadeführer. In 1939, he was appointed along with Werner Best, Walter Schellenberg and Kurt Pomme as director of the Stiftung Nordhav. During World War II, Albert was chief of police in Litzmannstadt (Łódź). After his replacement in 1944, he became the successor to the district president Hans Burkhardt in the district Hohensalza in Reichsgau Wartheland. Interned until 1947. Died 21 April 1960 | 36189 | 1 August 1932 | 1122215 |
| Georg Altner | Police President in Plauen and Dortmund; also Generalmajor der Polizei. | 1421 | 10 May 1929 | 34339 |
| Alwin-Broder Albrecht | | | | |
| Franz Augsberger | Generalmajor der Waffen-SS-20th Waffen Grenadier Division of the SS (1st Estonian) | 139528 | 20 April 1932 | 360700 |
| Lothar Beutel | Born 6 May 1902 in Leipzig. Einsatzgruppen IV commander 1939. Died 16 May 1986 in Berlin-Steglitz | 2422 | 1930 | 135238 |
| Walther Bierkamp | Born 17 December 1901 in Hamburg; also a Generalmajor der Polizei; Commander of SiPo and SD: Düsseldorf, Belgium & northern France, General Government, Südwest; Commander of Einsatzgruppe D; Acting Higher SS and Police Leader, Südost; suicide 15 May 1945. | 310,172 | 1 April 1939 | 1,408,449 |
| Gottfried Graf von Bismarck-Schönhausen | Member of the Reichstag; chairman of the regional council (Regierungspräsident) for Stettin, and later also for Potsdam. | | | |
| Dr. Hugo Blaschke | Hitler's dentist. Brigadeführer and Generalmajor der Waffen-SS | 256882 | 2 May 1935 | 452082 |
| Wilhelm Börger | Ministerial Director, Reich Ministry of Labor | 247066 | 1935 | 150841 |
| Herbert Böttcher | SS and Police Leader "Radom"; Police Director, Memel; Police President, Kassel; also Generalmajor der Polizei. Hanged as a war criminal in Radom, 12 June 1950. | 323036 | March 1939 | 7093097 |
| Andreas Bolek | Honorary Gauleiter; SD Main Office; Police President, Magdeburg; also Generalmajor der Polizei. | 289210 | 9 November 1937 | 50648 |
| Karl Brunner | Born 26 July 1900. A German lawyer; head of the Einsatzkommando 4/I during the invasion of Poland; SS-Brigadeführer and Generalmajor of the police and the SS and police leader in Salzburg Austria and Bolzano Italy. Postwar part of the Gehlen Organization. Not prosecuted for war crimes. Died 7 December 1980. | 107161 | June 1934 | 1903386 |
| Ernst Damzog | Born 30 October 1882, Strassburg, France. Involved with the Einsatzgruppen in killing Jews and Poles; also involved in KZ Chelmo killings as well.-died July 1945 Helle. | 36157 | 15 June 1933 | 5081001 |
| Léon Degrelle | Promoted by Himmler to this rank on 2 May 1945 (unofficial)/Commander of the Waffen-SS division "Wallonie" | None | 1 June 1943 | None |
| Christoph Diehm | Born 1 March 1892. SS and Police Leader "Shitomir", "Lemberg" and "Kattowitz", Commander of S.S. Sturmbrigade R.O.N.A.; also Generalmajor der Polizei. Died 11 February 1960 | 28461 | March 1932 | 212531 |
| Hans Döring | SS and Police Leader in "Stalino-Donezgebiet", also Generalmajor der Polizei | 1327 | 6 January 1929 | 106490 |
| Anton Dunckern | Born 29 June 1905. Commander of the Security Police (SiPo) and SD in Occupied Lorraine (Metz); also a Generalmajor der Polizei. From 31 May to 1 July 1953, Dunckern was tried as a war criminal before the Military Court of the 6th Region in Metz; sentenced to 20 years at hard labor. In June 1954, he was granted an early release from a prison; died 9 December 1985. | 3526 | | 315601 |
| Heinz Karl Fanslau | Born 6 June 1909. In January 1934 he became an auditor in the SS Central Administration Office at Munich. On 1 March 1938, he became a member of the SS Special [Purpose] units, which later came to be known as the Waffen-SS. Deputy chief of the WVHA, Brigadier General of the Waffen-SS; "Evidence was introduced that while defendant Fanslau was in command of the supply battalion of the Viking division, which was engaged in the campaign against Russia in the Ukraine, a number of atrocities were perpetrated against the Jews in the vicinity of Tarnopol by the troops under Fanslau's command. The character of this proof has made the Tribunal reluctant to accept it as true beyond a reasonable doubt..."[IMT] in Pohl Trial sentenced to 25 years; reduced to 20 years; commuted to 15 years. Died 10 March 1987 | 13200 | 1 July 1931 | 581867 |
| Ernst Otto Fick | SS-Brigadefürer and Generalmajor der Waffen-SS | 2853 | | 124087 |
| Richard Fiedler | SS and Police Leader "Montenegro"; also Generalmajor der Polizei | 337769 | 1 August 1939 | 33777 |
| Hans Fischböck | Involved in Final Solution in the Netherlands; Secretary of State for economics matters next to the Reich Commissar in the Netherlands | 367799 | | |
| Paul Otto Geibel | SS and Police Leader of the Warsaw district, and a Generalmajor der Polizei. Convicted of war crimes and committed suicide in a Polish prison in 1966. | 313910 | December 1938 | 761353 |
| Dr. Karl Genzken | Chief of Medical Office of the Waffen-SS | 207954 | 5 November 1933 | 39913 |
| Ulrich Graf | A member of Hitler's bodyguards | 26 | | 8 |
| Walter Granzow | Minister-Präsident of Mecklenburg-Schwerin; president of the Deutsche Rentenbank | 128801 | 2 October 1933 | 482923 |
| Ludwig Grauert | State Secretary in the Prussian and Reich Ministry of the Interior | 118475 | 2 June 1933 | 3262849 |
| Wilhelm von Grolman | Born 16 July 1894 SS-Brigadeführer and Generalmajor der Polizei. Died 20 June 1985 | 4130 | | 352864 |
| Wilhelm Günther | SS and Police Leader "Bergvölker-Ordshonikidse"; ,"Rowno" Commander of SiPo and SD in Trieste; also Generalmajor der Polizei | 69638 | 14 March 1933 | 1094209 |
| Leopold Gutterer | State Secretary, Propaganda Ministry; Vice President, Reich Chamber of Culture | 1028 | 1927 | 6275 |
| Desiderius Hampel | Born 20 January 1895. SS Brigadeführer and Generalmajor der Waffen-SS. Died 11 January 1981 | 468174 | May 1942 | |
| Hermann Harm | SS and Police Leader "Dnjepropetrovsk-Kriwoi Rog"; "Litauen" | 21342 | February 1932 | 204385 |
| Ernst Hartmann | SS and Police Leader "Tschernigow", "Shitomir", "Pripet", "Wolhynien-Luzk" | 8982 | 24 October 1930; rejoined 30 April 1937 | 160298 |
| Franz Hayler | Born 29 August 1900 in Schwarzenfeld. He was a German self-employed salesman who rose during the Third Reich to State Secretary and acting Reich Economics Minister as a member of the NSDAP and the SS. He died 11 September 1972 in Aschau im Chiemgau. | 64697 | 23 March 1934 | 754133 |
| Max Henze | Police President in Kassel, Bromberg, Danzig and Essen; also a Generalmajor der Polizei. Hanged in Bydgoszcz, Poland for war crimes, 10 March 1951. | 1167 | 7 June 1927 | 80481 |
| Eberhard Herf | Born 20 March 1887. SS-Brigadeführer and Generalmajor der Polizei. Executed 30 January 1946 war crimes. Cousin of SS Obergruppenführer Maximilian von Herff | 411970 | 9 November 1941 | 1322780 |
| Walther Hewel | Permanent Representative of the Reichsminister for Foreign Affairs to the Führer | | 12 July 1937 | |
| Kurt Hintze | SS and Police Leader "Litauen". Killed in an air raid on 13 November 1944 in Kattowitz. | 282066 | 1 July 1937 | 98200 |
| Franz Josef Huber | Served as chief of the Security Police (SiPo) and SD for Vienna, the "Lower Danube" and "Upper Danube" regions; also a Generalmajor der Polizei | 107099 | 1 May 1937 | 4583151 |
| Heinz Jost | Born 9 July 1904. SD officer and original Chief of the Ausland-SD, Amt VI (Department VI) of the RSHA & Commander of Einsatzkommando A (29 March – 2 September 1942). Tried in Einsatzgruppen Trial of 1947–1948. In 1951, Jost was released from Landsberg prison. He then worked in Düsseldorf as a real estate agent. He died on 12 November 1964 at Bensheim. | 36243 | 25 July 1934 | 75946 |
| Bronislaw Kaminski | Commander of Kaminski Brigade | | | |
| Dr. Adolf Katz | SS-Brigadeführer and Generalmajor der Waffen-SS | 3199 | | 149075 |
| Hans Kehrl | Born 08.09.1900 Brandenburg, Amtschef (Rohstoff- und Planungsamt) in the Reichsministerium für Rüstung und Kriegsproduktion. Died 26 April 1984 in Grafenau-Döffingen | 276899 | 13 September 1936 | 1878921 |
| Wilhelm Keilhaus | Born 11 December 1898. July 1934 involved in the Röhm affair. In July 1943 was appointed inspector for intelligence in the SS Main Command Office. From August 1944 to 1945 he was chief of telecommunications for Reichsminister Himmler. Died 11 January 1977 | 209,060 | 1 April 1934 | 1,399,935 |
| Fritz Kranefuss | Head of Financial Department under Himmler | 53092 | | 964992 |
| Hugo Kraas | Born 25 January 1911. He served in the Leibstandarte SS Adolf Hitler and was the last commander of the SS Division Hitlerjugend. Kraas was investigated for the murder of several dozens of Italian Jews in Italy; he was tried in absentia in Italy in 1955 and was found guilty. The investigation also took place in West Germany in 1965 but stalled for "lack of evidence". Died 20 February 1980 | 289633 | 15 October 1935 | 2204561 |
| Hans Krebs | Honorary Gauleiter; Regierungspräsident, Aussig | 292802 | 1 April 1938 | 86 |
| Christian Peder Kryssing | Highest ranking foreigner in the Waffen-SS. Commander of Frikorps Danmark and SS-Kampfgruppe Küste. | | | |
| Franz Kutschera | SS General and Gauleiter of Carinthia. SS and Police Leader of the Poland's Warsaw district, and a Generalmajor der Polizei. | 19659 | 1 November 1931 | 363031 |
| Ernst Ludwig Leyser | Deputy Gauleiter of Gau Westmark; Generalkommissar "Shitomir"; Landeshauptmann, Province of Nassau | 153 | 28 September 1925; rejoined 1 January 1935 | 5418 |
| Gustav Lombard | SS-Brigadeführer and Generalmajor der Waffen-SS | 185023 | May 1933 | 2649630 |
| Johann-Erasmus Freiherr von Malsen-Ponickau | SS and Police Area Commander, "Istrien"; Police President of Frankfurt am Oder, Posen & Halle | 3914 | 1 March 1930 | 213542 |
| Günther Merk | SS and Police Leader (SSPF) "Charkow"; Commander of Ordnungspolizei in Krakau; also: Generalmajor der Polizei; convicted of war crimes and executed by firing squad in the Soviet Union. | 347133 | 1 November 1939 | 1346722 |
| Kurt Meyer | Waffen-SS division commander of 12th SS Panzer Division Hitlerjugend. | 17559 | 15 October 1931 | 316714 |
| Wilhelm Mohnke | Waffen-SS divisional commander of the LSSAH and (Kommandant) Battle Commander for the defence of the central government district (Zitadelle sector) that included the Reich Chancellery and Führerbunker during the Battle of Berlin | 15541 | 1 September 1931 | 649984 |
| Hinrich Möller | Police Chief in Neumünster; Police Director of Flensburg; SS and Police Leader (SSPF) "Estland". Imprisoned for murder and Kristallnacht atrocities. | 5741 | 15 October 1930 | 113298 |
| Erich Naumann | SS-Brigadeführer and Generalmajor der Polizei; commander of Einsatzgruppe B (November 1941 – March 1943) | 107496 | | 170257 |
| Werner Naumann | State Secretary, Propaganda Ministry; Vice President, Reich Chamber of Culture | 1607 | | 101399 |
| Hans Nieland | Mayor of Dresden | 61702 | | 33333 |
| Walther Oberhaidacher | Gauleiter of Styria; Police President of Bochum and Dresden; Generalmajor der Polizei | 291207 | 30 January 1938 | 50478 |
| Karl Pflaumer | Interior Minister of the state of Baden | 62511 | 1 June 1932 | 186057 |
| Karl Pflomm | SS-Brigadeführer and Generalmajor der Polizei | 2913 | | 304896 |
| Hans Plesch | SS-Brigadeführer and Generalmajor der Polizei; Police President of Munich, 1943–1945 | 4339 | 1 December 1930 | 347695 |
| Anton Reinthaller | Brigadeführer and a member of Reichstag | 292775 | December 1938 | |
| Ernst August Rode | Born 9 August 1894. Served in World War I and postwar in Freikorps Leib-Kurassier-Regiment "Großer Kurfürst" until 25 July 1919 and then became a member of the Schutzpolizei. In December 1939 he was appointed commander of a battalion of the Security Police (Sipo) in Bydgoszcz. He was also deployed in Białystok. He became First General Staff Officer (Ia) to the Commander of the Order Police (BdO) in Norway. At the end of August 1940 he was appointed deputy commander of the Moravian Police Regiment in Brno. From 6 February 1941 to 22 May 1941 he commanded the Police Battalion 315, leading the battalion from April to May 1941 in newly occupied Yugoslavia. From 16 May 1941 he was employed as a Fourth General Staff Officer (Id; responsible for training and organization) and deputy of the First General Staff Officer (Ia) at the Kommandostab Reichsführer-SS in the Hauptamt zur Partisanenbekämpfung. In August 1943 he was temporarily given command of the Latvian SS Volunteer Brigade. In September 1943 he was appointed liaison officer to the command posts of the Wehrmacht on the staff of the Chief of the Gang Fighting Units (BKV), which led the fight against the partisans. He was promoted to SS Brigadeführer and Major General of the Waffen-SS with effect from 21 June 1944. The promotion to Major General of the Schutzpolizei was also set for this date. He was appointed Chief of Staff of Bach-Zelewski as successor to SS-Standartenführer Heinz Lammerding in the summer of 1944, retaining his command as Chief of the Command Staff Reichsführer-SS. Involved in suppression of Warsaw Uprising 1944. Witness in Nuremberg Trials. Died 12 September 1955 Göttingen. | 401,399 | 1 July 1941 | 1,937,929 |
| Dr. Bruno Karl Hermann Rothardt. | Born 21 August 1891 in Danzig, Prussia. SS-Brigadeführer and Generalmajor der Waffen-SS Dr. med. Died on 28 April 1980 Niefern-Öschelbronn. | 276754 | | 430880 |
| Joachim Rumohr | Brigadeführer and Generalmajor of the Waffen-SS | 7450 | 1933 | 216161 |
| Ferdinand von Sammern-Frankenegg | Born 17 March 1897. Reichstag deputy 1938–1944; Führer, 37 SS–Standarte (Linz); Führer, SS–Abschnitt IX (Würzburg); Stabsführer SS–Oberabschnitt Main (Nuremberg); Führer SS–Abschnitt IX; Acting SSPF Warsaw District; Polizeigebietsführer, Esseg; also Generalmajor der Polizei; killed in action, 20 September 1944. | 292792 | December 1932 | 1456955 |
| Karl Schäfer | SS and Police Leader (SSPF) "Weissruthenien"; "Dnjepropetrowsk-Krivoi-Rog". Killed in action, 2 November 1943. | 20865 | October 1931 | 419439 |
| Walter Schellenberg | SD officer and second Chief of the Ausland-SD, Amt VI (Department VI) of the RSHA | 124817 | 10 January 1934 | 3504508 |
| Gustav Adolf Scheel | Police Major General; Leader of the National Socialist Students' Federation, Superior SS and Police Leader in Salzburg, Gauleiter in Salzburg. Leader of the Berlin SD School; Inspector of the Security Police (SiPo) and the SD in Stuttgart; Leader of the Nazi Old Gentlemen's Federation; Chairman of the Reich Student Works; President of the German Study Works for Foreigners; Member of the Reich Labour Chamber and the Reichstag; commander of the SiPo and the SD under Chief of the civil administration in Alsace; Leader of the SD Upper Division South (Munich); Inspector of the SiPo and the SD under the higher SS and Police leaders South and Main; Higher SS and Police leader; Leader of the SS Upper Division Alpenland (Salzburg); Volkssturm Leader | 107189 | 1 October 1931 | 391271 |
| Walter Schieber | Born 13 September 1896. Head of the Armaments Supply Office under Albert Speer. After 1947 employed by the US for ten years in chemical warfare research in West Germany. Died 29 June 1960 | 161947 | June 1933 | 548839 |
| August Schmidthuber | CO of the 7th SS Volunteer Mountain Division Prinz Eugen from 20 January 1944 to 8 May 1945, and the 21st Waffen Mountain Division of the SS Skanderbeg (1st Albanian) from May 1944 onwards. | 266450 | 17 May 1935 | |
| Karl Eberhard Schöngarth | Born 22 April 1903. Commander of Einsatzgruppen b.z.V.; perpetrated the Massacre of Lviv professors, among other atrocities, including the murder of over 10,000 Jews; Wannsee Conference participant; SiPo and SD Commander in the General Government and the Netherlands; executed 16 May 1946 after being found guilty of killing an Allied POW, 21 November 1944 | 67174 | 1 March 1933 | 2848857 |
| Walther Schröder | Born 26 November 1902. Polizeipräsident in Lübeck (1933–1945); SS and Police Leader (SSPF) "Lettland"; "Estland"; involved in killing of Jews in Reichskommissariat Ostland. Died 31 October 1973. | 290797 | 20 April 1938 | 6288 |
| Hinrich Schuldt | Awarded Knight's Cross with Oak Leaves and Swords | | | |
| Erwin Schulz | Born 27 November 1900, Berlin. Chief of Einsatzkommando 5 In May 1941. Sentenced to 20 years in Einsatzgruppen Trial; commuted to 15 years January 1951-released 9 January 1954. Died 11 November 1981. | | 1935 | |
| Hans Schwedler | SS and Police Leader in "Krakau"; Inspector of SS-Totenkopfstandarten; also Generalmajor der Waffen-SS. Suicide 2 May 1945. | 60740 | November 1932 | 455899 |
| Hendrik Seyffardt | Founder of the SS Dutch Legion | | | |
| Franz Six | Chief of Amt VII (Department VII) of the RSHA; charged with creation of Chief of Einsatzgruppen for England; Vorkommando of Moscow of Einsatzgruppe B | 107480 | 1935 | 245679 |
| Sylvester Stadler | Born 30 December 1910. Commander of the SS Division Das Reich, SS Division Hohenstaufen and a recipient of the Knight's Cross with Oak Leaves. Died 23 August 1995 | 139495 | 1933 | 4159018 |
| Franz Walter Stahlecker | Commander of the SS security forces Sicherheitspolizei (SiPo) and the Sicherheitsdienst (SD) for the Reichskommissariat Ostland in 1941–42. Stahlecker commanded Einsatzgruppe A, the most murderous of the four Einsatzgruppen (death squads during the Holocaust) active in German-occupied Eastern Europe. | 73,041 | 1 May 1932 | 3,219,015 |
| Ludwig Steeg | Born 22 December 1894. Mayor of Berlin Germany 1940–1945. Died a POW 6 September 1945 | 127531 | | 1485884 |
| Hyacinth Graf Strachwitz von Groß-Zauche und Camminetz | Heer panzer general | 82857 | | 1405562 |
| Bruno Streckenbach | Born 7 February 1902. Awarded 30 January 1939 Golden Party Badge; Chief of Amt I (Department I), Administration and Personal of the RSHA; and Einsatzgruppen Commander, 8th SS Cavalry Division Florian Geyer. Died 28 October 1977 | 14713 | 1 September 1931 | 489972 |
| Otto Steinbrinck | Freundeskreis der Reichsführer-SS | 63084 | 30 May 1933 | 2638206 |
| Karl Taus | SS and Police Leader "Görz"; headed underground SS forces in Austria, 1934–1937 | 6786 | 27 December 1930 | 301453 |
| Willy Tensfeld | SS and Police Leader "Charkov"; "Stalino-Donezgebiet"; "Oberitalien-West"; also Generalmajor der Polizei | 14724 | 1 September 1931 | 753405 |
| Fritz Tittmann | SS and Police Leader "Nikolajew"; died in unclear circumstances, April 1945 | 2925 | 20 April 1938 | 12225 |
| Wilhelm Trabandt | Colonel of 1 SS Infantry Brigade; Commander of 18th SS Volunteer Panzer Grenadier Division Horst Wessel | 218852 | May 1936 | 7035171 |
| Friedrich Uebelhoer | Born 25 Sept 1893. Governor of the Lodz ghetto until December 1942. Disappeared 1945-fate unknown. | 209059 | | 11707 |
| Edmund Veesenmayer | Special Representative of the Reich in various South East countries. Involved in the Final Solution in Croatia, Serbia and Hungary | 202122 | June 1934 | 873780 |
| Wilhelm Fritz von Roettig | Born 25 July 1888. Generalmajor der Ordnungspolizei. Killed in action Poland 10 September 1939. | | | |
| Jürgen Wagner | Commander of 23rd SS Volunteer Panzer Grenadier Division Nederland. 4th SS Polizei Division | 23692 | 15 June 1931 | 707279 |
| Friedrich Weber | Commander of the NSDAP Old Guard | 265902 | July 1934 | 15 |
| Ernst Heinrich Freiherr von Weizsäcker | Born 25 May 1882. Secretary of State Foreign Office 1938–1943. Died 4 August 1951 | 293291 | 20 April 1938 | 4814617 |
| Karl Maria Wiligut | Section VIII (Archives) RUSHA; Himmler's Personal Staff | | September 1933 | |
| Theodor Wisch | SS-Brigadeführer and Generalmajor der Waffen-SS | 4759 | | 369050 |
| Fritz Witt | First commander of the 12th SS Panzer Division Hitlerjugend. Awarded the Knight's Cross on 4 September 1940. He was killed by an allied naval barrage in 1944. | 21518 | 1 December 1931 | 816769 |
| Karl Emil Wrobel | Born 26 February 1882 Breslau. Held the rank of Generalarzt der Polizei. Surrendered at the Battle of Berlin 2 May 1945. Died 2 October 1949 Shuya, Ivanovo oblast. Note for clarification: he was affiliated with the Ordnungspolizei (Order Police), a separate entity from the SS, although both organizations were under the overarching authority of Heinrich Himmler; so he should not be listed as a member of the SS | | | |
| Gustav Adolf von Wulffen | Born 18 April 1878. Awarded Pour le Merite 21 April 1918. Died of wfpounds 4 May 1945. | 72208 | 1931 | 495764 |
| Lucian Wysocki | Police President in Oberhausen; Mülheim an der Ruhr; Duisburg; Kassel; SS and Police Leader in "Litauen"; also Generalmajor der Polizei | 365199 | 21 June 1940 | 132988 |
| Carl Zenner | Born 11 June 1899. Police President in Aachen; SS and Police Leader "Weissruthenien"; also Generalmajor der Polizei; convicted war criminal. Died 16 June 1969 | 176 | 1 August 1926 | 13539 |
| Paul Zimmermann | SS and Police Leader "Nikolajew"; also Generalmajor der Polizei | 276856 | 1 August 1933 | 940783 |

== SS Officers ==
=== Oberführer (senior colonel) ===
| Name | Position | SS number | Joined SS | Party number |
|---|---|---|---|---|
Oberführer (1926–1945)
| Humbert Achamer-Pifrader | Born 21 November 1900 in Teplitz-Schönau, married Maria Hauser in 1929, joined NSDAP on 10 November 1931, SS-Oberführer and Oberst der Polizei, Einsatzgruppe A Commander (10 September 1942 – 4 September 1943), head of the Gestapo in Darmstadt in 1940, Inspector of the SiPo and SD in Wiesbaden July 1942, Inspector of the SiPo and SD in Berlin September 1943. Died 25 April 1945 in Linz | 275750 | September 1935 | 614104 |
| Josef Altstötter | Member of Reich Ministry of Justice; member of SA # 31; tried 1947 in Judges' Trial-released 1950-died 1979 | 289254 | 15 May 1937 | 5823836 |
| Benno von Arent | Born 19 July 1898 in Görlitz, Prussia. His uncle was Benno von Arent (Generalleutnant). Member of the Freikorps. Joined the Nazi Party in 1932 he was one of the founders of the "Bund nationalsozialistischer Bühnen- und Filmkünstler" ("Union of national-socialist stage and movie artists"), which was renamed "Kameradschaft deutscher Künstler" ("fellowship of German artists") after Hitler's rise to power in 1933. Arent was appointed "Reichsbühnenbildner" ("Reich stage designer") in 1936 and "Reichsbeauftragter für die Mode" ("Reich agent for fashion") in 1939. He designed the diplomatic uniform of the Nazi diplomatic service. In 1944, he was given the rank of SS-Oberführer. Died 14 October 1956 | | 1931 | |
| Adolf Ax | Waffen-SS commander. Chief of Staff of the Commander of the Waffen-SS in The Netherlands 1942–1944 | 3848 | 1 December 1930 | 378043 |
| Hans Christoph Baier | Born 4 November 1893 at Pohl Trial sentenced 10 years. Died 16 March 1969 | 279458 | 1 August 1937 | 2572143 |
| Hermann Baranowski | | | | |
| Werner Blankenburg | Born 19 June 1905 in Caputh. Involved in Nazism "Euthanasia"-program Action T4, the annihilation of the Polish Jews in the "Aktion Reinhard", and the experiments with castration by X-Rays in KZ Auschwitz-Birkenau. Officially declared dead 31 December 1945 in 1956 ironically he actually died under alias Werner Bieleke 28 November 1957 | | | 124744 |
| Walter Bertsch | Minister of Economy and Labour in the Protectorate of Bohemia and Moravia. | | | |
| Friedrich-Wilhelm Bock | He was born 6 May 1897. His military service; 2 August 1914 to 1 February 1919 F.A.R 31.; Alleged to have been member of Freikorps. 10 July 1924....Leutnant {police}; 1 April 1928...Oberleutnant {police}; 1 January 1934...Hauptmann {police}; 1 April 1936...Major {police}; 1 November 1941...Sturmbannführer (joined SS at this rank); 5 January 1942...Obersturmbannführer; Einsatzgruppe B, Sonderkommando 7c Commander (June 1942); 9 November 1943...Standartenführer; 1 August 1944...Oberführer. Commander of 9.SS-Panzer-Division Hohenstaufen, 4.SS-Polizei-Panzergrenadier-Division, 19. Waffen-Grenadier-Division der SS. Died 11 March 1978 Hanover, Germany. | 405821 | | 2223186 |
| Ernst Boepple | SS officer and assistant to Josef Bühler, born as Erwin Hermann Lambert | | | |
| Parseval von Hütten | Born 29.10.1903 Dresden. Participated in executions of Poles and Jews in the Warsaw Ghetto ruins. Sentenced to death by a Polish court after the war and executed on 12 June 1950 | 459 | | |
| Karl-Heinz Bürger | SS and police leader in North Caucasus | 156309 | 30 January 1933 | 68902 |
| Alfred Buntru | Also a hydraulic engineer and informant for the Sicherheitsdienst (SD) | | 1937 | |
| Otto Willy Gerhard Calliebe | Born 1893 at Züllichow. Lt der Flieger-Abteilung 301 1917–18. World War II: Vice Inspector of the NPEA Inspection state offices and SS Oberführer as vice-inspector post, was German high school teacher and Napola leader. Died 20 March 1976 | | 1917 | |
| Prince Christoph of Hesse | Born 14 May 1901. Also, reserve captain at RFSS staff. Luftwaffe major. Killed in airplane accident 7 October 1943 | 35903 | February 1933 | 1498608 or 696176 |
| Karl Diebitsch | Artist and soldier responsible for much of the Third Reich SS regalia. Prof. Diebitsch worked with graphic designer Walter Heck to design the all-black SS uniform. Also with his business partner industrialist Franz Nagy, Diebitsch began the production of art porcelain at the porcelain factory Porzellan Manufaktur Allach. | 141990 | 1 May 1920; November 1933. | 1436 {membership lapsed}, 4,690,956 reinstated. |
| Rudolf Diels | First commander of the Gestapo until April 1934; later Chief of the Regional Government (Regierungspräsident) of Köln | 187116 | April 1934 | 3955308 |
| Eduard Deisenhofer | Waffen-SS combat commander | | | |
| Oskar Dirlewanger | Born 26 Sept 1895; leader of Dirlewanger Brigade; died 7 June 1945 | 357267 | | 1098716 |
| Heinrich Fehlis | Born 1 November 1906 in Wulften am Harz. Was a member of the Einsatzgruppen during Operation Weserübung; commanded the Sicherheitspolizei and Sicherheitsdienst in Norway; died 11 May 1945 in Porsgrunn | 272255 | 1935 | 2862366 |
| Werner Fromm | SS and Police Leader in Bialystok; Police Area Commander in Sarajevo; also Oberst of police and Untersturmführer in the Waffen-SS | 17080 | 15 June 1931 | 753170 |
| Arthur Frank Fuchs | Killed in an RAF air raid on Berlin during the night of 17 January 1943. On the recommendation of his Superior Paul Otto Geibel he was admitted into the SS posthumously during Feb. 43 with effect 21.12.1942 | | 21 December 1942 | |
| Wilhelm Fuchs | Born 1 September 1898. SS-Oberführer and Oberst der Polizei; commander of Einsatzgruppe Serbia and Befehlshaber der Sicherheitspolizei und des SD (BdS) (Serbia) April 1941 – January 1942; Kommandeur of Sicherheitspolizei and of SD in Lithuania; commander of Einsatzkommando 3 (USSR), September 1943 – May 1944; commander of Einsatzgruppe A and BdS (Ostland) in Riga to October 1944; commander Einsatzgruppe E (Croatia). Hanged for war crimes, 24 January 1947 in Belgrade. | 62760 | 1 December 1932 | 1038061 |
| Fridolin Glass | Born 1910. Commander of SS Regiment 89 before outbreak of World War II. Killed in action 1943 | 155767 | April 1934 | 440452 |
| Erich Gritzbach | Chief of the Staff Office, Prussian State Ministry, 1938–1945 | 80,174 | 25 September 1933 | 3,473,289 |
| Paul Heigl | Born 19 April 1887. Generaldirektor der Nationalbiobliothek in Wien 1938–1945. Died 8 April 1945 (suicide). | 310001 | | 6337504 |
| Ernst-Albrecht Hildebrandt | Police President, Hof; Dessau. SS and Police Leader (SSPF) in Central Upper Italy. | 25517 | 1 February 1932 | 1664468 |
| Karl Höfer | Oldest member of SS – born 29 December 1862 | 276338 | | |
| Richard Kaaserer | Born 21 August 1896 in Austria-Hungary. SS and Police leader in Sandžak and Central Norway. Executed by Yugoslavia in January 1947. | 9774 | 15 July 1932 | 1087778 |
| Hubert Klausner | Gauleiter of Carinthia | | | |
| Willi Krichbaum | Post World War II member of the Gehlen Organization | | | |
| Martin Kohlroser | Born 8 January 1905. With 34th SS Volunteer Grenadier Division Landstorm Nederland; commander in the Waffen-SS during World War II who was awarded the German Cross in Gold. Died 14 November 1967 | 3149 | 1 December 1930 | 371577 |
| Erhard Kroeger | Former leader of the National Socialist Group in Estonia. Commander of Einsatzkommando 6/Einsatzgruppe C | 357243 | 23 October 1938 | 7675747 |
| Johannes Georg "Hans" Lörner | Born 6 March 1893. Member of WVHA and brother of Gruppenführer Georg Lörner. In 1947 sentenced to 10 years in prison-released 1951. | 83683 | 1 April 1933 | 2541670 |
| Hans Loritz | KZ commander Esterwegen concentration camp | 4165 | 1 August 1930 | 298668 |
| Emil Maurice | SS Member No. 2, credited with co-founding the SS | 2 | February 1925 | 39 |
| Konrad Meyer-Hetling | Born 15 May 1901. Died 25 April 1973 | 74695 | 20 June 1933 | 908471 |
| Hermann Muhs | Born 16 May 1894. Secretary of State and Minister for Church Affairs (Minister für Kirchenfragen) in Nazi Germany. Died 13 April 1962 | 54420 | 1 June 1931 (Expelled 2 April 1941.) | 152594 |
| Georg Wilhelm Müller | Born 39 December 1909. Assistant to Goebbels in the Propaganda Ministry Aka "Müller-Oslo" [Assigned to Norway]; died 30 April 1989 | 3554 | 1930 | 74380 |
| Thomas Müller | Waffen-SS combat commander | | | |
| Erich Neumann | Born 31 May 1892. State Secretary in the Four Year Plan; Wannsee Conference participant. Arrested after World War II but released because of poor health. Died 23 March 1951 | 222014 | 13 August 1934 | 2645024 |
| Friedrich Panzinger | Born 1 February 1903. Served as the head of Reichssicherheitshauptamt (RSHA) Amt IV A, from September 1943 to May 1944 and the commanding officer of Einsatzgruppe A in the Baltic States and Belarus. From 15 August 1944 forward, he was chief of RSHA Amt V, the Criminal Police (Kriminalpolizei, Kripo), also known as the Reichskriminalpolizeiamt (RKPA). Responsible for the murder of prisoner of war French general Gustave Marie Maurice Mesny on 19 January 1945 near the village of Nossen. Arrested in 1946. Twice sentenced to 25 years of forced labor in Moscow 22 March 1952. Released as a so-called Nichtamnestierter ("non-amnestied") in September 1955 and repatriated to Germany. Member of the German Federal Intelligence Service (Bundesnachrichtendienst, BND) under Reinhard Gehlen. Committed suicide after being arrested for war crimes 8 August 1959 | 322118. | April 1937 | 1017341. |
| Ferdinand Porsche | He made contributions to advanced German tank designs: Tiger I, Tiger II, and the Elefant, as well as the super-heavy Panzer VIII Maus tank, which was never put into production. He also made contributions in aircraft design, including the Junkers Ju 88, and the Focke-Wulf Ta 152. Additionally, he helped develop and manufacture the so-called retaliatory weapons (Vergeltungswaffen), such as the V-1 flying bombs (Fi 103 flying bombs). | None | | 5643287 |
| Heinz Roch | Born 17 January 1905. SS and Police Leader in Crimea, Bialystok District and Northern Norway. Committed suicide in Trondheim 5 May 1945. | 2883 | 19 June 1926 | 34475 |
| Emanuel Schäfer | Commander of Einsatzgruppe II in Poland; Befehlshaber der Sicherheitspolizei und des SD (BdS) in Serbia, January 1942 – October 1944; Commander of Einsatzgruppe K; BdS in northern Italy, January – April 1945 | 280018 | September 1936 | 4659879 |
| Julian Scherner | SS and Police Leader of Kraków | | | |
| Gerhard Markus Schneider | SS lead agent | | | |
| Julius Schreck | First Reichsführer-SS | 5 | February 1925 | 53 |
| Wilhelm Schroeder | Reichstag deputy; Führer of 20th SS-Standarte, then SS-Abschnitt XV; Stabschef of SS-Oberabschnitt Alpenland; Obersturmführer in the Waffen-SS; killed in action. | 261293 | 12 February 1935 | 63277 |
| Emil Sembach | SS headquarters in Silesia killed during the Long knives night in 1934. | 6640 | 1 April 1932 | 3575 |
| Otto Soman | Born 24 October 1899. A member of the SD holding positions such as 1943 inspector of the security police and the SD (IdS) in Wiesbaden and in 1944 he was appointed inspector of the Customs Border Protection for the entire Reich territory and the occupied lands to the deputy chief of Office IV (Gestapo) and inspector general Wilhelm Krichbaum. Postwar served a jail sentence for war crimes. In 1951 recruited as an agent of the Gehlen Organization; he is also suspected of having been a member of the Ministry of State Security [Russian Secret Service]. Died 7 December 1956 | 25638 | 1 November 1931 | 58502 |
| Otto Steinhäusl | Police President of Vienna and Leader of Interpol. | 292773 | 1938 | |
| Paul Gebhard Gustav Werner | Born 4.11.1900. Served in World War I 1918. Also served in SS Security service; also a deputy to Arthur Nebe and Friedrich Panzinger. Involved in the Shoah; SS Oberführer and Oberst Der Polizei. Died 15. Feb 1970 Leinfelden | 290389 | 5 November 1937 | 3025030 |
| Gustav Adolf Wiemann | Waffen-SS Officer and son-in-law of SS-Oberstgruppenführer Paul Hausser | | 1938 | |
| Erwin Weinmann | Commander of Sonderkommando 4a in Ukraine, January – June 1942; chief, RSHA Gestapo Office IV D, March 1941 – January 1942; Befehlshaber der Sicherheitspolizei und des SD (BdS) in Bohemia-Moravia, September 1942 – May 1945 | 280196 | 30 January 1937 | 774436 |
| Arpad Wigand | SS and Police leader (SS- und Polizeiführer (SSPF)) in Warsaw from 4 August 1941 until 23 April 1943. Aide to Erich von dem Bach Zelewski. In 1981, Wigand was found guilty in Hamburg for war crimes and was sentenced to 12.5 years. | 2999 | | 30682 |
| Werner Zschintzsch | State Secretary, Ministry of Science, Education and Culture; Regierungspräsident, Wiesbaden District | 276657 | 16 June 1936 | 3495469 |

=== Standartenführer (colonel) ===
| Name | Position | SS number | Joined SS | Party number |
|---|---|---|---|---|
Standartenführer (1925–1945)
| Humbert Achamer-Pifrader | Born 21 November 1900 Bohemia. Served in Austrian Army in World War I. In 1935 chief of Gestapo in Darmstadt. By July 1942, he was Chief of Security Police and SD in Wiesbaden. In September 1942 he became commander of Einsatzgruppen A, which was responsible for the mass murder of civilians (mostly Jewish). In addition, he was commander of the Security Police (SiPo) in Riga. On 31 August 1943, awarded with the Iron Cross 2nd Class award. In 1944 he returned to the Reich Security Main Office in Berlin and took over as Chief of Security Police in the field units of the Unit IV B. Killed in air raid 21 April 1945 | 275.750 | September 1935 | 614.104 |
| Gunter d'Alquen | Born 24 October 1910. Chief of Propaganda OKW; Editor of Das Schwarze Korps; Commander of the SS-Standarte Kurt Eggers. Died 15 May 1988. | 8452 | 1931 | 66.689 |
| Ludolf Jakob von Alvensleben | Born 9 August 1899. A senior staff member of the Operation Reinhard group assigned by Reichsführer-SS Heinrich Himmler to systematically murder the Jews of Europe. He ended the war as SS and Police Leader (SSPF) of Adria-West, Northern Italy. He escaped investigation after the war and is reported to have died when his car overturned on a road outside Dortmund. Died 23 August 1953 | 52.195 | | 1.313.391 |
| Emil Augsburg | In 1939–40 and again in the summer and fall of 1941 he joined the Security Police to carry out what were called "special duties" (spezielle Aufgaben), a euphemism for executions of Jews and others the Nazis considered undesirable. Augsburg was used by CIC from 1947 to 1948 as an expert on Soviet affairs. Reported died 1981 | 307,925 | 11 September 1938 | 5,518,743 |
| Rudolf Batz | Born 10 November 1903. Lawyer; Gestapo Chief, Hanover; Commander, Einsatzkommando 2; KdS, Kraków; IdS, Wehrkreis VI. Suicide 8 February 1961 | 272458 | 10 December 1935 | 2955905 |
| Paul Blobel | Born 13 August 1894. Einsatzgruppe C, Einsatzkommando 4a Commander (June 1941 – 13 January 1942). Executed 7 June 1951 | 29100 | January 1932 | 844662 |
| Otto Bovensiepen | Born 8 July 1905. Gestapo chief in several cities, including Berlin; Inspector of SiPo and SD in Kassel; Commander of SiPo and SD in Denmark; sentenced to death in 1948; commuted and released in 1953; died 18 February 1979. | 280071 | 1 November 1936 | 35782 |
| Ferdinand Brandner | Born 17 November 1903. An Austrian aerospace designer, responsible for the most powerful turboprop engine ever built, the Kuznetsov NK-12, while interned in the Soviet Union under Operation Osoaviakhim following World War II. Died 20 December 1986 | | | |
| Hans Collani | Born 13 February 1908 in Stettin, died 29 July 1944 at Narva (suicide), Waffen-SS Officer | | | |
| Professor Max de Crinis | Born 29 May 1889. Psychiatric director of the clinic "La charité" of Berlin. Also worked with RuSHA/Action T-4. Suicide 2 May 1945 | 276 171 | 1936 | 688 247 |
| Eugen Dollmann | Served as Himmler's personal representative to the Italian government and the Vatican. Died 1985 | 289259 | | 3 402 541 |
| Erich Ehrlinger | Born 14 October 1910. Einsatzkommando commander. After the end of the war, Ehrlinger went into hiding in Schleswig-Holstein under the alias of Erich Fröscher. In 1950, he moved with his family to Konstanz and worked under a false name as a host in the local casino. In 1952, he married for the second time and started using his real name, and by 1954 worked as a foreman in Volkswagen in Karlsruhe. In December 1958, he was arrested. Two years later Ehrlinger was sentenced by the State Court of Karlsruhe (Landsgericht Karlsruhe) to twelve years imprisonment. The case was appealed and his sentence was officially remitted in 1969, four years after he was released from prison. Died 31 July 2004 | 107493 | May 1935 | 541195 |
| Franz Viktor Eirenschmalz | Born 20 October 1901. At Pohl Trial sentenced to hang-commuted to 9 years | 10.051 | June 1931 | 644.902 |
| Waldemar Fegelein | Born 9 January 1912. Commander of 2nd SS Cavalry Regiment; 8th SS Cavalry Division Florian Geyer; 37th SS Volunteer Cavalry Division Lützow. Brother of Hermann Fegelein. Died 20 November 2000 | 229780 | | 2942829 |
| Jacob Fick | Born 17 January 1912. 22.11.1943-15.09.1944: SS-Stubaf, Kdr, SS-Panzergrenadier-Regiment 37, 17. SS-Panzergrenadier-Division "Götz von Berlichingen". In June 1944 ordered the executions of some 35 to 40 101st Abn Div POWs during the Normandy invasion [This same unit after the Battle of Graignes massacred 44 civilians and a number of prisoners of war taken in the capture of an American aid station, and set fire to the town.]2-4-1945 SS-Staff, Kdr, SS-Panzergrenadier-Regiment 38, 17. SS-Panzergrenadier-Division "Götz von Berlichingen". Apparently not tried after the war. In 1950: changed his name to Jacob Briehl Fick. Died 22 April 2004 | 3.247 | | 153.672 |
| Hermann Florstedt | Born 18 February 1895. Commandant of Majdanek Concentration Camp. Executed 15 April 1945 | 8660 | 1931 | 488 573 |
| Karl Gesele | Born 15 August 1912. With 16th SS Panzergrenadier Division Reichsführer-SS and 37th SS Volunteer Cavalry Division Lützow. Died 8 April 1968 | 10,596 | August 1931 | |
| Hans Friedemann Götze | Born 3 November 1897. Son of SS Brigadeführer Friedemann Götze. Commander of SS Heimwehr Danzig KIA 3 May 1940 | | | |
| Herbert Richard Golz | SS commander of security in occupied Montenegro | 357154 | | |
| Jakob Grimminger | Born 25 April 1892. Member of SS-Standarte 1 and bearer of the Blutfahne. Died 28 January 1969 | 135 | 25 February 1926 | 759 |
| Kurt Gruber | Born 21 October 1904 in Syrau, Vogtland – died 24 December 1943 in Dresden. He was a Nazi politician and from 1926 to 1931 the first chairman of the Hitler Youth (Hitler-Jugend or HJ). | | | 7270 |
| Max Hansen | Born 31 July 1908. Commander of the 1st SS Panzer Grenadier Regiment in the Leibstandarte SS Adolf Hitler. Died 7 March 1990 | 27813 | 1931 | 478376 |
| Heinrich Heim | Born 15 June 1900; one of three compilers of Hitler's Table Talk Died 26 June 1988 | | | 1782 |
| Gebhard Ludwig Himmler | Born 29 July 1898. Brother of Heinrich Himmler. Died 1982 | 214.049 | 30 January 1944 | 1.117.822 |
| Peter Högl | Reichssicherheitsdienst deputy commander | 249998 | | 3289992 |
| Franz Joseph, Prince of Hohenzollern-Emden | Born 1891. Expelled from SS November 1944. Died 1964. | 276 691 | 1933 | 3765580 |
| Walter Huppenkothen | Born 31 December 1907. Died 5 April 1978 | 126785 | 1 May 1933 | 1950150 |
| Erich Georg Heinrich Isselhorst | Born 5 February 1906. An Einsatzkommando leader; held posts within the Gestapo and SS in Cologne, Munich, Stuttgart and Strasbourg. Executed 23 February 1948 | 267,313 | October 1934 | 1,269,847 |
| Karl Jäger | Born 20 September 1888. Commander of Einsatzkommando 3/Einsatzgruppe A. Author of the infamous Jäger Report. Died 22 June 1959 | 62823 | 1932 | 359269 |
| Vilis Janums | Born 7 January 1894. Commander in the 15th Waffen Grenadier Division of the SS (1st Latvian). Died 6 August 1981 | | | |
| Rudolf Lange | Born 18 April 1910. SiPo and SD Commander, Latvia; Commander, Einsatzkommando A-2; Wannsee Conference participant; SiPo and SD Commander, Wartheland. Died 23 February 1945 | 290,308 | 30 September 1937 | 4,922,869 |
| Michael Lippert | Born 24 April 1897. Killed SA leader Ernst Röhm July 1934. SS-Totenkopf Officer then Commander of the NCO School of the Waffen-SS in Arnhem (the Netherlands). In 1957, he was sentenced to 18 months in prison by a West German court for his part in Röhm's murder. Died 1 September 1969 | 2 968 | 10 March 1931 | 246 989 |
| Enno Lolling | Born 19 July 1888. Concentration Camps Inspectorate; Physician with Amt D III of the SS-Wirtschafts-Verwaltungshauptamt for Medical Services and Camp Hygiene, with headquarters at Oranienburg. Died 27 May 1945 | 179,765 | 28 August 1933 | 4,691,483 |
| Josef Albert Meisinger | Born 14 September 1899. The Butcher of Warsaw as Commander of the Security Police and SD. Tried and executed 7 March 1947 | 36134 | 5 March 1933 | 3201697 |
| Rudolf Mildner | Born 7 July 1902. The chief of the Gestapo at Katowice and was the head of the political department at Auschwitz, conducting "third degree" methods of interrogation from March 1941 until September 1943. As such, he frequently sent prisoners to Auschwitz for incarceration or execution. He visited Auschwitz on several occasions. In December 1944, he was appointed inspector of the SiPo, Gestapo and SD in Vienna. After the war, Mildner testified at the Nuremberg Trials and remained in custody until released in 1949. Post War fate unknown; according to CIA report was allowed to escape to South America. | 275.741 | 1935 | 614.080 |
| Erich Mix | Born 27 June 1898 Trzcińsk. Served in World War I and World War II. Also Mayor of Settina and Wiesbaden. Died 9 April 1971 | 132400 | 1 September 1933 | 1.334.064 |
| Professor Dr. Wilhelm Pfannenstiel | Born 12 February 1890. SS physician at Bełżec and Auschwitz. After the war he was interned by the Americans until 1950. Died 1 November 1982. | 273083 | 1934 | 2828629 |
| Joachim Peiper | Born 30 January 1915. Waffen-SS Commander of LSSAH Kampfgruppe Peiper (the unit involved in the Malmedy massacre) (branch: Panzertruppe). Sentenced to execution in 1946; sentence commuted and released in 1956. Killed by person or persons unknown 14 July 1976. | 132496 | 16 Oct 1933 | |
| Heinrich Petersen | Commander of 18th SS Volunteer Panzer Grenadier Division Horst Wessel | 134.299 | | 964.574 |
| Ruediger Pipkorn | Born 19 November 1909. 1945 commander of 35th SS and Police Grenadier Division. Killed 25 April 1945 | | | |
| Walther Rauff Vanghøj | Born 19 June 1906. Spearheaded gas van engineering. Member of the BND 1958-1962. Protected by his friend Augusto Pinochet. Died 14 May 1984 | 290.947 | January 1938 | 5.216.415 |
| Alfons Rebane | Born 24 June 1908. Awarded Knight's Cross of the Iron Cross. Nicknamed "Estonian Rommel". Postwar worked for MI6 and involved in Operation Jungle. Died 8 March 1976 | | | |
| Karl Raddatz | Chief of Staff to SS-Obergruppenführer and General der Waffen-SS and the Polizei Karl Gutenberger. Involved in "Operation Carnival" March 1945 which resulted in death of Dutch Border Guard Jozef Saive and Aachen Mayor Franz Oppenhoff. 22.10.1949 is also accused by the jury court of the Aachen Regional Court for aiding and abetting manslaughter in combination with crimes against humanity sentenced to 4 years in prison and 3 years of loss of honour. On 22.09.1952 sentence commuted to 18 months | | | |
| Sverre Riisnæs | Born 6 Nov 1897. Minister of Justice Quisling Government of Norway. Died 21 June 1988 | | | |
| Arthur Rödl | KZ Commander -Gross-Rosen concentration camp; Buchenwald concentration camp; | 1.240 | 1928 | 98.023 |
| Martin Sandberger | Born 17 August 1911. Commanded Sonderkommando 1a. Commander of Sicherheitspolizei and Sicherheitsdienst in Estonia. Arrested and sentenced to death in 1947. Sentence commuted by West German courts in 1958 and Sandberger released. Died 30 March 2010 | 272,495 | 1936 | 774,980 |
| Rudolf Scheide | Born 24 December 1908. Acquitted at Pohl Trial | 2.351 | 1930 | 93.508 |
| Max Schimmelpfennig | Born 25 February 1896. Commander of SS-Unterführerschule Posen-Treskau 1 May 1943 – fall 1943. Commander of SS- und Waffen-Unterführerschule Laibach fall 1943 – 17 February 1945. Died 12 September 1982 | 422.167 | | 3.683.016 |
| Otto Schnebel | Born 20.11.1886; Iron Cross World War I; 01.10.42 - 15.03.43: SS-Führer in Stab SS-OA "Ost" (Krakau.); 17.11.42 (until including 1.11.42) SS-Fachführer in Stabskompanie b.HSSPF "Ost"; 22.07.42 - 19.9.1943 head of Personalbüro Arbeitsstab Warschau der Allgemeine-SS and Stabsführer SS and Polizeiführer Warschau; KVK 2.Kl. engineering officer who served in this capacity in Warsaw; 5.03.43 - 1945: SS-Führer b. SS-OA "Spree" (Berlin). 1946 in CIE Ludwigburg | | 19.02.1932 | |
| Walter Schuhmann | Born 3 April 1898. Head of the National Socialist Factory Cell Organization. Member of the Prussian State Council. Reichstag member. Died 2 December 1956 | 347,116 | 1 November 1939 | 19,874 |
| Gregor Schwartz-Bostunitsch | Born 1 December 1883. In 1935 he worked in Department II 111 of the SD Main Office, where, as an alleged specialist on Jews, Freemasonry, subversive sects and Bolshevism, he was responsible for setting up a Freemason museum. At the beginning of 1945, Bostunić was still alive, and in mid-March he was in Bad Harzburg. The last mention of him dates back to May 1946, when he was included in the list of war criminals by the General Staff of the American occupation forces. | 107,481 | 1932 | 859,390 |
| Heinrich Seetzen | Born 22 June 1906. Lawyer and Gestapo officer. Commanded Sonderkommando 10a, Inspector of SiPo and SD in Kassel and Breslau, commanded Einsatzgruppe B. Died 28 September 1945 (suicide) | 267,231 | 15 February 1935 | 2,732,725 |
| Wolfram Sievers | Born 10 July 1905. Himmler's personnel Staff; General Secretary of the Ahnenerbe; Deputy of Managing Board of Directors of Reich Research Council. Executed 2 June 1948 | 275325 | 1935 | 144983 |
| Josef Spacil | Born 3 January 1907. SS economist at the Higher SS and Police Leader office for southern Russia. Chief of Section II RSHA. Died 8 June 1967 | 6797 | 10 April 1931 | 1,200,941 |
| Eugen Steimle | Commanded Sonderkommando 7a and Einsatzkommando 4a. | 272,575 | 1932 | 1075555 |
| Günther Tamaschke | Born 26 February 1896. Commandant of the Lichtenburg and Ravensbrück concentration camps. Died 14 October 1959 | 851 | 1927 | 36,978 |
| Hilmar Wäckerle | First commandant of Dachau concentration camp | 9.729 | 1 March 1931 | 530.715 |
| Josef Witiska | Kommandeur SiPo and SD, Galicia District; Befehlshaber SiPo and SD, Slovakia; Commander Einsatzgruppe H. Suicide, 16 October 1946. | 422296 | 1 March 1938 | 6289103 |
| Ernst Woermann | Born 30 March 1888. On 11 April 1949 Woermann was sentenced to 7 years in prison. On 12 December, it was lowered to 5 years. However, he was released early in 1950 or 1951. Died 5 July 1979. | | | 4.789.453 |
| Wilhelm Zander | Born 22 April 1911. Was an adjutant to Martin Bormann. Died 27 September 1974. | 27789 | | 552659 |

=== Obersturmbannführer (lieutenant colonel) ===
| Name | Position | SS number | Joined SS | Party number |
|---|---|---|---|---|
Obersturmbannführer (1933–1945)
| Fritz Arlt | Born 12 April 1912. Died 21 April 2004 | | | 1.376.685 |
| Georg Betz | Born 15 June 1903. SS officer who served as Adolf Hitler's personal co-pilot and Hans Baur's substitute. Died 2 May 1945 | 625419 | 1932 | |
| Helmut Bischoff | Gestapo chief of Poznań and Magdeburg; director of security for the V-weapons program | 272403 | November, 1935 | 203122 |
| Johannes Karl Bernhard Bobermin | Born 1 October 1903 at the Pohl trial sentenced to 20 years – reduced to 15 years. Died February 1960 | 139.845 | September 1933 | 2.633.234 |
| Dr. Otto Bradfisch | Einsatzgruppe B, Einsatzkommando 8 commander (June 1941 – 1 April 1942) | 310810 | 26 September 1938 | 405869 |
| Werner Braune | Commanded Einsatzkommando 11b/Einsatzgruppe Special Purpose Unit D. | 107,364 | November 1934 | 581,277 |
| Fritz Darges | Born 8 February 1913. With 2nd SS Panzer Division Das Reich and 5th SS Panzer Division Wiking. Died 25 October 2009 | 72.222 | 1 April 1933 | 4.166.936 |
| Léon Degrelle | Born 15 June 1906. Belgian Waffen-SS Foreign Legion Commander. Died 31 March 1994 | None | 1 June 1943 | None |
| Joachim Karl Paul Nikolaus Deumling | Born 25 January 1910. Head of Unit IV D 2 (General Government Affairs in the Reich) in the Reich Security Main Office (RSHA) and Headed Einsatzkommando 10b as SS-Obersturmbannführer und Oberregierungsrat [March 1943-January 1945] in Croatia; postwar worked for the British Army of the Rhine after the war, but the British blacklisted him for security reasons in 1951; became Intelligence Adviser for Egypt President Gamal Abdel Nasser Arrested on 26 June 1967 in RSHA Trial; released in December 1968. Investigated in 1969 for aiding and abetting the murder of at least 3,823 people (investigations did not lead to an indictment and trial). Died 2 April 2007 | 187.708 | | 1.942.286 |
| Fritz Dietrich | Born 6 August 1898. SS police chief (SS und Polizei Standortführer ) in Liepāja (German:Libau), Latvia. Postwar tried and executed 22 October 1948 | 280034 | May 1936 | 2674343 |
| Hermann Dohna-Finckenstein | Deputy District Administrator, Rosenberg Kreis | 102880 | 1 November 1931 | 808228 |
| Adolf Eichmann | Born 19 March 1906. Head of the Gestapo's Sub-Office of Resettlement and later head of the Office of Jewish Affairs under RSHA Amt IV Gestapo and officially known as sub-department, Referat IV B4. Tried and found guilty of war crimes and hanged 1 June 1962 | 45326 | 1 April 1932 | 889895 |
| Alfred Karl Wilhelm Filbert | Born 8 September 1905. Leader of Einsatzkommando 9 (EK 9) in Einsatzgruppe B (EGr B) in June 1941, arrested August 1959. Sentenced to life; request for revision rejected April 1963; fired for liability April 1975. Died 1 August 1990. | | August 1932 | |
| Hans Fleischhacker | Born 10 March 1912. SS-Rasse- und Siedlungshauptamt. Died 30 January 1992 | 307399 | 1940 | 7501920 |
| Alfred Franke-Gricksch | Born 30 November 1906 in Berlin. Executed 18 August 1952 in Moscow. | | 1935 | |
| Dr. Otto Furrer | Born 7 August 1910. Psychology researcher with the NSDStB. He went on to join the SS in October 1935. He became a research leader in human experiments involving information extraction. | | 5 October 1935 | 3500544 |
| Bruno Gesche | 4th Commander of the SS-Begleitkommando des Führers 1934–1945 | 1093 | 1927 | 8592 |
| Werner Göttsch | Born 23 October 1912 in Kiel; died 2 May 1983 in Kiel | 10.238 | 15 March 1931 | 459,389 |
| Fritz Hartjenstein | Commandant at Birkenau, Natzweiler concentration camp, Flossenbürg | | | |
| Karl Hass | Born 5 October 1912. Joined SD 1934. Involved in deportation of 1,000 Jews to KZ Auschwitz; placed Princess Mafalda of Savoy in German custody. Involved in Ardeatine massacre. Postwar used by US to Spy on USSR; sentenced to life in prison in 1988; died under house arrest 21 April 2004 | 117557 | | 4583147 |
| Werner Haase | Born 2 August 1900. Hitler's Personal physician. Died 30 November 1950 while a POW of USSR | 254.097 | 1 April 1941 | 3.081.672 |
| Johan Bastiaan van Heutsz Jr. | Born 1 October 1882, The Hague, Netherlands. Highest ranking Dutch Waffen-SS member. Served in 5. SS-Pz.Div. 'Wiking', 'Landwacht Nederland', 4. SS-Freiw.Pz.Gren.Brig. 'Nederland', Indische Legion. Died 25 April 1945 (probably). | 393343 | 13 June 1941 | |
| Georg Albert Wilhelm Heuser | Born 27 February 1913; Chief of the KDS [Gestapo] Minsk. Died 30 January 1989 | | | |
| Fritz Hippler | Film producer of The Eternal Jew | 284122 | 10 April 1937 | 62133 |
| Wilhelm Höttl | Born 19 March 1915. RSHA Head of Counter Intelligence for Central and Southeastern Europe; second in command to Himmler's representative in Hungary. "Höttl was released from confinement in December 1947 and the US Army refused his extradition to the Austrian People's Courts, which at the time took action against Nazi perpetrators. In March 1948 he got in contact with the CIC and became subsequently control chief of two espionage operations, namely "MOUNT VERNON" and "MONTGOMERY". His task was to conduct espionage against the Communist Party of Austria and Soviet activities in the Soviet-occupied part of Austria. Höttl was described by the CIC as "an excellent source for ideas, both concrete and theoretical, on the expansion of American Intelligence in Austria". Died 27 June 1999 | 309510 | 1938 | 6309616 |
| Rudolf Höss | Commander of Auschwitz concentration camp | 193616 | 20 September 1933 | 3240 |
| Paul-Werner Hoppe | Born 28 February 1910, he was the commandant of Stutthof concentration camp from September 1942 until April 1945. Died 15 July 1974. | 116695 | 1933 | 1596491 |
| Maximilian Viktor Jesuiter | Born Szczecin; involved in Warsaw Ghetto Uprising April–May 1943. Executed by the Soviets in Minsk (Bielorussia) on 06 II 1948 | | 1932 | |
| Kurt Georg Jurgschait | Head of security in Grini detention camp at Norway | | | |
| Dr. Ernest Marcel Kah | Born in Baden-Baden, Germany; became NSDAP member 1 Sept 1932 | 290543 | 1 August 1937 | 1298873 |
| Vinzenz Kaiser | Born 28 February 1904 Waltersdorf, Austria. An "Old Guard" NSDAP member. Formed SA troop in 1927. 1934 fled Austria and joined SS Austrian Legion (Adolf Eichmann was also a member of this unit). 1931 member of SS with rank of Sturmführer. Member of LSSAH. 1938 part of Anschluss-company commander in SS Regiment Der Führer later part of 2nd SS Panzer Division Das Reich. Also member of 16th SS Panzergrenadier Division Reichsführer-SS and 17th SS Panzergrenadier Division Götz von Berlichingen. Awarded Knight's Cross of the Iron Cross. Died while a POW 19/20 April 1945 | 17127 | 10 October 1931 | 54828 |
| Herbert Kappler | Born 23 September 1907. Commander of SS and Police Forces in Rome, Italy. In prison from 1948 until escape 1977; died 9 February 1978 | 55211 | 8 May 1933 | 594899 |
| Erich Kempka | Born 16 September 1910. Hitler's chauffeur and an original member of SS-Begleitkommando des Führers. Died 24 January 1975 | 2803 | 1 April 1930 | 225639 |
| Max Kiefer | Born 15 September 1889, served as SS officer. At Pohl Trial sentenced to life-commuted to 20 years. Died 21 February 1974 | | | |
| Horst Klein | Born 27 February 1910. Acquitted Pohl trial | 114.488 | April 1933 | 2.167.516 |
| Max Koegel | Section Commander at Auschwitz | 1254463 | 4 March 1936 | 215.123 |
| Johannes König | SS-RSHA. | 452.432 | | |
| Dr. Eduard Krebsbach | Born 8 August 1894; served 1940 in 3rd SS Panzer Division Totenkopf; stationed at KZ Mauthausen and KZ Kaiserwald; executed for war crimes 28 May 1947 | 106 821 | 1933 | 4 142 556 |
| Herbert Kuhlmann | Born 17 April 1915; at various times served in 2nd SS Panzer Division Das Reich, and the 1st SS Panzer Division Leibstandarte SS Adolf Hitler. Also commanded a Kampfgruppe of the 12th SS Panzer Division Hitlerjugend; escaped to Argentina after the war and while there assisted Adolf Eichmann in his efforts to avoid capture. | 118 826 | | 3 101 992 |
| Bodo Lafferentz | On staff of the SS "Race and Settlement Central Agency". Later involved in researching oil shale sites and wind power also V-2 Rocket development. Organised the Bayreuth opera "War Festival". | 347155 | 17 February 1939 | 2594441 |
| Arthur Liebehenschel | Commandant of the Majdanek and Auschwitz death camps, succeeding Rudolf Höss. Served as an adjutant in the Columbia and Lichtenburg camps, Inspectorate of Concentration Camps, and as a senior director in the SS Main Economic and Administrative Office. Prosecuted in the Auschwitz Trial in Kraków and executed by hanging on 28 January 1948. | 29254 | 1 February 1932 | 932760 |
| Heinz Linge | Born 23 March 1913. Hitler's valet 1935–1945. Died 9 March 1980 | 35795 | 1932 | 1.260.490 |
| Kurt Lischka | Born 16 August 1909. Tried 1979 with Herbert Hagen and Erich Heinrichsohn. Died 16 May 1989 | 195590 | 1 June 1933 | 4583185 |
| Franz Maierhofer | Party Gauleiter, 1930–1933. Wehrmacht from 1937. Killed in action at Kharkov, 1943. | 250105 | 1 November 1933 | 59524 |
| Knud Børge Martinsen | Commander of Frikorps Danmark | | | |
| Marko Jesper Matošević | Croat. Commander and overseer of Livac-Zapolje, Usora-Soli and Posavje provinces. Tasked with defense of food supply lines against Yugoslav Partisan paramilitary and suppressing communist rebellion, former spy. Suspected to have migrated to Argentina by the end of the war in 1945 or defecting to Bleiburg, Austria. | 802001 | 1 August 1937 | |
| Gerhard Kurt Maywald | Born 16 April 1913. Involved with Maly Trostenets extermination camp. Settled after the war in West Germany. In 1970, the public prosecutor's office in Koblenz ended an investigation against him "because of the absence of sufficient evidence of guilt". On 4 August 1977 Maywald was sentenced to four years imprisonment for murder and complicity involving 8,000 Jews in Latvia. Date of death unknown | | | |
| Ain-Ervin Mere | Born 22 February 1903; died 5 April 1969 | | | |
| Brunon Müller-Altenau | Born 13 September 1905. Gestapo and Einsatzkommando Ek2. Tried 1947 sentenced to 20 years; released 1952. Died 1 March 1960. | | | |
| Kunz Andreas Emil Karl Mummenthey | Born 11 July 1906 at Pohl Trial sentenced to life-commuted to 20 years. Released 18 December 1953 | 221.079 | 1934 | 4.302.359 |
| Jakob Nagel | State Secretary in the Reich Postal Ministry and head of the Postschutz; NSKK-Gruppenführer | | 1942 | 1,277,955 |
| Gustav Adolf Nosske | Head of Aachen Gestapo in 1935 and head of Frankfurt Gestapo 1936–1941. Head of Einsatzkommando 12 from 1941 to 1942. In April 1942 Nosske joined the RSHA office in Berlin concerning the Occupied Eastern Territories. In 1943 he was appointed head of the "Foreigners and Enemies of the State" division of the Gestapo. From August 1943 to September 1944 he was head of the state police in Düsseldorf. On 10 April 1948 Nosske was sentenced to life imprisonment for war crimes. In 1951 his sentence was commuted to ten years in prison. | | 1933 | |
| Rudolf Oebsger-Röder | Born March 1912. SD-Leader at Einsatzkommando 16 Bromberg, 1940 Head of The Office Group II A (Basic Research) in Office II (SD-Inland) of the Reich Security Main Office (RSHA), leader of the Einsatzkommando Cluj in Hungary 1944; arrested 1946 and sentenced to 18 months in prison in November 1948 (not carried out because he had already served time in an internment camp). Recruited 1948 as employee of the Gehlen Organization/Federal Intelligence Service [Relieved from duties summer 1964]; investigated but not charged for war crimes. Was a correspondent in D.K. Died 21 June 1992 | 267.393 | April 1935 | 475.061 |
| Hermann Pook | Born 1 May 1901. Obersturmbannführer of the Waffen-SS, chief dentist of the WVHA. At Pohl Trial-sentenced to 10 years. Reported to have died 1983 | 155.870 | 1 June 1933 | 2.045.1140 |
| Karl Rabe | Born 11.06.1905; Muehlhausen. Became member of NSDAP 1 June 1930 | 54628 | 1 June 1932 | 259544 |
| Karl Rasche | Head of Dresdner Bank; sentenced 1949 in Ministries Trial to serve 7 years; released 1950. Died 1951 | 323.879 | May 1939 | 2.207.508 |
| Harald Riipalu | Born 13 February 1912. Estonian member of the SS. Died 4 April 1961 | | | |
| Franz Schädle | Last commander of Hitler's personal bodyguard unit (SS-Begleitkommando des Führers) | 2605 | 1 February 1930 | 73.203 |
| Christian Frederik von Schalburg | Commander of Frikorps Danmark | | | |
| Hermann Schaper | Born 12 August 1911. Commander of Kommando SS Zichenau-Schroettersburg and Einsatzgruppe B. In 1976 sentenced to six years in prison but released for medical reasons. | 3484 | | 105606 |
| Konrad Schellong | Born 7 February 1910. Joined SA 1932; service (in SS Special Command "Saxony" [SS-Sonderkommando "Sachsen"], later SS Guard Unit "Saxony" [SS-Wachverbande "Sachsen"] and SS Death's Head Unit "Saxony" [SS-Totenkopfverbaende "Sachsen"]), concentration camp (Konzentrationslager – KL) Sachsenberg 1934–1936; service, SS Death's Head Regiment "Upper Bavaria" (SS-TV Standarte "Oberbayern") at KL Dachau (on 1 Dec 1937 and on 1 Mar 1938) until late 1939; service, SS-Division "Wiking" to Jul 1942; commander, SS Volunteer Legion "Flanders" (Kdr. SS-Freiwilligen-Legion "Flandern") 11 or 14 Jul 1942-May 1943; commander, SS Volunteer Assault Brigade "Langemarck" (Kdr. SS-Freiwilligen-Sturmbrigade "Langemarck") 31 May-19 Oct 1944; commander, 27th SS Volunteer Grenadier Division "Langemarck" (Kdr. 27.SS-Freiwilligen-Grenadier-Division "Langemarck") (on 19 Oct 1944) [Knights Cross 1945] Served "...as a guard and later commander at the Sachsenburg and Dachau Nazi death camps from 1934 to 1939". Moved to Chicago IL after the war; became US citizen 1962; complaint filed against him by US Justice Department Office of Special Investigations (OSI) 17 Mar 1981; put on trial 25 May-4 Jun 1982; US Citizenship revoked 9 Sept 1982 (NYT 10 Sept 1982:14:6); appeal filed 1 May 1983; decided in favor of U.S. Govt. 24 Aug 1983; deportation charges filed by OSI 8 Dec 1983; decision on appeal pending as of Sept 1984; verdict upheld by Seventh Circuit court Oct 1986; Supreme Court refused to review Apr 1987 (NYT 7 Apr 1987:II:2:1; NYT 24 Apr 1987:6:4); deportation to West Germany announced 23 Sept 1988 (NYT 8 Oct 1982:10:1; NYT 24 Sept 1988:6:6; ABR-SS; Schellong v. INS, 547 F. Supp. 569; Schellong v. INS, 717 F.2d 329; Schellong v. INS, 805 F.2d 655; cert. denied Schellong v. INS, 465 U.S. 1007; Dienstaltersliste der Waffen-SS [1 Jul 1944]). Deported to West Germany in 1988, where he died 7 February 1992 | 13553 | | |
| Heinz Schubert | Born 27 August 1914. Defendant in Einsatzgruppen Trial, sentenced to death-commuted to 10 years. Died 17 August 1987 | 107326 | 10 October 1934 | 3474350 |
| Richard Schulze | Born 20 Sept 1898. Head of the Gestapo in Darmstadt. 1937 he became head of the Kriminalpolizei von Gleiwitz. In September 1939, he was assigned to the Stab der Einsatzgruppe II in Poland, after which he served as head of the Kriminalpolizei in Kattowitz and since 1941 active in Königsberg (Prussia). In August 1942 he held the rank of an Oberregierungsrat as Kriminalrat and group leader in the Reichskriminalpolizeiamt. There, in Amt V he led the Gruppe C (deputiy Kurt Amend), which, among other things, searched for escaped prisoners of war, and he also served as liaison officer between the RSHA and the head of the prisoner of war administration. Died 29 Dec 1969 | | 1938 | 4.705.801 |
| Richard Schulze; A.k.a. Richard Schulze-Kossens | Born 2 October 1914, Berlin. Germany. Commander of SS Officers School Bad Tölz, Bavaria. Died 3 July 1988 Düsseldorf, Germany | | November 1934 | 264.059 |
| Johann Schwarzhuber | Born 29 August 1904. Connected with KZ Dachau and KZ Auschwitz. Executed 3 May 1947 | 142.388 | 8 April 1933 | 1.929.969 |
| Ilya Shavykin | Executed with Bronislav Kaminski 28.08.1944 | | | |
| Hans Siegling | Born 24. Feb 1912. Joined the Nazi Party and the Sturmabteilung in 1930. In 1932 he began his service with the security police. Eventually, he resigned from the party and the SA in the same year, only to rejoin on May 1, 1933 after Adolf Hitler's rise to power. In May 1941, he applied for membership in the SS, and was eventually accepted on November 25, 1941 and was given the rank of Hauptsturmführer. During the Second World War, the 1st Company of Reserve Police Battalion 3, which he commanded, participated in numerous mass shootings of Jews and civilians by the Einsatzkommandos of Einsatzgruppe B. At this time, Siegling also established Schutzmannschaft Battalion 57, which was deployed for anti-partisan operations and participated in the depopulation of entire regions. In February 1943 members of the 57th Auxiliary Police Battalion under Hans Siegling were involved in a massacre of Jews and Russian Partisans in February 1943 in a cowshed in Salihorsk, Belarus. In 1944, he was promoted to SS-Sturmbannführer and on August 14, 1944 to SS-Obersturmbannführer and to lieutenant colonel of the police. In 1944, he was appointed commander of the 30th Waffen Grenadier Division of the SS. Died 25 December 1997. On 11 August 1973, a military court in Minsk sentenced 4 Belarusian members of the 57th Battalion to death for killing the partisans. Those tried were Iwan Melnikowitsch, Pjotr Kutusow, Nikolai Skrobez, Iwan Chlebowitsch. | 450,683 | 25 November 1941 | 3279337 |
| Walter Sohst | SD Section III | | | |
| Eduard Strauch | Born 17 August 1906 Commander of Einsatzkommando 2, then commander of two Nazi organizations, the Security Police (German:Sicherheitspolizei), or SiPo, and the Security Service (German:Sicherheitsdienst, or SD, first in Belarus (then called White Russia or White Ruthenia) and later in Belgium. In October 1944, he was transferred to the Waffen-SS. Died 15 September 1955 in prison hospital. | 19.312 | December 1931 | 623.392 |
| Dr. Harold Strohschneider | Born 1 June 1907 Graz, Austria. Physician. Wounded in Rommel Campaign. SS Obersturmführer 20 April 1944. Postwar moved to Arusha, Tanzania where he lived in the 1960s. Died Natural causes [Cancer]. His widow Otti returned to Austria where she also died. | 309484 | | |
| Dr Walter Strohschneider | Born 6 October 1908. Drahowitz, Suddenland. Member of the SD. SS Obersturmführer; 20 April 1942. Between July 1942 and March 1943, SS-Ostuf Walter Strohschneider was initially assigned to EK 12 (EGr D) as commander of Teilkommando "Budennowsk", and then Leiter SIPO/SD Außenstelle "Wladimir Wolynsk". In April 1944 he was assigned to Einsatzgruppe "F" in Hungary, and between May 25 and June 6 he led the liquidation of the Cluj (Kolozsvar) ghetto. In May 1945 during Battle of Berlin he was "missing" fate unknown. | 328862 | | 6459693 |
| Dr. Ludwig Stumpfegger | Born 11 July 1910. Worked under Dr. Karl Gebhardt with Dr. Fritz Fischer and Dr. Herta Oberheuser in medical experiments on human subjects from Ravensbrück. Hitler's personal surgeon from 1944, forward. Some sources report that he helped Magda Goebbels kill her children as they slept in the Vorbunker on 1 May 1945. Died 2 May 1945 while trying to flee Berlin | 83.668 | 2 June 1933 | 3.616.119 |
| Friedrich Suhr | Department Head in Adolf Eichmann's Referat IV B4; Commander of SS-Sonderkommando 4b & Einsatzkommando 6; Commander of SiPo & SD, France; SS and Police Leader, "Oberelsaß" | 65824 | 1 February 1933 | 2623241 |
| Heinz Tensfeld | Born 11 May 1919. SS-Hstuf and Chef, 8./Pz.Rgt.2 in Nov 1943. Killed 16 Nov 1943 at Gralimki | 400139 | | |
| Anton Thernes | Born 8 February 1892. Commandant of KZ Majdanek. Executed 3 December 1944 | | | |
| Wilhelm Traub | Born 2 April 1910. Gebietskommissar, "Navahrudak"; SS and Police Leader, "Quarnero". Died in captivity in Yugoslavia on 18 February 1946. | 290239 | | 4355116 |
| Martin Gottfried Weiss | Born 3 June 1905 Weiden in der Oberpfalz. Commandant at Neuengamme concentration camp and in 1945 Dachau concentration camp. Executed 29 May 1946 Landsberg Germany | 31147 | | 43136 |
| Kurt Weisse | Born 11 October 1909 Ehrenfriedersdorf. An SS-Hauptsturmführer in October 1939 while serving in the II./SS-Totenkopf-Infanterie-Regiment. Operations Officer and Deputy Commander of Dirlewanger Brigade. Court martialed on 23 January 1943 for beating a subordinate to death using a rubber trencheon and sent to the SS Danzig-Matzkau Camp. His case drew attention to Oskar Dirlewanger when he visited the camp in May 1943. Dirlewanger recruited him and have his rank to be reinstated to SS-Hauptsturmführer. Joined the SS-Sonderbataillon Dirlewanger on 7 July 1943 as acting company commander charged of commanding the 1st Company 1st Battalion of the SS-Sonderbattalion Dirlewanger (the Dirlewanger Brigade) and adjutant to SS-Obersturmbannführer Oskar Dirlewanger (at that time) and later deputy battalion commander in November. Participated in several anti-partisan operations and later led the SS-Sonderregiment Dirlewanger during the Warsaw Uprising from 5 to 8 August 1944. Awarded Deutsches Kreuz in Gold 17.09.1944. Weisse climb to the rank of SS-Obersturmbannführer in 1945 as the Second World War progressed. On May 1, 1945, Weisse, who was now a division operations officer, along with the remnant of 36th Waffen-Grenadier Division of the SS (the Dirlewanger Brigade) made an attempted to reach the western allied line. Surrender to the Allies on 8 May 1945 and escaped on 6 March 1946 while still in British Custody. Postwar fate unknown | 129,822 | 1932 | 563,159 |
| Eduard Weiter | Born 18 July 1889 in Eschwege near Kassel in Germany. Served in World War I. Commandant of Dachau 1943–1945. Alleged to have been shot by one of his own subordinates April 1945 and died 2 May 1945 | 276877 | October 1936 | 3.958.951 |
| Wolfgang Wetzling | Born 1909. Was also an SS-Oberfeldrichter as well as chief judge of division z.V. Defendant in 1957 trial of March 1945 Amsberger Massacre. In 1958 sentenced to five years in prison for manslaughter in 151 cases. Sentenced to life in prison; was released on 1 March 1974 | | | |
| Max Wielen | Oberregierungs- und Kriminalrat (ORuKR). Reserve captain retd. Position: Chief, Stapoleitstelle Breslau. Involved in killing of POWs from The Great Escape. Sentenced to prison 1947. Released 24 October 1952 | 128841 | | 1759395 |

=== Sturmbannführer (major) ===
| Name | Position | SS number | Joined SS | Party number |
|---|---|---|---|---|
Sturmbannführer (1921–1945)
| Gustav Abb | SS major and head of central administration of libraries in Poland | | July 1940 | 2.579.453 |
| Hans Aumeier | Deputy Commandant KZ Auschwitz | 2.700 | August 1929 | 164.755 |
| Richard Baer | Commander at KZ Auschwitz I | 44225 | 1932 | 454991 |
| Rudolf Batz | Born 10 November 1903. Leader of Einsatzkommando 2; KdS (Kommandeur der Sicherheitspolizei) in Kraków and shortly after that became the head of the Gestapo in Hanover. Committed suicide after 1961 arrest. | 272458 | 10 December 1935 | 2955 |
| Wilhelm Beisner | Born 18 August 1911. In August 1930 joined the SA and in September 1930 the NSDAP. Officer with Einsatzkommando Egypt. Also in 1944 Commander of the Security Police and SD in Trieste. Postwar was an arms dealer and trade agent in Arab countries. Recruited for German Federal Intelligence Service (BND) in October 1957. On 16 October 1960 injured in car explosion in which he lost his leg. Lived in Tunis from 1961 and remained there – at least until the 1980s – as a discussion scout for the BND. Died sometime after 1980. | 65,698 | November 1930 | 374.194 |
| Ernst Biberstein | Commander of SS action command 6/action group C [EK 6/Egr. C]. Tried 1947/1948 and sentenced to death. Sentence commuted to life imprisonment in 1951. After 1958 prison release, reported to have been part of the Gehlen Organization. Died 8 December 1986. | 272962 | 13 September 1936 | 40718 |
| Rudolf Bilfinger | Württemberg Gestapo lawyer, 1937. | | | |
| Friedrich Boßhammer | Born 20 December 1906. Associate of Adolf Eichmann; deported Jews from Italy. Tried for war crimes in 1968. Died in custody 17 December 1972 | 307.435 | 1 October 1937 | 2.326.130 |
| Karl Bömelburg | Gestapo leader in France | 35898 | 1931 | 892239 |
| Wernher von Braun | Born 23 March 1912. Allgemeine-SS battalion officer (also SS Horseriding Club). Involved with slave labor in V-2 Program. Died 16 June 1977 | 185068 | 1940 | 5,738,692 |
| Hermann Otto Bundtke | Born Zduny (Krs. Krotochin/Prov. Posen) 05.09.1897. SS-Sturmbannführer and Major der Schutzpolizei. As Commander of the Third Battalion of the 23rd SS Regiment and the Police (Battalion III/SS-Polizei Regiment 23) participated in executions of Poles and Jews in the Warsaw Ghetto ruins. Was the commander of the Schutzpolizei Bataillon z.b.V. der BdO Rhein-Westmark between XI 1944 and 28 III 1945. Awarded War Cross of Merit I. Class with Swords. Residing in Solingen after the war | 323.311 | 1 May 1939 | 3.471.565 |
| Anton Burger | Commandant of Theresienstadt concentration camp | | | |
| Hans-Georg von Charpentier | Born 16 July 1902. Awarded Knights Cross of the Iron Cross. KIA 9 March 1945 | 258019 | May 1935 | 1375222 |
| Joseph Darnand | Born 19 March 1897. French Waffen-SS Foreign Legion Commander, executed 10 October 1945 | | | |
| Erich Deppner | Born 8 August 1910; Ustuf 9 Nov 38; Hstuf 20 Apr 39. Connected with KZ Westerbork; Amersfoot; Vught. Postwar employed by the Gehlen Organization. 1964 tried for war crimes [acquitted]. Died 13 December 2005 | 177 571 | | 1 254 844 |
| Adolf Diekmann | Born 18 December 1914. Involved in Oradour-sur-Glane massacre. KIA 29 June 1944 | | | |
| Josef Hugo Dischner | Commandant of KZ Westerbork | | | |
| Walter Drexler | Awarded Knight's Cross of the Iron Cross | 239247 | March 1938 | |
| Otto Förschner | KZ Commandant | 191.554 | | 5 274 260 |
| Yuri Igor Frolov | Member of S.S. Sturmbrigade R.O.N.A. | | | |
| Dr. Helmut Hugo Glaser | Born 27 September 1910 in Gmuend, Austria. Joined NSDAP 8 May 1931 | 301760 | 10 OCt 1930 | 444132 |
| Kurt Andreas Graaf | Born 8 January 1909. Member of SD-section III. Died 2 September 1972 | 36.179 | 27 July 1932 | 183.351 |
| Dr. Herbert Grohmann | Born 13 September 1908 in Breslau (Wroclaw). A doctor of Waffen-SS and became a member of NSDAP 1 June 1931 | 51663 | 18 January 1932 | 544053 |
| Adam Grünewald | Commandant of Herzogenbusch concentration camp | | 1934 | |
| Hans Günther | Born 22 August 1910. Adolf Eichmann deputy. Brother of Rolf Günther. Killed 5 May 1945 | 290.129 | 1937 | 119.925 |
| Rolf Günther | Born 8 January 1913. Adolf Eichmann deputy. Brother of Hans Gunther. Died August 1945 | 290.130 | 1937 | 472.421 |
| Bernard Harald Haase | Born 14 October 1910 Altleis. Commandant SD-Außenstelle Groningen. Death sentence 20 March 1950. Commuted 21 January 1950. Released 1 September 1959. Died 9 September 1968 at Bensberg | | | |
| Joachim Hamann | Born 18 May 1913. Served in Einsatzkommando 3 and 4b 22 June 1941 – 2 October 1941. Commanded the Rollkommando Hamann. Worked at Amt IV of RSHA (Gestapo). Aide to Ernst Kaltenbrunner. Died 13 July 1945 | 314267 | 1 July 1938 | 958322 |
| Ernst Hermann Himmler | Born 23 December 1905. Brother of Heinrich Himmler. Killed in Battle of Berlin May 1945 | | 1933 | 676777 |
| Dr. Ernst Holzlöhner | Born 23 February 1899 in Insterburg, Germany. Committed suicide June 1945 | | 1934 | |
| Wilhelm Höttl | Served as political advisor to Edmund Veesenmayer, German plenipotentiary in Hungary during 1944. Höttl testified for the defense at the Nuremberg trials. | 309510 | | 6309616 |
| Hermann Höfle | Deputy head of the Aktion Reinhard programme. Postwar member of Gehlen Organization | 307469 | | 6341873 |
| Axel Holst | Born 11 August 1891 Vallby Sweden. Immigrated to Germany and became member of SS Reiter Troop; attached to SS Oberabschnitt Nord; became a Sturmbannführer on 23 June 1934. Killed in a riding accident 26 January 1935 | 185012 | | |
| Hans Hüttig | Born 5 April 1894. Involved in KZ Buchenwald, KZ Sachsenhausen, KZ Flossenbürg, KZ Natzweiler-Struthof, KZ Herzogenbusch, Grini detention camp. Detained 1945. Sentenced to death 2 July 1954. Released 1956. Died 23 February 1980. | | March 1932 | |
| Professor Herbert Jankuhn | Member of Ahnenerbe | | | |
| Max Joseph Jesuiter | Born 1897. Stabsführer der SSPF Warschau; as Chief of Staff cosigned Stroop Report 19 April 1943 – 9 May 1943. Died 1972 | | | |
| Helmut Kämpfe | SS Officer captured by the French Resistance, which led to Oradour sur Glane massacre | 124.465 | | 2.387.476 |
| Karl-Heinz Keitel | Kavallerie-Regiment Nord; 22nd SS Volunteer Cavalry Division Maria Theresia; 37th SS Volunteer Cavalry Division Lützow | | | |
| Hans Josef Kieffer | Deputy Gestapo leader in France | 280104 | | 2632427 |
| Ludwig Kepplinger | Waffen-SS sergeant | | | |
| Wilhelm Kment | Commander, 1st Company, 2nd SS Panzer Division Das Reich; Decorated personally by Himmler | 167103 | Prior to 1935 | 4262124 |
| Werner Knab | Gestapo chief in Norway; Commander of the Security Police in Lyon, France | 191584 | 1935 | 3269940 |
| Dr. Richard Korherr | Born 30 October 1903. Chief inspector of the statistical bureau of the SS. Author of the Korherr Report. Died 24 November 1989. | | | |
| Horst Kopkow | Born 29 November 1910 Ortelsburg East Prussia. Counterintelligence against spy rings such as Red Orchestra and MI6 and SOE agents-of which he was authorized executions of said agents; postwar employee of MI6. Died 13 October 1996, Glenskirchen, Germany. | 46034 | 1931 | 607161 |
| Hans Kraus | Born 6.01.1904 Riga, Latvia. SS major | 357289 | 1 June 1940 | |
| Bernhard Krüger | Born 26 November 1904. Leader of VI F4A (RSHA) aka Operation Bernhard. Detained by the British after the War and turned over to the French; released; acquitted at denazification hearing. Died 1989. | | | 528729 |
| Dr. Helmut Kunz | Dentist and head of Waffen-SS medical Office | 284787 | 1936 | 5104323 |
| Willi Paul Franz "Willy" Lages | Born 5 October 1901 Braunschweig, Germany. Was head of the Außenstelle (regional office) der Sicherheitspolizei and the Sicherheitsdienst for North Holland and Utrecht. He had an office in Amsterdam. Lages became partly responsible for the deportation of Jews from the Netherlands to concentration and extermination camps in Germany and occupied Poland and was involved in the arrest of the resistance fighter Johannes Post and was present at his execution and that of other resistance fighters, on 16 July 1944. He was also responsible for the Silbertanne murder of the writer A.M. de Jong and for the execution of Hannie Schaft. Tried in 1949 and sentenced to death [sentence commuted]. Released in 1966 for medical treatment in Germany. Because he could not be extradited according to the German constitution, it came down to the fact that, as long as he would refrain from traveling outside Germany, he was a free man. Died Braunlage, Germany 2 April 1971. | 267729 | | 3 552 661 |
| Herbert Lange | Born 29 September 1909. Commander of SS-Sonderkommando Lange; Commandant of Chełmno extermination camp; involved in Aktion T4; died in the Battle of Berlin, 20 April 1945. | 93,501 | 1933 | 1,159,583 |
| Hans Latza | SS and Police Judge in Norway | 129260 | | 2180945 |
| Johann von Leers | SS Officer and Propagandist | | | |
| Ernst Lerch | Chief of Odilo Globočnik's office during Aktion Reinhard, later as Stabsführer then Sturmbannführer | 309,700 | 1 March 1934 | 1,327,396 |
| Walter Maass | Nazi Party Gauleiter in Danzig 1928–1929; member of the SD and RSHA | 46,058 | 15 January 1933 | 21,821 |
| Hans-Georg Mayer | Commandant of Palbianice ghetto in occupied Poland. | 367,767 | 1 August 1940 | 3,069,636 |
| Georg Michalsen | A leading organizer of Aktion Reinhard, involved in liquidation of Polish ghettos; SS and Polizeigebietkommandeur of Trieste | 29337 | 10 January 1932 | 103613 |
| Johann Miesel | Born 1914. Postwar a government official and mayor's representative of Grömitz. Defendant in 1957 trial of March 1945 Amsberger Massacre. In 1958 found guilty only of aiding and abetting manslaughter. Miesel was only slightly involved in the crime and also disapproved of Kammler's order. Since the expected sentence would be less than three years, the court decided to apply paragraph 4 of the Impunity Act 1954. Sentenced to four years in prison on 5 May 1961; sat in Neumünster for six months | | | |
| Georg Konrad Morgen | Born 8 June 1909. SS judge and lawyer. Died 4 February 1982 | | | |
| Alfred Naujocks | Born 20 September 1911. An SD commander, leader of the Gleiwitz incident. Died 4 April 1966 | 624279 | 1930 or 1931 | 26246 |
| Alexander Bernhard Hans Piorkowski | Born 11 October 1904. Commandant of KZ Dachau. Executed 22 October 1948. | 8,737 | 1 June 1933 | 161,437 |
| Dr. Kurt Plötner | Born 19 October 1905. Involved in Human Experiments. Postwar recruited by the CIA. Died 26 February 1984. | | | |
| Paul Otto Radomski | Born 21 September 1902. Commandant of the Syrets concentration camp and Haidari concentration camp. Relieved of command in 1944. Reported died 14 March 1945 | 2.235 | | 96.942 |
| Karl Rahm | Commandant of the Theresienstadt concentration camp | | | |
| Walter Reder | Born 4 Feb 1915 Czechoslovakia. May have been involved in suppression of Warsaw Ghetto Uprising in 1943 and was definitely involved in Marzabotto massacre of 1944. Sentenced to life in prison in 1951 and released in 1985. Died 26 April 1991 | | | |
| Ludwig Ruckdeschel | Born 15 March 1907. Gauleiter of Bayreuth. Arrested 1947-sentenced to 8 years; 1949 sentence changed to 13 years. Released 1952. Died 8 November 1986 | 234.190 | 20 Oct 1934 | 29308 |
| von Salish | Member of SD; aka Captain von Seidlitz involved in Venlo incident | | | |
| August Schiffer | Tried and executed 26 July 1946 in killing U.S. Soldier Roderick Stephen Hall and murders of six other Allied soldiers | | | |
| Johannes Claus Schmidt | Born 11 March 1908. Member of SD-section OST and SD-section III. Involved in killing of Kurt von Schleicher 30 June 1934. Died 23 December 1976 | | 30 June 1933 | |
| Philipp Johann Adolf Schmitt | Born 10 November 1902. Commandant of the concentration camp Fort Breendonk and the SS-Sammellager Mecheln. Tried and executed 9 August 1950 | 44291 | March 1932 | 19192 |
| Joseph Tobias Schreieder | Born 15 August 1904. With German Intelligence Officer Hermann Giskes he ran the Englandspiel operation in which over 50 Dutch Agents were captured due to SOE refusal to follow its own security checks. Postwar worked for the Ghelen Org. | | 15 August 1934 | |
| Dr. Horst Schumann | Born 1 May 1906. Physician involved in human experiments. Tried 1970–1971; released from prison 1972. Died 5 May 1983 | | | 190.002 |
| Christian Shnug | Born 28 January 1891. Member of Lebensborn e.V. Commander of I. Sturmbann of SS-Standarte 27 (as per SS-DAL of 1 July 1935 and of 1 Dec. 1936); attached to the staff of Abschnitt XII (as per SS-DAL of 1 Dec. 38); Commander of II. Sturmbann of 118th SS-Standarte (as per SS-DAL of 1 Oct. 42); Commander of II. Sturmbann of 116th SS-Standarte (as per SS-DAL of 1 Oct. 43 and of 1 Oct. 44). Living 1972 reported, died several years later | 25738 | | 765 687 |
| Otto Skorzeny | Waffen-SS/RSHA commando leader | 295979 | | 1083671 |
| Karl Julian Sommer | Born 25 March 1915. At Pohl Trial-sentenced to hang; commuted to lifetime imprisonment in 1949; commuted to 20 years in 1951. Released 11 December 1953 | | | |
| Adolf Feitel | Einsatzkommando 10b (January–May 1945) | | | |
| Walter Hugo Stamm | Born 1904. Connected with the SD and Section IV (Gestapo) Warsaw. Died 1970 | 291041 | | 3472486 |
| Karl Streibel | Specialist Officer attached to Staff Oberabschnitt Ost as referent zbz in Arbeitsstab der Allgemeine SS Lublin; duty as Leiter der Ausbildungslager Trawinki in stab SSPF Lublin | 60152 | | 554023 |
| Eduard Ritter von Schleich | Born 9 August 1888. From 1 October 1931 to 15 April 1934 he led the SS-Fliegerstaffel, a paramilitary flying organization. Died 15 November 1947 | | 1 April 1931 | |
| Karl Freiherr Michel von Tüßling | Born 27. July 1907 in Tüßling, Bavaria. In 1935 summoned to Berlin; from 1936, personal adjutant of Reichsleiter Philipp Bouhler, who was in charge of Hitler's Chancellery (Kanzlei des Führers) and head of the euthanasia programme Aktion T4 SS-Sturmbannführer: 30.01.1941 Provided affidavit in 1947 to exonerate war criminal Viktor Brack at the Nuremberg trials. | 56074 | April 1933 | 1726624 |
| Dr. Carl Værnet | SS major; physician involved in human experiments | | | |
| Dr. Albert Widmann | Born 8 June 1912. Chemist involved in Action T4 killings and human experiments. Arrested 1959-served 6 years 6 months. Died 24 December 1986 | 351098 | December 1939 | 5454700 |
| Christian Wirth | Commandant of Bełżec extermination camp | 345.464 | April 1939 | 420.383 |
| Dr. Eduard Wirths | Chief SS doctor (SS-Standortarzt) at the KZ Auschwitz | 311.594 | 1934 | 3139549 |
| Herbert Klaus Wölk | Born 21 June 1905. Kriminalrat der Polizei. Served in the staff of the Befehlshaber der Sicherheitspolizei und des SD (BdS) in the Netherlands; head of a Sipo-Sonderkommando; chief Außenstelle der Sipo and SD in Rotterdam. Sentenced to 20 years imprisonment 24.07.1949 in Den Haag; released 02.08.1957 | 15.429 | | 278.643 |
| Carltheo Zeitschel | Born 13 March 1893. Was the desk officer for Jewish affair (Judenreferent) at the German embassy in Paris, France. Alleged to have been killed 21 April 1945; in 1954 sentenced in absentia for his crimes to lifelong forced labor. | | 20 April 1939 | |
| Egon Zill | Born 28 March 1906 Plauen. Kommandant of Natzweiler-Struthof and Flossenbürg concentration camps. In 1955 sentenced to life imprisonment, later reduced to 15 years. Died 23 October 1974 Dachau, Germany | 535 | 1 August 1926 | 20.063 |

=== Hauptsturmführer (captain) ===
| Name | Position | SS number | Joined SS | Party number |
|---|---|---|---|---|
Hauptsturmführer (1928–1945)
| Franz Abromeit | Born 08.08.1907, RSHA. Died 30.06.1964. | 272353 | | 329305 |
| Walter Albers | Born 06.08.1905. Sipo Amsterdam, sentenced to 12 years imprisonment 08.11.1949 in Amsterdam, released 22.12.1952 | | | |
| Siegfried Assmuss | Born 20.8.1912. SS-Hstuf.20.4.1939; SD-Hauptamt; SD in Lutsk. Killed 22.7.1944; Leader of the Ukrainian Self-Defense Legion. In retaliation for his death, 44 villagers of Chłaniów and Władysławin Poland were killed by the Ukrainian Self-Defense Legion. | 49 786 | | 721 802 |
| Karl Babor | | | | |
| Georg Bachmayer | | | | |
| Klaus Barbie | Born 25 October 1913. Head of the Gestapo in Lyon, France. Died in prison 25 September 1991 | 272 284 | 26 September 1935 | 4.583.085. |
| Dr. Bruno Beger | Racial anthropologist who worked for the Ahnenerbe. | | | |
| Peter Bell | Reported to have been killed in Holland on orders of superior Karl Eberhard Schongarth | | | |
| Wolfgang Birkner | Born 27 October 1913. KdS Warschau (Komandeur der Sicherheitspolizei); Kommando SS Bialystok. Killed 24 March 1945 | 265.793 | | 3,601,309 |
| Hans Carl Christian Blumenthal | Born 1909 in Bremen. Sipo Amsterdam (III). Sentenced to 7 years imprisonment 25.11.1949 in Amsterdam, released 16.02.1951. Died 1987 | | | |
| Otto Albrecht Alfred von Bolschwing | Born 15 October 1909, Schoenbruch. Promoted Hstuf: 30.01.1941, (SD). SS captain and adjutant to Adolf Eichmann. After the war worked for the CIA; lost US citizenship 1981. Died 7 March 1982 in San Francisco, California | 353.603 | 1933 | 984.212 |
| Joachim Boosfeld | SS Obersturmführer | 362.256 | 1939 | |
| Alois Brunner | Born 08.04.1912, Rohrbrunn, Austria. Commandant of Drancy internment camp. Adolf Eichmann's assistant. Postwar alias Dr. Georg Fischer-resident in Syria. Alleged to have been member of West German BND. In 1989 the Syrian Government declined to extradite him to Germany after the fall of the Berlin Wall. Alleged to have been alive as of 2001. Unknown if still alive. | 342767 | 10 August 1939 | 510 064 |
| Kurt Brunow | Member of the SD | | | |
| Karl Chmielewski | The "Devil of Gusen", Schutzhaftlagerführer at Gusen concentration camp, Commandant of Herzogenbusch concentration camp, tried and convicted in 1961 of war crimes and crimes against humanity and sentenced to life imprisonment | 63935 | 1932 | 1508254 |
| Christian | Member of SD; aka Lieutenant Grosch involved in Venlo incident | | | |
| Douglas Berneville-Claye | British impostor/forger; member of staff of III (Germanic) SS Panzer Corps | | | |
| Johannes Max Clemens | Born 9 Feb 1902. Member of SD and postwar a KGB spy in Gehlen Organization. Tried 1963 in Hans Felfe Trial and sentenced to 10 years. Died 1976. | | | |
| Theodor Dannecker | Born 27.03.1913 in Tübingen. SD Belgium, Sonderkommando Eichmann in Sofia and Hungary. Also worked in Department of Jewish affairs as a "jewish specialist" with Adolf Eichmann. Suicide 10.12.1945 in Bad Tölz | | | |
| Heinz Drescher | Kriminalrat der Polizei, Head of Central fingerprint collection with RKPA within RSHA | 290306 | 9.11.1938 | |
| Dr. Hans Kurt Eisle | Born 13 March 1913. Assigned to KZ Mauthausen, Buchenwald, Natzweiler-Struthof, Dachau. Arrested April 1945. Tried 13 December 1945. Condemned to death-sentence commuted to life in prison. Released 26 February 1952. Died 3 May 1967 Cairo, Egypt | 237,421 | 1933 | 3,125,695 |
| Rolf Engel | Born 10 August 1912. As a member of the SD, he was stationed in Strasbourg, Member of Peenemünde Army Experimental Institute. Engel headed the SS DTS Research Center for Jet Drive in Großendorf near Gdansk. He was a member of the Imperial Research Council. In 1945, he was hired from a prisoner of war camp by the French occupying authority for the Laboratoire de recherches balistiques et aéro-dynamiques, a ballistic missile development center near Paris, where, according to Gerhard Bauch (1962) Cairo) was involved in the development of the Gabriel missile. He was recruited to lead an Egyptian missile program in the 1950s, which failed due to missing components. Died 23 November 1993 | | 1933 | |
| Siegfried Wolfgang Fehmer | SD/Gestapo/Kriminalrat, a police investigator, and headed the infamous Abteilung IV headquartered in Victoria Terrasse, Norway | 290166 | | 181345 |
| Henk Feldmeijer | Born Johannes Hendrik Feldmeijer (Assen, 30 November 1910). Member of the National Socialist Movement in the Netherlands # 479. Commander of the Nederlandsche SS. Served in Waffen-SS. Member of the Sonderkommando-Feldmeijer and the killing of Dutch Resistance members in Operation Silbertanne. {Members of Sonderkommando-Feldmeijer included Heinrich Boere and Klaas Carel Faber}. Killed 22 February 1945 | | | |
| Henri Joseph Fenet | Born 11 July 1919. A French collaborator during World War II who was awarded both the Croix de Guerre by France, and the Knight's Cross of the Iron Cross by Nazi Germany. Battle of Berlin, 28 April, one-hundred eight Soviet tanks had been destroyed in the southeast of Berlin within the S-Bahn. The French squads under the command of Fenet accounted for "about half" of the tanks.^{[5]} For the success of the battalion during the Battle of Berlin Fenet was awarded the Knight's Cross of the Iron Cross on 29 April 1945 by Wilhelm Mohnke. Died 14 September 2002 | | | |
| Kinrad Fiebig | Born 22 September 1909 | | | |
| Dr. Horst Fischer | Born 31 December 1912. Doctor at KZ Auschwitz. Executed in East Germany 8 July 1966 | 293.397 | 1 November 1933 | 5.370.071 |
| Hermann Florstedt | Born 18 February 1895; World War I veteran. Served at KZ Sachsenhausen concentration camp and was Commandant of Majdanek. Charged with embezzlement and killing prisoner witness. Shot by SS 15 April 1945 | 8.660 | May 1931 | 488.573 |
| Friedrich Franz, Hereditary Grand Duke of Mecklenburg-Schwerin | Born 22 April 1910. Aide to Werner Best. Also served in SS Panzer Corps. Died 31 July 2001 | | May 1931 | |
| Günther Franz | German historian and Nazi ideologue | | | |
| Karl Fritzsch | Born 10 July 1903. Member of staffs of KZ Dachau, KZ Auschwitz, and KZ Flossenbürg. Introduced Zyklon B gas into Auschwitz. Involved in death of Saint Maximilian Kolbe. Reported missing 2 May 1945 – unknown if he was killed or survived the war | 7287 | 1930 | 261135 |
| Paul Fuchs | Chief of departments IV A and IV N of Kommandeur der Sicherheitspolizei und des SD (KdS) in Radom. Liaison officer at Polish NSZ staff. After war Fuchs operated with Hubert Jura for the US intelligence network created to work in the newly established countries controlled by the Soviet Union | | | |
| Hans Gaier | Born 19 February 1902 Mannheim, Germany. SA-Obersturmbannführer; was also Police Hauptmann (Polizeidirektor) der Schutzpolizei Kielce Poland. Declared legally dead in May 1954; ironically according to German Wikipedia while hiding under a false name in Graz, Austria Gaier was executed May/June 1945. | | | 662.558 |
| Wilhelm Gerstenmeier | Born 1908. Involved in Harvest Festival massacre of Jews. Executed 3 December 1944 for war crimes. | 13300 | | |
| Franz Goering | Served as assistant to Walter Schellenberg from 1944. | | | |
| Amon Göth | Commander of the Plaszow concentration camp | 43673 | 1930 | 510764 |
| Viktor Eberhard Gräbner | 9th SS Panzer Division Hohenstaufen. Awarded the Knight's Cross. KIA during Operation Market Garden, 1944 | 247812 | | |
| Heinrich Hamann | Born 1 September 1908 in Bordesholm. Untersturmführer: 30 January 1937. Ostuf: 12 March 1938. Chief of Grenzpolizeikommisariat Neu Sandez: December 1939 – 12 August 1943. Promoted to Kriminalkommissar in January 1940. Chief of GPK in Jaslo: 12 August 1943 – 1 November 1943. Chief of department IV A of KdS Krakau – 11.1943–01.1945. [Promoted SS-Hstuf:20.04.1944] Sentenced by court in Bochum in 1966 to life imprisonment. Died 16.04.1993 | 33 531 | 1931 | |
| Oscar Hans | Employee of SD-Hauptamt since 1934. Sent to Norway – Befehlshaber der Sicherheitspolizei und des SD (BdS) Oslo / Leiter I – on 25 April 1940, where he served until May 1945. Arrested 25 May 1945 Kristiansand. Stood trial but was released by the Supreme Court of Norway in August 1947. Tried July–August 1948 by British Military Court in Hamburg ("Trandum Case No. 2"). Sentenced to 15 years for killing of six British citizens. | 101662 | 1933 | |
| Karl Hass | SD member. Participant in the Ardeatine Caves massacre | | 1934 | |
| Walter Hauck | Born 4 June 1918. Served in German Police. Also served in the 12th SS Panzer Division Hitlerjugend. Involved in the Ascq massacre on 1 April 1944 and a massacre at Leskovice in May 1945. Judged 1949 and sentenced to death; after requests by some widows of the Ascq massacre, his sentence was converted to life imprisonment. Released in July 1957. In 1969 and 1977, Czechoslovakia asked Germany to extradite him for punishment for the second massacre, but these requests were rejected by a Stuttgart court. In 2005, the Czech Republic again asked for his extradition. Died 6 November 2006 in Germany. | 382.376 | | |
| Gottlieb Hering | In Action T4 and later served as the second and last Commandant of Bełżec extermination camp during Operation Reinhard | | | |
| Dr. Kurt Heissmeyer | Doctor involved in "experiments" on Jewish children at Bullenhuser Damm | | | |
| Dr. August Hirt | Had Jews gassed for their skeletons | 100.414 | 1 April 1933 | |
| Franz Hoessler | KZ Auschwitz; KZ Bergen Belsen | 41.940 | 1931 | 1.374.713 |
| Wilhelm Gottlieb Hohmann | Born 07 I 1907 Remscheid. SS-Hauptsturmführer and Kriminalrat; was replaced as head Referat IV 1 (former IV A) KdS Warschau in May 1944 by SS-Hauptsturmführer and Kriminalrat Harald Wiesman; Hohmann died in 1961 of suicide. | | | |
| Dr. Waldemar Hoven | KZ Buchenwald physician | 244.594 | 1934 | |
| Heinz Kessler | SS officer | 193182 | | |
| Karl Kloskowski | Served in 2nd SS Panzer Division Das Reich and SS Brigade Westfalen | | 1936 | |
| Franz Konrad | Acquisitions officer Warsaw Ghetto | 46204 | January 1933 | 1085499 |
| Max Hermann Richard Krahner | 1968 sentenced to life in prison for being a German Overseer of Jewish Sonderkommando 1005 | | | |
| Waldemar Kraft | Held honorary rank in the SS | | | |
| Josef Kramer | Commandant of Bergen-Belsen concentration camp; involved with Dr. August Hirt in killing of Jews in 1943 | 32.217 | 20 June 1932 | 753.597 |
| Karl Wilhelm Krause | Born 05/03/1911 Michelau, Prussia. Reichsmarine 1931–34; Hitler's Valet/Orderly 1934–to mid-September 1939; LSSAH 1934-to mid-September 1939; Kriegsmarine in late 1939–1943 and Flak-Zug, II./Pz.Rgt. 12 from Dec. 1943 to 1945. Interred until June 1946; fined and released. Died 6 May 2001 | 236 858 | | |
| Hans Kruger | Born 1909. Arrested 1959 war crimes; tried 1965–1967; sentenced 1968 to life in prison. Released 1986; died 1988. | | | |
| Henri Lafont | Head of the French Gestapo | | | |
| Ewald Lindloff | Born 2 September 1908. Served in 1st SS Division LSSAH. Placed in charge of disposing of Hitler's remains on 30 April 1945 by Otto Günsche. KIA 2 May 1945 | | 1 May 1932 | |
| Maximilian List | Commandant of Lager Sylt and Lager Norderney labour camps on Alderney | | | |
| Rudolf Ludwig | Born 27 January 1921. Died 24 August 1944. Buried in Narva, Estonia. | | | |
| Heinz Macher | Leader of the SS group ordered to blow up the castle Wewelsburg | | | |
| Dr. Josef Mengele | Born 16 March 1911. Medical officer at Auschwitz-Birkenau. Involved with human experiments. Died 7 February 1979 | 317885 | May 1938 | 5574974 |
| Helmut Merz | Born 1911. A Higher Regional Court Councillor from Neustadt an der Weinstraße. In 1957 during the trial of March 1945 Arnsberg Massacre, he denied his own complicity and testified as a witness for the prosecution. | | | |
| Georg Simon Michaelson | Born 13.9.1906. Promoted 30 January 1942. Involved in suppression of the Warsaw Ghetto Uprising April–May 1943; sentenced to 12 years in prison Hamburg, Germany 25 July 1974; reported to have died early 1990s. | 29337 | | 103613 |
| Erich Priebke | SD and Sicherheitspolizei commander in Rome, Italy | | | |
| Eugen Graf von Quadt zu Wykradt und Isny | Allgemeine SS; Reichstag deputy | 274757 | 12 October 1935 | 5354017 |
| Sigmund Rascher | German SS doctor, who carried out deadly experiments on humans in the Nazi concentration camp of Dachau | | 1939 | |
| Franz Karl Reichleitner | Second and last Commandant of Sobibor extermination camp | 357065 | | 6369213 |
| Rudolf Reinecke | SS Totenkopf and SS Frunsberg Divisions Died 1995 | | | |
| Rudolf von Ribbentrop | Waffen-SS Officer (branch: Panzertruppe) | | | |
| Fritz Ritterbusch | Born 11 January 1894. Served in World War I. Since the spring of 1940 to 30 January 1941 he held an unspecified role in the Division IV camp Flossenbürg KL, where then was transferred to the post of commander of one of the camp guard companies. The camp moved to the headquarters staff of KZ Hinzert, where he was adjutant to the commandant of the camp, Paul Sporrenberg. On 18 June 1943 he moved to KZ Lublin. In the spring of 1944 he was moved to KZ Gross-Rosen where since May 1944 to 13 February 1945 he was commander of SS-Kommando Trautenau and the head of subcamp Parschnitz in Poříčí and AL Trautenau in Trutnov in the Czech Republic. He was arrested by Soviet forces on 1 January 1946. On 25 March 1946 he was sentenced to death by a Soviet Military Tribunal, a special form of a court-martial. On 14 May 1946 Ritterbusch was executed at an unknown place. | 9.107 | 1931 | 6.317 |
| Eduard Roschmann | Born 25 November 1908. Commandant of the Riga Ghetto; Kommandeur der Sicherheitspolizei und SD IV = Department 4 (Gestapo). Lived in Argentina; died 8 August 1977 Paraguay | 152681 | 1938 | |
| Bernd Rosemeyer | Born 14 October 1909. Stab des SS-Hauptamt; professional race-car driver, killed in car accident 1 January 1938 | 214952 | November 1933 | |
| Hermann Schaper | Born 12 August 1911. Kommando SS Zichenau-Schröttersburg. Died after April 2002 | 3484 | 1937 | 105606 |
| Dr. Heinrich Schmidt | Born 27 March 1912. SS Physician involved with six KZ Camps. Twice tried for war crimes-and acquitted. Died 28 November 2000 | 23069 | 1937 | 555,294 |
| Lothar Schmidt | Head of the personnel division of the Ministry of Economics and Labor in the Protectorate of Bohemia and Moravia. Briefly worked as an interpreter for the U.S. army in Bavaria before being arrested in Altötting in August 1945. Not to be confused with SS-Obersturmführer Lothar Henry Schmidt (1912–1996). | | | |
| Wilhelm Schröder | NSDAP official, first lieutenant of Waffen-SS and a member of Sturmabteilung | 177382 | | |
| Günther Schwägermann | Adjutant to Dr. Joseph Goebbels. | 312.231 | | |
| Heinrich Schwarz | Administrative aide to Rudolf Höss. Commandant of Auschwitz III-Monowitz 1943–1945. Commandant of Natzweiler-Struthof 1945 | | | |
| Siegfried Seidl | Born 24 August 1911. Commandant of Theresienstadt concentration camp. Executed 4 February 1947 | 46.106 | 1932 | 300.378 |
| Alfred Spilker | Originally came to the new Stapoleitstelle Wien in 1938; Sipo-Einsatz in Poland from 1939 to 1944, then returned to Wien. He was last reported at Lilienfeld, April 1945. | | | |
| Franz Stangl | Born 26 March 1908. Commandant of the Sobibor and Treblinka extermination camps; died in prison 28 June 1971 | 296,569 | March 1938 | 6,370,447 |
| Erich Steidtmann | Born 15 November 1914. Commander of 3rd Battalion/Police Regiment 22 during Warsaw Ghetto Uprising; member of German Police Battalion 101 during Aktion Erntefest (harvest festival massacre). Died 25 July 2010 | 160 812 | | |
| Karl Streibel | Born 11 October 1903 Bavaria. Commander of Trawniki concentration camp. Reportedly died 1986. | | 1933 | |
| Max Teichmann | SS officer | 177718 | | 1977669 |
| Richard Thomalla | SS commander; head of SS central building administration; lead architect of Operation Reinhard camps | 41.206 | 1932 | 1.238.872 |
| Eduard Paul Tratz | Zoologist and officer in the Ahnenerbe | | | |
| Leo Klaus Volk | Born 2 May 1909. Adjutant for Oswald Pohl. Died 1973 | 219.415 | November 1933 | 2.639.413 |
| Walter Oscar Wache | Born 17.01.1908. He attended the Humanistisches Gymnasium where he studied German and History. In 1928 he was a member of the Freikorps. In 1929 he became leader of the Deutscher Mittelschülerbund Österreichs which later became known as NS-Schülerbund. In 1932 he joined the NSDAP and the SS. In 1933 he became a teacher. In Austria at that time he was given a criminal record for his political activities and therefore was unable to take a job with the state as a librarian. In 1934 he obtained a scholarship in Prague to study German Human Sciences, but was arrested for spying and deported to Germany. Granted German citizenship and worked in the RuSHA as a historical researcher. In October 1936 he became an assistant at the University of Köln where he became a lecturer and professor in Middle and Modern History. He worked in a political capacity for the SS. He created film for the university promoting the National Socialist doctrine writing articles in "SS-Leithefte" at the same time wrote the book/pamphlet "Judenfibel" as a reference to the Jews. Became an SS Untersturmführer 24.04.1937. In 1938 his work extended with the 'Ahnenerbe'. He was awarded the Iron Cross in 1941. In 1944, served in the SS Division Das Reich. Postwar reported to have settled in Republic of South Africa | 80401 | 1932 | 1300059 |
| Bernhard Wehner | Born 15 December 1909. Led sub-department BI a2 Department V aka Reichskriminalpolizeiamt (Reich Criminal Police Department) of the RSHA under Arthur Nebe. Postwar journalist for Der Spiegel; 1954 head of Düsseldorf Criminal Police Department. Died 31 December 1995 | 414.073 | 1942 | 518.544 |
| Hermann Weiser | Waffen-SS captain and recipient of Knight's Cross of the Iron Cross | 351242 | | |
| Paul Werner | Born 05 IX 1890 Dragass/Dragacz. SS-Hauptsturmführer and Kriminalrat; headed briefly the Referat IV B in 1942. Participated in executions of Poles and Jews in the Warsaw Ghetto ruins. | | | |
| Harald Franz Wiesmann | Born 22 IV 1909 Krefeld. SS-Hauptsturmführer and Kriminalrat. Became head Referat IV 1 (former IV A) KdS Warschau in May 1944, seriously wounded on 20 VII 1944 during a riot in the prison of the SIPO and the SD "Pawiak"; died 24 IV 1947 Praha | | | |
| Oskar Winkler | Born December 17, 1910, in Jscherei, District of Lüben, Silesia. Joined the SS in 1933, the SD in 1936 and the NSDAP in 1937. Promoted to SS-Untersturmführer on April 20, 1939 (Hitler's birthday). Served as SS-Obersturmführer (promoted September, 9th, 1940) in Einsatzgruppe B, EK 8 under the command of Dr. Otto Bradfisch from June to October 1941 in Belarus. He also led a small squad of SS-men of EK 8 for separate executions. He participated in mass executions in Białystok, Novogrodek, Baranovičy, Minsk ("Prototype-Shootings" for Heinrich Himmler), Mogilev, and Gomel, as confirmed by witnesses during his trial and his own confession. Promoted to Hauptsturmführer on April 20, 1942 (Hitler's birthday) to serve as Commander of the SiPo (Sicherheitspolizei) and head of division III of the SD (Sicherheitsdienst), as Second in Command of the RSHA (Reich Security Main Office) office in Bergen, Norway until the end of the war. Indicted in the Munich Einsatzgruppen-Trial together with Dr. Otto Bradfisch, Wilhelm Schulz, Carl Ruhrberg and Günther Ströh, as part of the NSG Trials (Nationalsozialistische Gewaltverbrechen - national socialist violent felonies) and sentenced to 3 1/2 years of imprisonment on July 21, 1961, for the collaborated murder of 650 victims. Died in Georgsmarienhütte, district of Osnabrück, Lower-Saxony, on September 9, 1980. | 196489 | 1933 | 4863426 |
| Michael Wittmann | Born 22 April 1914. Waffen-SS Panzer ace with the LSSAH (branch: Panzertruppe) KIA 8 August 1944 | 311623 | October 1936 | 5508244 |
| Hans Woellke | Commander of Schutzmannschaft Battalion 118. Killed in combat on 22 March 1943 | | | |

=== Obersturmführer (first lieutenant) ===
| Name | Position | SS number | Joined SS | Party number |
|---|---|---|---|---|
Obersturmführer (1932–1945)
| Johann Altfuldisch | Born November 11, 1911, Brückenau, Germany. On January 1, 1930, he joined the Hitler Youth and on February 1, 1931, the Nazi Party. On September 24, 1933, he began his service with the guard unit at Dachau concentration camp, where he was transferred to the commandant's staff on May 2, 1936. In 1936, he apparently served briefly at Columbia concentration camp. After its closure in early November 1936, Altfuldisch was transferred to Sachsenhausen concentration camp and served on the commandant's staff from 1937. In July 1937, he was transferred back to Dachau, where he also worked on the Dachau commandant's staff. In August 1938, he was transferred to Mauthausen concentration camp. Initially, he was a block and report leader and in 1941 took over the management of the postal censorship office. In 1938 he joined the Waffen-SS. In early March 1944, he became camp commander of the Leibnitz subcamp. After being replaced in this position shortly afterwards by Franz Miroff, he was entrusted with the command of the Großraming subcamp. In autumn of 1944 he became the second protective custody camp commander in the Mauthausen main camp, where he ordered and personally participated in many executions. He turned himself in on November 3, 1945, at the Hammelburg prisoner-of-war camp, where he was arrested the same day by OSS agents and taken to the Salzburg police prison, and then transferred to Dachau. On May 13, 1946, he was found guilty of committing the above-mentioned crimes. He was hanged May 28, 1947, Landsberg am Lech, Bavaria, Germany | 14,958 | 1 september 1931 | 397,051 |
| Kurt Asche | Born 11 October 1909 in Hamburg. From April 1935, he was employed by the party's Security Service (SD), initially as a guard and later as a clerk. After the outbreak of war, from 1939 to 1940, he was a member of the SD office in occupied Lublin, where he worked in the Jewish Affairs Department. In November 1941, he was introduced to Brussels by his colleague Theodor Dannecker, who had since become the Jewish Affairs Officer in Paris. Under the local BdS (Commander of Security), he was initially placed under the authority of Humpert, the Jewish Affairs Officer. A few months later, Kurt Asche himself took over the management of the "Jewish Affairs Department" in occupied Belgium; he was involved in the Holocaust and, from 1942 to 1944, was responsible for the deportation of 26,000 Jews and Gypsies to Auschwitz. In May 1944, an SS police court sentenced him one year and four months in prison for enriching himself from the assets of Belgian Jews. In January 1945, he was released from prison and transferred to an SS combat unit. Asche was eventually brought to trial in Kiel for his part in the 26,000 deaths. After a mammoth trial that lasted eighteen years Asche was eventually sentenced to seven years imprisonment in 1981. Asche began serving his sentence in 1983. He was released from prison in 1987. Died 16 April 1997 in Hamburg | 267,365 | April 1935 | 857,136 |
| Heinz Barth | Born 15 October 1920. Involved in Oradour-sur-Glane massacre of 1944. Arrested 1981; tried 1983 sentenced to life; released 1997. Died 14 August 2007 | 458037 | 10 February 1943 | 7844901 |
| August Blei | Born 26 August 1893. KZ Mauthausen. Tried Dachau Trials. Executed 28 May 1947 | 454747 | | |
| Johannes Alfred Böhm | Born 17 II 1912. Chief of Referat IV B (Kirchen, Konfessionen und Sekten) KdS Warschau was SS-Obersturmführer and Kriminalkommissar. Died Dresden 1999 | | | |
| Arnold Büscher | Born 16 December 1899. The second and last commandant of the Kraków-Płaszów concentration camp, succeeding Amon Göth, from September 1944 until about January 1945. Executed 2 August 1949 | 11382 | 1931 | 556.757 |
| Rolf Czurda | SD officer in Poland; portrayed in the film Schindler's List | 359504 | 1940(?) | |
| Carl Denhard | On 2 July 1934 killed SS-Oberabschnittsreiterführer Anton von Hohberg and Buchwald | | | |
| Heinrich "Heinz" Georg Alfred Detmers | Born 10 April 1919. Adjutant of KZ Dachau. Died 8 June 1999 | 309.930 | | 5.545.920 |
| Julius Dettmann | Born 23 January 1894 SD Officer and member of Section IV B4 of the Gestapo in Amsterdam, Netherlands. Captured. Suicide 25 July 1945 | 414,783 | | 722,240 |
| Alfred Driemel | Born 24.08.1907 in Küstrin. Officer at KZ Dachau, KZ Salza, KZ Buchenwald, KZ Sachsenhausen. Executed 19.12.1946 Berlin, Germany | | | |
| Dr. Irmfried Eberl | Born 8 September 1910. Involved in T-4 Euthanasia Program and K-Z Treblinka. Suicide 16 February 1948 | | | 687095 |
| Paul Egger | Luftwaffe pilot and 102nd SS Heavy Panzer Battalion | | | |
| Friedrich August Enkelstroth | Born 18.11.1906 in Twistringen. Sipo Arnhem, SS-Obersturmführer. Sentenced to 12 years imprisonment 12.04.1949 in 's-Hertogenbosch, released 28.08.1951. Died 27.10.1955 in Hamburg | | | |
| Willy Lucas Falkenberg | Member of SD-section III | | | |
| Heinz Felfe | Born 18.03.1918. SD Switzerland and Netherlands; postwar KGB spy in British Intelligence and the CIA-sponsored Gehlen Organization. Exposed 06.11.1961 and tried 1963; sentenced to 14 years but exchanged in 1969 for 3 German Students. Died 08.05.2008 | 286288 | 1936 | 3710348 |
| Hans Fleischhacker | Born 10.03.1912 Töttleben, Erfurt. Involved with SS-Rasse- und Siedlungshauptamt. In 1948 designated a Mitläufer. Case brought against him for involvement in KZ Auschwitz in 1970-but dismissed in 1971 on grounds of "insufficient evidence". Died 30 January 1992 | | 1937 | |
| Albert Konrad Gemmeker | Born 27 September 1907. Commandant of KZ Westerbork. Postwar sentenced to 10 years in prison; released 1951. Died 1982 | | 1 November 1940 | |
| Kurt Gerstein | Born 11.08.1905. Munster, Westphalia, Germany. Member of the Institute for Hygiene of the Waffen-SS and author of the Gerstein Report. Died 25.07.1945 while a POW | 417.460 | 10 March 1941 | 2.136.174 |
| Robert Griesinger | Lawyer in the Württemberg Gestapo, 1933–1935. Senior civil servant in the Protectorate of Bohemia and Moravia, Ministry of Economics and Labor, March 1943 - May 1945. Administered forced Jewish labor in Czechoslovakia and in the Theresienstadt Ghetto. | 161,860 | 11 September 1933 | |
| Werner Theodor Göttsch | Born 23 October 1912. Member of SD-section OST and SD-section III. Died 2 May 1983. | 10.238 | 15 March 1931 | 459.389 |
| Georg Güßregen | Born 1890. Gross-Rosen 1941, Auschwitz 1942 and Flossenburg 1943 | 222498 | 10 September 1939 | 3988326 |
| Willy Hack | Born 26 March 1912. SS-Oberscharführer in SS-Panzer-Pionier-Battalion 3: Feb. 1942; SS-Obersturmführer in SS-Wirtschafts-Verwaltungshauptamt: Jan. 1945; in charge of construction site Schwalde V. (Jewish-American POWS were held here). Hanged 26 July 1952, Dresden. | 70329 | | |
| Walter Heinrich | Born 1910. Lagerführer KZ Amersfoort. Disappeared February 1945-fate unknown. | | | |
| Karl-Friedrich Höcker | Born 11 December 1911. Adjutant at KZ Auschwitz. From 1965 to 1970 in prison; 1989 sentenced to four years. Died 30 January 2000 | 182.961 | October 1933 | 4.444.757 |
| Anton von Hohberg und Buchwald | Former SS-Oberabschnittsreiterführer (regional SS Cavalry leader); reported killed by SS General Erich von dem Bach-Zelewski during Night of the Long Knives in 1934 | | | |
| Arno Bernhard Huhn | Born 28.08.1911 in Potsdam. Sipo Arnhem, SS-Obersturmführer. Sentenced to 17 years imprisonment 20.10.1948 in Arnhem, released 10.05.1954 | | | |
| Erhard Jung | Geology professor at University of Hohenheim. | | 1933 | 1.196.995 |
| Hans Hermann Junge | Born 11 February 1944. Member of SS Division Leibstandarte; Führerbegleitkommando; SS Division Hitlerjugend. Killed in Normandy, France 13 August 1944 | | 1933 | |
| Herbert Junk | SS airfield security guard in France | | | |
| Johann Kantschuster | Born 20 May 1897. KZ Dachau; KZ Ravensbruck; Fort Breendonk (Belgium). Missing 1945, fate unknown | 58541 | 1931 | 76941 |
| Michael Karkoc | Born 6 March 1919. A Lt of the Ukrainian Legion and later the Waffen-SS. Died 14 December 2019 | | | |
| Dr. Johann Paul Kremer | Born 26 December 1883. SS doctor at Auschwitz; involved in human experiments; tried 1947 Auschwitz trial death sentence cummuted to life in prison; released 1958; died 1965 | 262703 | 1934 | 1265405 |
| Aleksander Laak | Born 1907. Lt in the Estonian Security Police and the SD. Commander of Jägala concentration camp. Died on 6 September 1960 Canada. | | | |
| Bruno Lohse | Born 17 September 1911. Goering's Reichsleiter Rosenberg Taskforce in Paris. Died 19 March 2007 | | 1933 | |
| Dr. Franz Lucas | Born 15 September 1911, in Osnabrück, Germany. Assigned to KZ Auschwitz. Died 7 December 1994, in Elmshorn, Germany | 350030 | 15 November 1937 | |
| Maximilian Léon Malmedy | Born 8 August 1916. Dutch/French SS volunteer and 5 SS Wiking armored platoon officer. Recipient of the Knight's Cross to the Iron Cross. Awarded 8 March 1945. Died 4 December 1959. | | 11 January 1941 | |
| Gottfried Meir | Involved in killing of Ettore Ovazza family 11 October 1944, Meir was charged in 1954 in Klagenfurt but found not guilty. He was however convicted in absentia by a military court in Turin in 1955 and sentenced for life but never extradited. | | | |
| Ernst Misselwitz | He became a trusted agent of the Sicherheitsdienst (SD), and led numerous operations against the French Resistance. Ernst Misselwitz ran the interrogation and torture chamber in Paris Gestapo HQ. Before working in Paris, Misselwitz worked shortly in the Gestapo HQ in Lyon. With the Liberation of Paris on 25 August 1944, Misselwitz fled to Germany. In October 1945, the 36-year-old Misselwitz reported to the French security services. Misselwitz was arrested and imprisoned for a short time, and offered to be a spy among the inmates, starting in early 1946. In 1952 Misselwitz was convicted in a Paris court in absentia, he was sentenced to five years imprisonment for the torture of Brossolett, but was never found or arrested, as after his release he became a secret agent for the French special services. | | | |
| Heinz Müller | Born 27 July 1915 | 193096 | | |
| Rudolf Neugebauer | Born 21.12.1912. Usf 12.3.38 with SDHA 1938; 1941, promotion to KK of KK z.Pr. Neugebauer, Stapo Darmstadt. BBL 14/41; head of the Vilnius Gestapo 2–42 till 10–43; shot and killed Jacob Gens 14 September 1943;1945, SS-Hstuf KK Rolf Neugebauer, Stapo Darmstadt, "abgeordnet zum Befehlshaber der Sicherheitspolizei und des SD (BdS) Ungarn", awarded KVK I m.S. BBL 4/45 | 266047 | | 1086615 |
| Josef Oberhauser | Born 21 January 1915. Served in SS Guard Detachment at KZ Belzec. Postwar 1948 sentenced to 15 years in prison and 10 years deprivation of civil rights; given amnesty and released 1956. 1964 sentenced to 4.5 years in prison-released after serving half his sentence. Died 22 November 1979 | 288.121 | November 1935 | |
| Karlis Ozols | Born 1912. Commanded a Latvian/SD murder commando in Minsk Ghetto and Ghettos of Slutzk and Riga Ghetto. In August 1943 commanded 4th Company of the 282-A. Schutzmannschaft Battalion in Rīga. Transferred to the Lettisches Freiwilligen Polizei Regiment 2 as the III Battalion on 4 February 1944 of the Latvian Legion. Died 2001 in Australia | | | |
| Friedrich Peter | Born on 13 July 1921. During the Second World War, he was deployed on the Western and Eastern Fronts, most recently as SS-Obersturmführer with the 10th Infantry Regiment of the 1st SS Infantry Brigade. Parts of this unit were assigned to Einsatzgruppe C in the summer of 1941. Peter's unit killed at least 17,000 Jews and around 25,000 Soviet prisoners of war in 1941. Also in 1941, Peter received the Iron Cross Second Class. Leader of the Freedom Party of Austria (FPÖ). Died on September 25, 2005 | 466,738 | 1938 | |
| Richard Reinhard Ferdinand Pruchtnow | Born 8 April 1892. Member of SD-section OST and SD-section III. Died 22 June 1943 | 27.487 | November 1931 | 531.273 |
| Franz Rademacher | Born 20 February 1906. German Foreign Office official involved in the Shoah. Died 17 March 1973 | | | |
| Hans Reisser | Member of RBK. Helped burn Hitler's and Eva Braun's bodies May 1945. | | | |
| Pio Filippani Ronconi | Born 10 March 1910. Volunteer for the Waffen-SS. Died 11 February 2010 | | | |
| Hermann Schaper | Born 12 August 1911. He was a Holocaust perpetrator responsible for atrocities committed by the Einsatzgruppen in German-occupied Poland and the Soviet Union and was convicted after the war of numerous war crimes. Charged in 1964. Legal proceedings against him were terminated on 2 September 1965 despite his positive identification by the courts. He was retried in Germany in 1976 for other crimes against Poles and Jews and was sentenced to six years in prison, however following an appeal this was overturned and his health was declared too fragile for a new trial. On 10 April 2002, Hermann Schaper was interrogated in Germany in the presence of a Polish prosecutor in connection with the investigation into the pogrom in Jedwabne conducted at the time by the Institute of National Remembrance. He was unable to ask most of the questions prepared because the court doctor declared the witness unfit to participate in the proceedings. Reported to have died in his nineties in 2002 | 3484 | 1937 | 105606 |
| Erwin Schmidt | Born 22 November 1903. SS-Ustuf. 9.11.36 SS-Ostuf. 30.1.38 SD-Hauptamt. Member of the Lebensborn Association. Holder of the SA Sports Badge | 35133 | | 1 098 891 |
| Johann Schwarzhuber | Born 29 August 1904. KZ Auschwitz and KZ Ravensbruck. Tried and executed 3 May 1947 | 142.388 | 5 May 1933 | 1.929.969 |
| Walter Sohst | Born 23 February 1898. Member of SD-section OST and SD-section III. Died 14 November 1964 | 36.087 | 1 September 1932 | 1.090.541 |
| Hans Sommer | Born 26 June 1914. Worked with Police in France. GDR agent after the war, as a Stasi agent planted into the post-war Gehlen Organization. Died 31 October 1987. | 119 157 | 1 December 1932 | 1442457 |
| Tscherim Soobzokov | Entered Nazi service in 1942 in the Schutzmannschaft in the North Caucasus, participating in the murder of civilians. Starting in 1943 served as military recruiter, most likely for the Ostlegionen. Escaped via Vatican and CIA ratlines to the US after the war. died 6 September 1985 | | 1943 | |
| Hans Stern | Served in 11th SS Volunteer Panzergrenadier Division Nordland and SS Brigade Westfalen | | | |
| Arnold Strippel | Born 6 February 1911 Unhausen. b. III Wachtruppe Sachsen: 1 June 1934 – 1938. b. 3 SS-TSta Thüringen: 1938–1941. 1941–1942 Stabsscharführer at Natzweiler commandant's office. Feldführer / KZ Lublin u. 2 Lagerführer: June 1942 – 5 July 1943. KZ Ravensbrück: 7.1943. Lagerführer KZ Herzogenbusch: 7.43–10.44. KZ Neuengamme: 10.44–5.45. (also involved with KZ Auschwitz; Sachsenburg; Buchenwald; Majanek). Involved in Bullenhuser Damm killings in 1945. Frankfurt sentence 21x life imprisonment + 10 Jahre imprisonment 1.6.1949; released 21.4.1969. Frankfurt sentence to the same sentence before + 121'500 Mark fine 8.1969. Majdanek 3 sentence 3 years + 3 months. Imprisonment 30.6.1981. Died 1995 in Frankfurt-Kalbach | 236290 | | 4334442 |
| Anton Thumann | Schutzhaftlagerführung Gross-Rosen concentration camp, Neuengamme concentration camp | 24.444 | | 1.726.633 |
| Hans Tidow | SS-Obersturmführer der Waffen-SS | 3087 | | 124.424 |
| Walter Trautwein | Born 21 November 1910 Mannheim. SA member 1929–1934; served with Kripo (former mechanic); commissioned SS-Ustuf. on 20 Apr.1938; DAL Dec.1938=SD-Hauptamt; promoted SS-Ostuf. 20 Apr.1939; Einsatzkommando B – in Poland Sep. 1939; promoted on 20 April 1940; RSHA Sipo Trier. Missed 1 October 1944 Wloszczowa | 107112 | | 210651 |
| Norbert Berghe von Trips | Born 18.1.1912 Graz. Referat IV D (Ausgewanderters, zak³adnicy.) Participated in executions of Poles and Jews in the Warsaw Ghetto ruins. Died 6.6.1980 | 281 072 | | |
| Paul Werner | Born 12.10.1895. Usf 20.4.35 Osf 11.9.38 attached to Stammabteilung Bezirk 16 | 45847 | | 1434282 |
| Walter Witossek | Born 03.02.1901 in Dresden. KdS Warschau. Participated in executions of Poles and Jews in the Warsaw Ghetto ruins. Died in hospital in Wroclaw | | | |
| Friedrich Wolffhardt | Born 7 December 1899. In April 1941, he was commissioned on the proposal of Martin Bormann, who was friends with him, to set up a library within the framework of the "Guide Library" (Sonderauftrag) of Linz. [He was also associated with Professor Hans Posse). He headed the collection point for the library as part of the party law firm in Munich's Führer building. The collection point was moved in August 1943 to the former Villa of Camillo Castiglioni to Grundlsee near Bad Aussee, which stored books 1944/45 in the Salt mine Altaussee. On 21 February 1945, he was called to war service at his own request and has been missing since 1945. | | | |

=== Untersturmführer (second lieutenant) ===
| Name | Position | SS number | Joined SSĠě | Party number |
|---|---|---|---|---|
Untersturmführer (1921–1945)
| Woldemar / Waldemar Amelung | Born 11.11.1914 Kopjoni, Russia. Served in Latvian Army 1933–1934. Assignments: EG A, RSHA III B; head of Hauptaußenstelle SIPO and the SD in Baranowitschi, VI 1942 – 11 X 1943. [Possibly participated in reprisals after Unternehmen "Hermann" (August 1943) and especially in the execution of 11 nuns?] SS-Ostuf. 9.11.1944, (SD). 1944–1945, worked in RSHA III B – Wlassow Dienststelle. Died on 19 XII 1954 in Paderborn | 357294 | 01.02.1940 | 8537705 |
| Heinrich Andergassen | Born 30 July 1908. Tried and executed 26 July 1946 in killing US Soldier Roderick Stephen Hall and murders of six other Allied soldiers | | | |
| Rudolf Roy | Born 15 August 1920. 1st SS Panzer Division Leibstandarte SS Adolf Hitler & 12th SS Panzer Division Hitlerjugend. Awarded the Knight's Cross of the Iron Cross. Destroyed 36 enemy tanks with his gunner, Unterscharführer Fritz Eckstein. Roy was killed during the Battle of the Bulge. He is buried in the War cemetery in Bonn-Bad Godesberg, Germany, grave number 756. | | | |
| Bernhard Anhalt, | Defendant in 1957 trial of March 1945 Amsberger Massacre (acquitted) | | | |
| Johann Appler | | | | 95.219 |
| Karl Peter Berg | Born 18 April 1907. Lagerführer KZ Amersfoort. Captured tried and executed by firing squad 22 November 1949 | | | |
| Kort Paul Hans Bläse | Born 26.05.1900. Sipo Rotterdam. Sentenced to 20 years imprisonment 28.03.1949 in Den Haag. Released 29.03.1956 | | | |
| Herbert Böttcher | Born 5.6.1913 Gunsdorf | 8.134 | | 276774 |
| Wilhelm Boger | Born 19 December 1906 Zuffenhausen. Police commissioner and member of the Political Department at Auschwitz; arrested 1959; tried 1965 later convicted of crimes against humanity; died in prison 3 April 1977 Bietigheim-Bissingen | 2779 | 1930 | 153652 |
| Dr. Karl Brandt | Born 8 January 1904. Promoted 20 April 1939. Postwar tried for war crimes and executed 2 June 1948 | 193764 | | |
| Erhard Brauny | Sentenced to life in prison for the 1945 Gardelegen Massacre; died of Lukemina in 1950 | | | |
| Dr. Heinz Brücher | Born 14 January 1915. Member of SS Ahnenerbe; botanist. Died 17 December 1991 | | | 3498152 |
| Prince Christoph of Hesse | Reserve captain at RFSS staff. Luftwaffe major | 35903 | | 1498608 or 696176 |
| Paul Dickopf | Born 9 June 1910. Wartime member of SD. Postwar president of Interpol. Died 19 September 1973 | 337259 | 1937 | |
| Kurt Hermann August Döring | Sipo Amsterdam (IV A and IV B), Kriminalobersekretär, SS-Untersturmführer. Sentenced to 3 years imprisonment 01.07.1949 in Amsterdam. Released 23.08.1950 | | | |
| Benson Railton Metcalf Freeman | Born 6 October 1903. Lt RAF captured 22 May 1940; 1942-1944 worked for Germans in propaganda. In October 1944 joined Waffen-SS. Captured 9 May 1945 and sentenced to ten years in prison. Subsequent life unknown. | | | |
| Dr. Hermann Gauch | Born 6 May 1899. Nazi Race theorist. Died 7 November 1978 | 222.175 | 1934 | 9.538 (1922); 3.474.227 (1934) |
| Kurt Gildisch | Born 2 March 1904. 3rd commander of SS-Begleitkommando des Führers 1933–1934. Died 3 March 1956 | 13.138 | 29 September 1931 | 690.762 |
| Maximilian Grabner | Born 2 October 1905. Gestapo agent and head of the Political Department at Auschwitz-infamous leader of Block 11; later executed for crimes against humanity on 28 January 1948 | | September 1938 | 1214137 |
| Kurt Graaf | Member of the SD-Section III | | | |
| Richard Gutkaes | Member of SD-section III | | | |
| Rudolf Hassel | Head Sipo Amsterdam (department IV-B4); Kriminalsekretär. Reported arrested in the Netherlands | | | |
| Ludwig Heinemann | Born 03/01/1911. Promoted to SS-Untersturmführer on 12–09–1937 | 44.482 | | 67.453 |
| Fritz Henke | SS-Oberscharführer | | | |
| Johann Klier | Guard Sobibor extermination camp. Testified 1950 trial of Hermann Erich Bauer | | | |
| Karl Wilhelm Franz Klünner | Born 08.03.1904 in Elmschenhagen. Sipo Assen, Kriminalsekretär; SS-Untersturmführer. Sentenced to 16 years imprisonment 20.04.1949 in Den Haag. Released 23.05.1955 | | | |
| Ernst Knorr | Born 13.10.1899 in Heiligenbeil. Sipo Groningen, SS-Untersturmführer. Suicide 07.07.1945 in Scheveningen prison | | | |
| Georg Kruger | Born 05 XI 1898 Karlowitz/Karłowice. SS-Untersturmführer and Kriminalobersekretär; head of Unter Referat IV B4 (Judenangelegenheiten). [Warsaw]. Died 16 II 1945 Poznań | | | |
| Wolfgang Kügler | Was an SS-Untersturmführer (Second Lieutenant) and a Teilkommandoführer (detachment leader) for Einsatzkommando 2, a subdivision of Einsatzgruppe A. In April 1943, Kügler was replaced by SS-Obersturmbannführer Kurt Jurgschait. According to a post-war trial in Germany, the reasons for his removal were the theft of property that once belonged to murdered Jews. He was also suspected of being too friendly with Latvians, including his lover and interpreter, Mrs. Kronbergs. The most serious charge against him was that he had organized and been a commandter at the massacre of about 2,700 Jews, mostly women and children, on the beach at Liepāja, Latvia. Following World War II, he was tried and found guilty of war crimes in West Germany. His sentence was reported to have been 8 months in prison and a fine. In 1959 he was rearrested and charged with the Schedde Beach Massacre. After being rearrested, Kügler committed suicide by jumping out of a prison window in Frankfurt am Main on 2 December 1959 | | | |
| Walter Kutschmann | Born 24 July 1914. Kriminalkommisar/Gestapo Chief in Drobohycz. After being identified as living in Argentina by Simon Wiesenthal arrested on 28 June 1975; he was later released on 29 June 1975. Rearrested in 1985; Kutschmann died in prison hospital 30 August 1986 | 404651 | 1940 | 7475729 |
| Célestin Lainé | Born 1908. Leader of the Bezen Perrot. Fled from a post war sentence of death. Died 1983 Dublin, Ireland | | | |
| Walter Wilhelm Lehne | Born 19.03.1891 in Magdeburg. Police and Gestapo Reichsführerschule SS in Prag. Gestapo-Leitstelle in Hamburg-Altona. 1936 Grenzpolizeikommissariat Flensburg. 1938 political surveillance of workers on the Siegfried Line. Summer 1939-1945 deputy head of department Gestapo Pardubice. Death sentence in Waldheim 1950. Not executed because extradited to Czechoslovakia. Extradited 15.11.1950 to Czechoslovakia | | | |
| Hermann Maringgele | SS-Hauptscharführer and Zugführer | | | |
| Martin James Monti | Born 24 October 1921. US Army Air Corps deserter/airplane thief and SS propaganda officer; member of SS-Standarte Kurt Eggers; in 1946 courtmartialed for stealing a plane and deseration-sentenced to 15 years [sentence suspended] served in Army Air Force 1947–1948; rearrested 1948 and charged with treason; sentenced to 25 years; paroled 1960. Died 11 September 2000 | | 1945 | |
| Dr. Hans Münch | Born 14 May 1911-died about 2001. Assigned to KZ Auschwitz | | | |
| Kārlis Mūsiņš | Waffen-SS Untersturmführer | | | |
| Johann Niemann | Born 4 August 1913. Deputy commandant of Sobibor extermination camp. Executed in revolt 14 October 1943 | 270.600 | 1934 | 753.836 |
| Rudolf August Oetker | Born 20 September 1916 Bielefeld, Germany. Became a Ustuf 21.6.44. Died 16 January 2007 Hamburg Germany. | | | |
| Hans Öllinger | Born 7 September 1914 in Mühlbach am Hochkönig. From June 1933 to autumn 1937, also during the "prohibition period" after the failed July Putsch, he was a member of the SA and finally Sturmführer. He took part in terrorist acts against the Austrofascist government; and member of the SS Death's Head Associations. After the "Anschluss" in 1938, Öllinger joined the Landesbauernschaft Südmark (Styria, Carinthia, including East Tyrol and southern Burgenland) and became a member of the NSDAP in May 1938. As an alpinist, he was a member of two mountain divisions and, according to Simon Wiesenthal, took part in flamethrower commandos, "fire brigades" that killed survivors after storming villages. WAs (Minister of Agriculture) in Bruno Kreisky government. Died 15 June 1990 in Klagenfurt | 297,660 | 1937 | |
| Alfred Otto | Born 02.03.1900 Lodz. Gestapo Warsaw Referat IV A 3 c. Hiding in Paczków after the war. Trial at Warsaw in 1955. Sentenced to life imprisonment, later commuted to 25 years. Died 1968 in Warsaw prison | | | |
| Horst Petri | Born March 18, 1913. In Poland and Ukraine, Horst participated in hunting down partisans, massacring local Jewish population in a town next to his estate, and participated in the mass deportations. Arrested 1960. Executed December 12, 1962 Leipzig Prison. His wife and accomplice Erna Kürbs was released from prison in 1992 and died in July 2000 | | 1934 | |
| Josef Pospichil | Born December 1899. Member of SD-section III/Gestapo. Involved KZ Majdanek; KZ Natzweiler-Struthof. Executed 14 February 1948 | 53.675 | 16 August 1932 | 1.096.992 |
| Josef Rademacher | Born 26 Aug. 1912 Völkingen/Saar. Sipo/SD. Promoted SS-Ustuf. on 9 November 1941. Befehlshaber der Sicherheitspolizei und des SD (BdS) Hungary. Missed December 1944 Budapest | 29003 | | 887628 |
| Wilhelm Karl Johannes Rosenbaum | Born 27 April 1915. Involved in killings at Bad Rabka. Arrested 1961; tried 1968 and sentenced to life; released 1982. Died 1984 | | 1 July 1936 | |
| Willem Sassen | Born 16 April 1918. Netherlands PK ("Propaganda Kompanie"). Died 2002 | | | |
| Willi Schatz | Dentist at Auschwitz concentration camp | | | |
| Heinz Schildt | Member of SD-section OST and SD-section III | | | |
| Hanns-Martin Schleyer | Born 1 May 1915. Leader of board of Zentralverband der Industrie in Prague. Kidnapped and killed 18 October 1977 | 221714 | 30 June 1933 | 5056527 |
| Fritz Scherwitz alias Elias Sirewitz | Born August 21, 1903, Schaulen, Lithuania. Member of German Freikorps 1919. In 1939, he came to Riga as a police officer. In 1942 he ran a workshop of the Riga-Kaiserwald concentration camp in Riga until September 1944. In 1945 he pretended to be a persecuted Jew. On behalf of the Americans, he now began to search for interned former SS men. At the beginning of 1946, Scherwitz succeeded in becoming trustee for several trading companies in the district of Wertingen (Bavaria). In January 1947, he was given the trusteeship of all Jews who had lived in the district until 1942. It was now his task to secure former property of Jews for possibly survivors or their heirs. On 19 December 1947 he became deputy counsellor for persecuted persons in the Swabian part of Bavaria. On April 26, 1948, he was arrested. On March 3, 1949, Scherwitz was sentenced to six years in prison in Munich for shooting three Jewish prisoners. The verdict was upheld by jury on appeals on 14 December 1949 and 1 August 1950. He was released from prison in 1954. Died in Munich, Germany, December 4, 1962 | | 1 November 1933 | |
| Hans Stark | Born 14 June 1921 in Darmstadt. KZ Sachsenhausen; Buchenwald; Dachau; Auschwitz. Arrested April 1959; tried 1963–1964; released from prison 1968. Died 29 March 1991 | 319918 | December 1937 | |
| Johann Friedrich Stöver | Born 8 August 1899. Lagerführer KZ Amersfoort. On 7 June 1949, Stöver was sentenced to life imprisonment by the Special Court in Amsterdam. He was detained in Breda. In 1950 he was sentenced to death by the Special Council of Cassation, but a year later this sentence was commuted to life imprisonment. In May 1959, the life sentence was changed to 23 years and four months. Stöver was released in November 1960 and returned to Germany. Subsequent fate unknown | | | |
| Wilhelm Ströbel | Stuttgart lawyer. | | | |
| Reimond Tollenaere | Waffen-SS Belgian Foreign Legion officer | | | |
| Lauri Törni | Finnish officer who joined the SS after the temporary peace treaty between Finland and the USSR, switching armies multiple times to continue combating communists. Ultimately ended his career as a Green Beret Major (posthumous) and US citizen in 1965 in Vietnam. Then named Larry Thorne, Törni is the only Waffen-SS member to be buried in Arlington National Cemetery. | | | |
| Friedrich Carl Ferdinand Viermann | Sipo Amsterdam, Kriminalsekretär, SS-Untersturmführer; sentenced to 7 years imprisonment 27.09.1949 in Amsterdam. Released 31.03.1956 | | | |
| Herbert Walther | Born 23 April 1922. Served in both the 1st SS Panzer Division Leibstandarte SS Adolf Hitler and 12th SS Panzer Division Hitler Youth. Wounded and captured in the Ardennes Battles December 1944. Postwar book editor and historian. Died 25 February 2003 | | | |
| Herbert Wenzel | Part of the "Werewolf" "Operation Carnival" in March 1945 which resulted in deaths of border guard Jozef Saive and Aachan Mayor Franz Oppenhoff. Wenzle changed his name to "Fritz Brandt" and died in Namibia in 1981. | | | |
| Paul Werner | SS Dutch legion member | 280216 | | 1293714 |
| Hans Walter Zech-Nenntwich | Born 10 July 1916. SS Cavalry Regiment member who was convicted for the killing of 5,200 Jews at the Pinsk Marshes and sentenced to four years in prison in 1964. | | | |
| Otto Wolnek | Born 5 June 1918 in Feldkirch, Austria. KZ Auschwitz. | | | |
| Heinz Zeuner | Defendant in 1957 trial of March 1945 Amsberger Massacre {Acquitted} | | | |

== SS Non-Commissioned Officers ==
=== Sturmscharführer (Regimental sergeant major) ===
| Name | Position | SS number | Joined SS | Party number |
|---|---|---|---|---|
Sturmscharführer (1934–1945)
| Johannes Wilhelm Hoffmann | Born 22.05.1904. Sipo Rotterdam, SS-Sturmscharführer, Kriminalsekretär; sentenced to death 11.04.1949. Commuted 13.07.1950. Released 21.11.1960 | | | |
| Martin Johann Kohlen | Born 14.08.1910. Sipo Rotterdam, SS-Sturmscharführer/Kriminalsekretär. Sentenced to life 11.03.1949. Commuted 23.03.1950 to 21 years and 11-month imprisonment. Released 10.12.1959 | | | |
| Karl Lamm | Born 18.11.1907 in Berlin. Sipo Assen, SS-Sturmscharführer. Sentenced to 20 years imprisonment 20.04.1949 in Den Haag (in absence) | | | |
| Adolf Maurer | SS security administrator of Sachsenhausen concentration camp | | | |

=== Hauptscharführer (sergeant major) ===
| Name | Position | SS number | Joined SS | Party number |
|---|---|---|---|---|
Hauptscharführer (1934–1945)
| Leopold Bruck | Commander of a Waffen-SS squad in France | | | |
| Kurt Brunow | Born 9 March 1907. Member of SD-section OST and SD-section III | | 1 November 1931 | 530.892 |
| Harold Cole | Born 24 January 1906. Ex British POW and double agent for the Sicherheitsdienst against the French Resistance. Killed 8 January 1946 | | | |
| Lorenz Hackenholt | Born 26 June 1914. SS-NCO in charge of gassing at Bełżec extermination camp; vanished May 1945; declared legally dead December 1945-fate unknown | | 1933 | 1727962 |
| Erich von der Heyde | Born 1 May 1900. During 1936, von der Heyde became the advisor for nitrogen and agriculture in the Political-Economic Policy Department (WIPO, Wirtschaftspolitische Abteilung) of the I.G. in Berlin. From mid-1938 he was also the counterintelligence operative of I.G. Farben's "NW 7" (intelligence) office, where his duties included counterintelligence and taking action against breaches of secrecy. In addition, he passed on reports from abroad that appeared to be of general interest, distributing them internally at the I.G. and sending them to the Wehrmacht. In this capacity, he was borrowed by the Reich Main Security Office (RSHA, Reichssicherheitshauptamt) and by 1940 had been promoted to Hauptscharführer. In September 1940, he was called up for service in the Wehrmacht, and until the war's end he served in the military-economic branch of the War Economy and Armament Office (Wehrwirtschafts- und Rüstungsamt; and later the War Economy Staff, or Wehrwirtschaftsstab). Acquitted in 1948 I.G. Farben trial. Died 5 August 1984 | | 1934 | |
| Hans Juhl | Head of the local Gestapo in the area around Helsingør (Elsinore) in Denmark from late summer 1943 | | | |
| Otto Kempin | Sipo Amsterdam (IV B 4), SS-Hauptscharführer. Sentenced to 10 years imprisonment 08.04.1950 in Amsterdam. Released 27.04.1951 | | | |
| Heinz Linke | Waffen-SS officer | | | |
| Pieter Menten | Born 26 May 1899. Involved in 1941 Massacre of Lviv professors. Also involved in the killing of Jews. In 1949 sentenced to 8 months for working in a uniform as a Nazi Interpreter. In 1951 Dutch Govt refused his extradition to Poland. In 1980 he was sentenced to 10 years for war crimes. Died 14 November 1987 | | | |
| Friedrich Meyerhoff | Born 05.03.1916 Völlenerfehn. KZ Vught. Sentenced to 13 years imprisonment 25.10.1949 in 's-Hertogenbosch. Released 01.03.1956 | | | |
| Otto Moll | Born 24 March 1915. KZ Auschwitz. Director and chief head of all crematoria. Commandant of Furstengrube and Gleiwitz I concentration camps. Executed 28 May 1946. | 267670 | 1 May 1935 | |
| Detlef Nebbe | Born 20 June 1912. KZ Auschwitz personnel. Sentenced to life by Supreme National Tribunal. Released by amnesty in the mid-1950s | | 1933 | |
| Richard Heinrich Nitsch | Born 01.11.1908 Todtgüslingen. Sipo Maastricht, SS-Hauptscharführer. Sentenced to life imprisonment 29.11.1948 in 's-Hertogenbosch. Commuted 18.04.1959 to 22 years and 9 months imprisonment; released 05.04.1960. Died 1990 | | | |
| Auke Bert Pattist | Born 1920, died 2001. SS sergeant | | | |
| Georg Schallermair | Born 29 December 1894. At subcamp Muehldorf August 1944 until 1945. In the Dachau Camp Trial (part of the Dachau Trials) he was sentenced to death by hanging. He was executed at Landsberg prison 7 June 1951. | | | |
| Walter Gerhard Martin Sommer | Born 8 February 1915. Hangman of KZ Buchenwald. Reduced in rank and sentenced to a penal Battalion. Taken POW by Red Army 1945. Status changed to war criminal 1950. Released and exchanged 1955. Indicted 1957 and found guilty of war crimes 1958. Died 7 June 1988 in prison | 110035 | 15 May 1934 | 294863 |
| Gustav Sorge | Born 24 April 1911. KZ Esterwegen concentration camp Sachsenhausen concentration camp died in prison 1978 | | 1931 | |
| Gustav Franz Wagner | Born 18 July 1911 in Vienna Austria. Deputy commander of the Sobibór extermination camp. Wagner also served in Italy with other SS-Men from Operation Reinhard in Anti-Partisan activity. Wagner was awarded the War Merit Cross 2nd Class With Swords for his service. Died 3 October 1980 in Brazil. | | 1931 | 443217 |

=== Oberscharführer (staff sergeant) ===
| Name | Position | SS number | Joined SS | Party number |
|---|---|---|---|---|
Oberscharführer (1932–1945)
| Ernst Barkmann | Born 25 August 1919. Waffen-SS tank commander. Died 27 June 2009 | | | |
| Hermann Erich Bauer | Born 26 March 1900. In charge of gas chambers at Sobibor extermination camp. In prison 1950–1980. Died 4 February 1980 | | | |
| Rudolf Beckmann | Born 20 February 1910. Action T4; Sobibor extermination camp; killed in revolt 14 October 1943 | | | |
| Kurt Bolender | Born 21 May 1912. In charge of gas chambers at Sobibor extermination camp; Action T4 died 10 October 1966 | | | |
| Derk-Elsko Bruins | Born 20 March 1923. Dutch Collaborator who joined the Waffen-SS. Awarded the Knight's Cross Medal. Died 5 February 1986 Germany. Brother of Siert Bruins | | | |
| Franz Bürkl | Deputy commander and infamous executioner at Pawiak Prison, Warsaw, Poland. Executed by Polish Underground 7 September 1943 | | | |
| Wilhelm Emmerich | Born 7 February 1916. Assigned KZ Auschwitz. Shot and wounded by Franciszka Mann 23 October 1943. Died 22 May 1945 of typhus | | | |
| Paul Felsko | Assigned east Poland governorship. Died in soviet prison camp 15 April 1952. | | | |
| Karl Frenzel | Born 20 August 1911. T-4 program and KZ Sobibor in prison 1966–1982. Died 2 September 1996 | | | 334948 |
| Bruno Gesche | Born 5 November 1905. A commander of SS-Begleitkommando des Führers; demoted from Obersturmbannführer 20 December 1944 for drunkenness; member of Dirlewanger Brigade. Died 1980 | 1093 | | 8592 |
| Hubert Gomerski | Guard at Sobibor extermination camp. Testified 1950 trial of Hermann Erich Bauer | | | |
| Siegfried Graetschus | Born 9 June 1916. KZ Sobibor-commanded Ukrainian guard, killed in revolt 14 October 1943 | | 20 Dec 1935 | |
| Heinrich Harrer | Born 6 July 1912. Austrian mountaineer and explorer in Tibet. Died 7 January 2006 | 73.896 | 1 April 1938 | 6.307.081 |
| Heinrich Heering | Born 29 July 1902 Reelkirchen. SS-Hscha. 12./LSSAH 01.41; SS-Ostuf. Nachsch.1 07.43; Ost IV.SS-Pz.Korps 11.44 | 50355 | | 64158 |
| Georg Heidorn | Kriminalassistent (from Grenzpolizei Eupen-Malmedy). Involved in "Operation Carnival" March 1945 which resulted in death of Dutch Border Guard Jozef Saive and Aachen Mayor Franz Oppenhoff. In 1949 sentenced to 1 year in prison; on 22.09.1952 LG Aachen reduced to 8 months. | | | |
| Karl Heinz Hennemann | Kriminalassistent (from Grenzpolizei Eupen-Malmedy). Involved in "Operation Carnival" March 1945 which resulted in death of Dutch Border Guard Jozef Saive and Aachen Mayor Franz Oppenhoff. In 1949 sentenced to 1 year in prison; on 22.09.1952 LG Aachen reduced to 8 months. | | | |
| Heinrich Heering | Born 29 July 1902 Reelkirchen. SS-Hscha. 12./LSSAH 01.41; SS-Ostuf. Nachsch.1 07.43;Ost IV.SS-Pz.Korps 11.44 | 50355 | | |
| Frank Hermes | Born 29 August 1919. Anglo-German ethnic. Served in 8th Company, Totenkopf Infantry Regiment; and the Panzer and Grenadier Training Battalion of the LSSAH; Also alleged to have been involved in the Shoah. In January 1946 sentenced to hang for high treason. Sentence commuted and served 7 years in prison until January 1953. Died 1987 | | | |
| Georg Huber | Born 1914 Weigendorf. KZ Vught. Sentenced to 15 years imprisonment 09.11.1948 in 's-Hertogenbosch, released 04.09.1951 | | | |
| Karl Heinrich Klaustermeyer | Born 22 February 1914. Involved in suppression of Warsaw Ghetto Uprising of 1943. 1965 sentenced to life in prison. Pardoned 8 April 1976 because of terminal cancer; died 21 April 1976 | | | |
| Hermann Michel | Born 23 April 1912. T-4; KZ Sobibor; Operation Reinhard-fate unknown-fled to Middle East? died 1984? [unconfirmed] | | | |
| Rochus Misch | Born 29 July 1917. Hitler's telephone operator who in the last weeks of the war handled all of the direct communication in the Führerbunker. Died 5 September 2013 | | 1937 | |
| Johannes Mittag | Born 5 March 1919. Joined Waffen-SS, Verfügungstruppe then Leibstandarte Adolf Hitler (LSSAH) 1939. Deployed mainly alongside Div. Nord in Karelia and Scandinavia. Prior part of Battles of Dunkirk, EKI, EKII, Sturmabzeichen Silber, Verwundenenabzeichen Schwarz. Died 6 August 2005. | | | |
| Eric Muhsfeldt | Born 18 February 1913. Senior NCO of the Auschwitz Sonderkommando. Involved in Operation Harvest Festival. Hanged 28 January 1948 | | | |
| Josef Oberhauser | Born 21 January 1915. Involved Action T-4 and Bełżec extermination camp. In Belzec Trial sentenced to 4.5 years. Died 22 November 1979 | 288.121 | November 1935 | |
| Johann Pauls | Born 9 February 1908. Executed 4 July 1946 for war crimes | | 1 April 1931 | |
| Walter Quakernack | Born 9 July 1907. Executed 11 October 1946 for war crimes | 125266 | 1933 | |
| Herbert Scherpe | Born 20 May 1907. Stationed at KZ Auschwitz. Arrested August 1961 and sentenced to four and a half years in prison for "joint aid to the common murder" and to the loss of civil honour rights to four years. He was released on 19 August 1965. Died 23 December 1997 | | 1931 | |
| Josef Schillinger | Assigned KZ Auschwitz. Shot and killed by Franciszka Mann 23 October 1943. | | | |
| Karl Silberbauer | Born 21 June 1911. Vienna Gestapo; SD at the Hague; arrested Anne Frank; postwar recruited by the Federal Intelligence Service (Germany) to infiltrate neo-Nazi and pro-soviet groups. Died 2 Sept 1972 | | 1943 | |
| Martin Weiss | Born 21 February 1903 Karlsruhe. He was assigned to Einsatzkommando 3, part of Einsatzgruppe stationed in Bad Düben. In October 1941 he was assigned to work in the Office of the Commander of Security Police (Sicherheitsdienst or SD and Security Police (Sicherheitspolizei or Sipo) in Vilnius, Lithuania, then part of the Reichskommissariat Ostland. Was also de facto commander of the Vilna Ghetto. He was also the commander of the notorious Nazi-sponsored Ypatingasis būrys (Lithuanian special SD and German Security Police Squad), which was largely responsible for the Ponary massacre where up to 100,000 Jews were shot to death. In February 1950, a court in Würzburg found him guilty of war crimes and sentenced him to life imprisonment. In 1970, his sentence was suspended and revoked in 1977; died 1984 | | 1934 | |

=== Scharführer (sergeant) ===
| Name | Position | SS number | Joined SS | Party number |
|---|---|---|---|---|
Scharführer (1925–1945)
| Heinz Auerswald | Born 26 July 1908. In Ordnungspolizei held the rank of Oberwachtmeister – equivalent to Scharführer. He was "Kommissar für den jüdischen Wohnbezirk" ("Commissioner for the Jewish Residential District") in Warsaw Ghetto, Poland from April 1941 to November 1942. Postwar investigation stopped after he died 5 December 1970 | 216.399 | 7 June 1933 | 4.830.479 |
| Heinrich Eicke | Camp administrator Maly Trostenets extermination camp. Fled to Argentina-all trace of him lost | | | |
| Erich Fuchs | Born 9 April 1902. Involved T-4 and KZ Sobibor. Fuchs was put on trial at the Bełżec Trial in Munich 1963–64, for which he was acquitted. Fuchs was rearrested and tried at the Sobibor Trial in Hagen. He was charged with participation in the mass murder of approximately 3,600 Jews. On 20 December 1966, Fuchs was found guilty of being an accessory to the mass murder of at least 79,000 Jews and sentenced to four years imprisonment. Fuchs was married for the sixth time during the trial. Fuchs died on 25 July 1980 | | 1934 | |
| Josef Hirtreiter | Born 1 February 1909. KZ Treblina. Sentenced to life 1951. Released 1977. Died 27 November 1978 | | | |
| Samuel Kunz | Born 1922. Volksdeutsche who served in USSR army; captured and trained as an SS Guard at Trawniki SS training camp. Posted to KZ Belzec death camp. Arrested in Berlin Germany July 2010 charged with being involved aiding deaths of 430,000 Jews and personally killing 10; died 18 November 2010 age 89 before trial could start. | | | |
| Erich Lachmann | Born 6 November 1909. Assigned KZ Sobibor. Tried for war crimes 1965–1966 but acquitted on grounds of mental incompence. Died 23 January 1972 | | | |
| Heinrich Freiherr von Stackelberg | Born 31 October 1905. Economics Professor. Died 12 October 1946 | | 1933 | |
| {?] Zummach | On 2 July 1934 killed SS-Oberabschnittsreiterführer Anton von Hohberg and Buchwald | | | |

=== Unterscharführer (corporal) ===
| Name | Position | SS number | Joined SS | Party number |
|---|---|---|---|---|
Unterscharführer (1934–1945)
| Julius Benz | Born 28 March 1924. SS-Karstwehr Battalion KIA 19 February 1944 | | | |
| Perry Broad | Born 25 April 1921. KZ Auschwitz personnel. Released in 1947, he again was arrested 12 years later, freed in December 1960 after the payment of DM 50,000 as surety and again arrested in November 1964 as a defendant in the Frankfurt Auschwitz Trials. He was found guilty of supervising selections at Birkenau, as well as of participating in interrogations, tortures and executions, and was sentenced to four years in prison in 1965. In 1979 in Wuppertal, Broad was among those interviewed and secretly filmed by Claude Lanzmann for Shoah, his Holocaust documentary released in 1985. Died 28 November 1993. | | 1941 | |
| Siert Bruins | Born 2 March 1921 in the Netherlands. 1943 became a German citizen. Killed Dutchman Aldert Klaas Dijkema in September 1944. Member of Sipo in Delfzijl, the Netherlands, from 1944 to 1945. Lived in Germany which refused to extradite him to Netherlands. In 1980 sentenced to seven years for killing two Jewish brothers in April 1945. In 2013 age 92 tried in German Court for Dijkema killing. Died 28 September 2015. | | | |
| Rudolph Erler | Born 31 August 1904. 5 Company/SS Totenkopfsturmbann. KZ Auschwitz I. Killed in Auschwitz revolt 7 October 1944 | | | |
| Willi Freese | Born 30 September 1921. 2 Company/SS Totenkopfsturmbann. KZ Auschwitz I. Killed in Auschwitz revolt 7 October 1944 | | | |
| Oskar Gröning | Born 10 June 1921. Joined the SS in 1940. In Auschwitz from 1942 to 1944. Captured 1945, released 1947/1948. Tried at age 93 on 20 April 2015 charged with aiding in killing of 300,000 of 425,000 Hungarian Jews. Found guilty and sentenced to four years in prison. Died 9 March 2018. | | | |
| Reinhold Hanning | Born 28 December 1921. Joined the Waffen-SS at age 18. Served two years in Auschwitz. Tried at age 94 in June 2016 charged with being an accessory to killing of 170,000. Found guilty and sentenced to five years in prison. Died 30 May 2017 | | 1940 | |
| Gerhard Hirsch | Born 13.07.1922. SS-Karstwehr Battalion KIA 19.02.1944 | | | |
| Albert Hujar/Huyar | Directed executions at Kraków-Płaszów concentration camp | | | |
| George Kettmann | Born 2 December 1898 in Amsterdam – died 10 February 1970 in Roosendaal | | | |
| Jozef Kindel | Born 23.10.1912 in Köln. Sipo Groningen. Died 05.08.1948 in prison Almelo (before his trial) | | | |
| Mathias Kirmaier | Born 1920. SS-Karstwehr Battalion KIA 19.02.1944 | | | |
| Josef Leitgeb, | Part of the "Werewolf" "Operation Carnival" in March 1945 which resulted in deaths of border guard Jozef Saive and Aachan Mayor Franz Oppenhoff. Killed by a landmine 27 March 1945. | | | |
| Franz Maierhofer | SS-Karstwehr Battalion KIA 18.02.1944 | | | |
| August Miete | Born 01.11.1908. KZ Treblina. Tried 1965. Died in detention 25 July 1978 | | | |
| Gustav Münzberger | Born 17.08.1903. KZ Treblina. Tried 1965, released 1971. Died 23 March 1977 | 321.758 | 1938 | |
| Harald Nugiseks | Born 22 October 1921. Member of Estonian Legion. Awarded Knight's Cross of the Iron Cross. Died 2 January 2014 | | | |
| Pierre Paoli | Born 31 December 1921. Executed 15 June 1946 | | | |
| Josef Purke | Born 28.02.1903. 1 Company/SS Totenkopfsturmbann. KZ Auschwitz I. Killed in Auschwitz revolt 7 October 1944 | | | |
| Josef Riegler | Born 5 July 1922; Guard KZ Mauthausen; executed 27 May 1947 Landsberg Prison | | | |
| Franz Schönhuber | Born 10 January 1923. Age 19 Waffen-SS member; later chairman of The Republicans political party. Died 27 November 2005 | | | |
| Herbert Schmidt | Born 04.04.1920. SS-Fallschirmjäger. Awarded Knight's Cross of the Iron Cross. Shot and killed by a French sniper while sitting beside his cousin and division commander, though thought to be a runway from lack of belongings and the disappearance of his wife. KIA June 16, 1944 | | | |
| Franz Suchomel | Born 3 December 1907. Treblinka, Tried 1965 and sentenced to 4 years. Died 18 December 1979 | | | |
| Eugène Vaulot | Born 1923 Paris. Served in 33rd Waffen Grenadier Division of the SS Charlemagne (1st French). Awarded Knight's Cross of the Iron Cross. Killed in action on 2 May 1945 | | | |
| Anton Weissensteiner | Born 1 January 1913 in Neunkirchen. Member of the Burgenland State Parliament by Gauleiter Tobias Portschy on March 15, 1938, and became district leader of Voitsberg in June 1938. Joined Waffen-SS 1 April 1940. He trained as an Unterscharführer (junior squad leader) at the SS NCO School in Lublinitz, Silesia. He went to France with his unit but did not participate in any combat there. On September 21, 1940, he was placed on leave of absence by the Gauleiter and returned to his position as district leader. He then served as district leader again from the end of 1940 until October or November 1941, after which he rejoined the Waffen-SS until February 1943, serving as a tank commander on the Eastern Front. Weissensteiner was awarded the Iron Cross Second Class and the Panzer Assault Badge. During his military service, Hubert Eissner served as his deputy district leader. Weissensteiner was indicted before the People's Court in 1948, as he was considered a "particular agitator" against the Jewish population of Mattersburg. Weissensteiner was charged with numerous crimes against the Jewish population, but was only convicted for illegality, his position as SA-Oberstummbannführer, Gau leader of the German Labor Front (DAF) Styria (from 1943), and his activities as district leader of Voitsberg (Section 1, Paragraph 6 of the War Crimes Act and Section 11 of the Prohibition Act). He was sentenced to ten years of hard labor and confiscation of his property. With credit given for time already served since May 30, 1945, he was released from prison on October 27, 1949. Died† 25 August 1987 in Langenzersdorf | | 1 April 1940 | 6,158,824 |
| Ernst Zierke | Born 6 May 1905. Involved in Action T4 Bełżec; Dorohucza; Sobibor Camp III. Acquitted in 1964 Belzec trial and released in 1965 Sobibor trial on health grounds. Died in 1972 | | | |

== SS-Stabsscharführer ==
| Name | Position | Nationality | Joined Nazi party | Joined SS | Years of service |
|---|---|---|---|---|---|
| Gerhard Putsch | Investigator for SS Judge Georg Konrad Morgen. "Disappeared" while investigating corruption in the SS | | | | |

== SS biologist ==
| Name | Position | Nationality | Joined Nazi party | Joined SS | Years of service |
|---|---|---|---|---|---|
| Professor Wolfgang Abel | Born 13 May 1905. Austrian anthropologist and one of Nazi Germany's racial biologists. Vienna native. Died 1 November 1997 | Austrian (Austria-Hungary) | 1933 | 1935 | 1933–1945 |

== SS-Kapellmeister ==
| Name | Position | Nationality | Joined Nazi party | Joined SS | Years of service |
|---|---|---|---|---|---|
| Hermann Paul Maximilian Abendroth | Born 19 January 1883. Leader of the Nazi Reichsmusikkammer. Died 29 May 1956 | German | 1934 | 1937 | 1934–1945 |

== SS-Schütze ==
| Name | Position | SS number | Joined SS | Party number |
|---|---|---|---|---|
Schütze (1939–1945)
| Gheorghe Catargiu | Born 7 February 1926. 8th SS Cavalary Division Florian Geyer (Rifleman) | | January 1944 | |
| Yaroslav Hunka | Born 19 March 1925 14th Waffen Grenadier Division of the SS (1st Galician). Resident of Canada: On 22 September 2023, Yaroslav Hunka, a Ukrainian Canadian who fought in the SS Division Galicia of the military wing of the Nazi Party, the Waffen-SS, was invited to the House of Commons of Canada to be recognized by Speaker Anthony Rota, the Member of Parliament for Hunka's district. Hunka received two standing ovations from all house members, including Canadian Prime Minister Justin Trudeau, other party leaders, and visiting Ukrainian President Volodymyr Zelenskyy. | | 1943 | |

== SS-Mann ==
| Name | Position | SS number | Joined SS | Party number |
|---|---|---|---|---|
Schütze (1939–1945)
| Alfried Felix Alwyn Krupp von Bohlen und Halbach | Born 13 August 1907. Förderndes Mitglied der SS; rank of Standartenführer National Socialist Flying Corps. In 1948, he was sentenced to twelve years in prison and the confiscation of all his assets for slave labour (use of forced labourers) and the plundering of economic assets in occupied foreign countries. In the indictment, he was also accused of planning a war of aggression and the associated conspiracy. Pardoned by John J. McCloy 31 January 1951. Died 30 July 1967 | | 1931 | 6,989,627 |
| Albert Speer | Born 19 March 1905. Appointed by order of Heinrich Himmler to Personal Staff of the Reichsführer-SS (Nazi conspiracy and aggression vol VI pp. 256); on 6 October 1942 SS Registration Office received a letter: "...Herewith we are returning the documentation of Reichsminister Speer with the endorsed certificate." Despite the endorsement, the letter continues, the certificate was not valid as "all personal details, including the obligatory medical for hereditary health, are lacking. As according to instructions from the Reichsführer-SS direct contact is prohibited, the matter is ordered shelved." Served 20 years in Spandau Prison for war crimes and released in 1966. Died 1 September 1981 | 46104 | 20 July 1942 | 474,481 |

== Unknown ==
| Name | Position | SS number | Joined SS | Party number |
|---|---|---|---|---|
Rank Unknown (please move these to the appropriate place if you find a citation)
| Gustav von Schmoller (1907–1991) | Born (7 February 1907. SS member and one of 5 lawyers in the economics branch of the Ministry of Economy and Labour in the Protectorate of Bohemia and Moravia. West German diplomat to Greece (1956–1960) and Turkey, ambassador to Sweden from 1964 to 1968. Outed as a Nazi in 1967. Died 11 February 1991 | | | |

== See also ==
- Glossary of Nazi Germany
- List of Nazi Party leaders and officials
- Nuremberg Trials
- Orpo rank
- RuSHA Trial
- Uniforms and insignia of the Schutzstaffel

== Notes ==
Former SS Ranks changed after 1934:

- SS rank Sturmhauptführer renamed Hauptsturmführer
- SS rank Sturmführer renamed Untersturmführer
- SS rank Obertruppführer renamed Hauptscharführer
- SS rank Truppführer renamed Oberscharführer
- SS rank Scharführer renamed Unterscharführer
- SS rank Haupttruppführer renamed Sturmscharführer
