= Hubertus Strughold =

German-American psychologist and human experimenter (1898–1986)

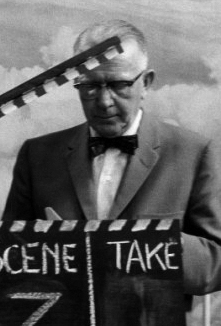
- Hubertus Strughold, c. 1953
- Born: June 15, 1898; Westtünnen-im-Hamm, Westphalia, German Empire
- Died: September 25, 1986 (aged 88); San Antonio, Texas, U.S.
- Citizenship: Germany; United States (1956)
- Education: Ludwig-Maximilians-Universität München; Georg August University of Göttingen; Westphalian Wilhelms-University in Münster; Julius Maximilian University of Würzburg
- Known for: Space medicine; Nazi human experimentation
- Scientific career
- Fields: Aviation medicine; space medicine; physiology

Hubertus Strughold (June 15, 1898 – September 25, 1986) was a German-American physiologist and medical researcher. Beginning in 1935 he served as chief of aeromedical research for Hermann Göring's Ministry of Aviation and later held the same position with the Luftwaffe throughout World War II. In 1947 he was brought to the United States as part of Operation Paperclip and went on to serve in a number of high-level scientific posts with the United States Air Force and NASA.

For his role in pioneering the study of the physical and psychological effects of crewed spaceflight he became known as "The Father of Space Medicine". Following his death, Strughold's activities in Germany during World War II came under greater scrutiny in the media and evidence of his involvement in Nazi human experimentation greatly damaged his legacy.

== Biography ==
=== Early life and academic career ===
Strughold was born in the town of Westtünnen-im-Hamm, in the Prussian province of Westphalia, on June 15, 1898. Strughold was the son of the elementary school principal Ferdinand Strughold (died: 1912) and his wife Anna, née Tillmann (1861–1931). After completing his studies at the Gymnasium Hammonensein in 1918, Strughold studied medicine and the natural sciences at the Georg August University of Göttingen, the Ludwig-Maximilians-Universität München and the Westphalian Wilhelms-University in Münster, where he earned his doctorate (Dr. phil.) in 1922. He obtained his medical degree (Dr. med. et phil.) from the Julius Maximilian University of Würzburg the following year. While continuing his studies at Würzburg, Strughold served as a research assistant to the eminent physiologist Dr. Maximilian von Frey and later to Dr. Paul Hoffmann at the Albert Ludwig University of Freiburg, completing his habilitation (Dr. med. habil.) in 1927.

After being named an associate professor of Physiology at Würzburg, Strughold's attention was increasingly drawn to the emerging science of aviation medicine and he collaborated with the famed World War I pilot Robert Ritter von Greim to study the effects of high-altitude flight on human biology. In 1928 Strughold traveled to the United States as part of a two year research fellowship sponsored by the Rockefeller Foundation. He would tour the medical laboratories at Harvard, Columbia and the Mayo Clinic and also conducted specialized medical research under Professors Carl J. Wiggers at Western Reserve University and Anton Julius Carlson at the University of Chicago. Strughold returned to Germany in late-1929 and resumed teaching at the Würzburg Physiological Institute, eventually becoming a full professor in March 1933.

=== Work for Nazi Germany ===
In 1935 Strughold joined the faculty of the Institute of Physiology at the Friedrich-Wilhelm University of Berlin. Through his association with Robert Ritter von Greim (then Adolf Hitler's personal pilot), Strughold became acquainted socially with Reichsmarschall Hermann Göring and other high-ranking members of the Nazi regime, though he never formally joined the Nazi Party. In April 1935, he was appointed Director of the Berlin-based "Research Institute for Aviation Medicine", a medical science think tank that operated under the auspices of Göring's Reich Ministry of Aviation. Under Strughold's leadership, the Institute grew to become Germany's foremost aeromedical research establishment, pioneering the study of the physical effects of high-altitude and supersonic speed flight, along with establishing the altitude chamber concept of "time of useful consciousness". Beginning in 1936 Strughold also served as co-editor of the medical journal Luftfahrtmedizin (Aviation Medicine).

Though he was a civilian researcher, the majority of the studies and projects Strughold's institute undertook during this time were commissioned and financed by the German armed forces (principally the Luftwaffe) as part of the Nazi's ongoing policy of re-armament preceding World War II. With the outbreak of war in 1939, the organization was absorbed into the German military and incorporated into the Medical Service of the Luftwaffe where it was rechristened as the "Air Force Institute for Aviation Medicine" and placed under the command of Surgeon-General (Generaloberstabsarzt) Erich Hippke. Strughold was also commissioned as an officer in the German Air Force, eventually rising to the rank of Colonel (Oberst). He was also elected as a member of the German National Academy of Sciences Leopoldina in 1941.

==== Human experimentation ====
In February 1942, Schutzstaffel (SS) physician Hauptsturmführer Sigmund Rascher collaborated with Luftwaffe aviation scientists Hermann Becker-Freyseng, Siegfried Ruff and Hans-Wolfgang Romberg to plan and carry out a number of aeromedical experiments in which inmates from the Dachau concentration camp served as human test subjects. The study took place in the spring and summer of 1942 and initially focused on high-altitude experiments. Camp inmates, mostly Polish and Soviet POWs, were locked inside of a portable pressure chamber built by the Luftwaffe in which the interior air pressure could be altered to simulate the effects of freefalling from a high-altitude without oxygen. Of the 200 test subjects employed in the experiment 80 were killed by the tests outright, with the remainder subsequently being executed by the SS.

From August 1942–May 1943, Rascher and the Luftwaffe physicians also conducted so-called "freezing experiments" using 300 live test subjects. The purpose of these tests was to determine the best way to warm German pilots who had been downed at sea and were suffering from hypothermia. Prisoners were made to remain outdoors naked in freezing temperatures or submerged in tanks of freezing water for hours to simulate the effects of hypothermia before being immersed in hot, sometimes boiling, water to facilitate the warming process, often with fatal results. In October 1942 Rascher delivered a presentation to a medical conference in Nuremberg in which he detailed the findings of his freezing experiments at Dachau to the attendees, Hubertus Strughold and Luftwaffe Surgeon-General Erich Hippke among them.

In early-1944 Strughold was named Aviation Medical Consultant to the newly-appointed Chief of the Luftwaffe Medical Service, Generaloberst Oskar Schröder. In July 1944, Schröder initiated a new series of human experiments at Dachau. This study, overseen by Dr. Hans Eppinger and Luftwaffe aviation scientists Wilhelm Beiglboeck and Konrad Schäfer, centered on testing new methods of seawater desalination. In the course of the experiment, 90 Romani inmates from Dachau were deprived of food and forced to consume large amounts of salt water or to have it injected directly into their veins. Half the subjects were then administered a medication called Berkatit and all were then made to undergo an invasive liver biopsy without anesthetic, with numerous subjects dying as a result. The extent to which the Dachau experiments may have occurred with either the knowledge or approval of Strughold in his role as Director of the Institute for Aviation Medicine, remains a source of controversy.

Following the German defeat in May 1945, Strughold was placed under house arrest by the British Army in Göttingen. Strughold would subsequently claim to Allied authorities that, despite his influential position within the Luftwaffe Medical Service and his attendance at the October 1942 medical conference in Nuremberg, he had no knowledge of the atrocities that were being committed at Dachau by men who were ostensibly his subordinates. Strughold was never subsequently charged with any wrongdoing by the Allies. However, a 1946 memorandum produced by the staff of the Nuremberg Trials listed Strughold as one of thirteen "persons, firms or individuals implicated" in the war crimes committed at Dachau. In addition, several Luftwaffe officials associated with Strughold's Institute for Aviation Medicine, including his former research assistant Dr. Hermann Becker-Freyseng and his ex-commanding officer Oskar Schröder, were convicted of crimes against humanity in connection with the Dachau experiments at the 1946–1947 Nuremberg Doctor's Trial. During these proceedings, Strughold contributed several affidavits for the defense on behalf of his accused colleagues.

=== Work for the United States ===
In October 1945 Strughold returned to academia, becoming director of the Physiological Institute at Heidelberg University. He also began working on behalf of the US Army Air Force, becoming Chief Scientist of its Aeromedical Center, which was located on the campus of the former Kaiser Wilhelm Institute for Medical Research. In this capacity Strughold edited German Aviation Medicine in World War II, a book-length summary of the knowledge gained by German aviation researchers during the war. In August 1947 Strughold was brought to the United States, along with many other highly valuable German scientists, as part of Operation Paperclip.

Along with another former Luftwaffe physician, Richard Lindenberg, Strughold was assigned to the US Air Force base at Randolph Field near San Antonio, Texas. It was while at Randolph Field that Strughold began conducting some of the first research into the potential medical challenges posed by space travel, in conjunction with fellow "Paperclip Scientist" Dr. Heinz Haber. Strughold coined the terms "space medicine" and "astrobiology" to describe this area of study in 1948. The following year he was appointed as the first and only Professor of Space Medicine at the US Air Force's newly established School of Aviation Medicine (SAM) by the institution's commandant, Colonel Harry G. Armstrong. SAM would become one of the first medical establishments dedicated to conducting research on "astrobiology" and the so-called "human factors" associated with crewed spaceflight. Strughold also first described "Mars jars", containers that simulate the atmosphere of Mars, that have now become an essential tool in astrobiological research.

Under Strughold, the School of Aviation Medicine conducted pioneering studies on issues such as atmospheric control, the physical effects of weightlessness and the disruption of normal time cycles. In 1951 Strughold revolutionized existing notions concerning spaceflight when he co-authored the influential research paper Where Does Space Begin? in which he proposed that space was present in small gradations that grew as altitude levels increased, rather than existing in remote regions of the atmosphere. Between 1952 and 1954 he would oversee the building of the space cabin simulator, a sealed chamber in which human test subjects were placed for extended periods of time in order to view the potential physical, biological and psychological effects of extra-atmospheric flight.

Strughold obtained US citizenship in July 1956 and the following year was named Adviser for Research to the newly-established Aerospace Medical Center at Brooks Air Force Base and would later take over as Chairman of the Center's Advanced Studies Group in 1960. He was next appointed Chief Scientist of the Aerospace Medical Division (AMD) of US Air Force Systems Command in February 1962. In this capacity, Strughold worked closely with the National Aeronautics and Space Administration (NASA) where he was responsible for supervising all aerospace medicine research being conducted by the US Air Force in support of the national space program. During his collaboration with NASA, Strughold played a central role in designing the pressure suit and onboard life support systems used by both the Gemini and Apollo astronauts. He also directed the training of the flight surgeons and medical staff of the Apollo program in advance of the planned mission to the Moon. Strughold retired from his position with the US Air Force in 1968 but continued to serve as an honorary consultant to the AMD.

== Later life and controversy ==
In March 1971, Strughold married Mary Webb Delahite (née Mary Cecilia Houston Webb), who was 16 years his junior and whom he had met in 1959 at a mutual friend's birthday party. Mary had three adult daughters from her first marriage. In 1983 he was awarded the Federal Order of Merit by the government of West Germany and the Texas State Senate declared June 15 "Hubertus Strughold Day" in his honor in 1985. Strughold died at his ranch outside of San Antonio on September 25, 1986, at the age of 88.

During his work on behalf of the US Air Force and NASA, Strughold was the subject of three separate US government investigations into his suspected involvement in war crimes committed under the Nazis. A 1958 investigation by the Justice Department turned up no derogatory information and fully exonerated Strughold, while a second inquiry launched by the Immigration and Naturalization Service in 1974 was later abandoned citing a lack of evidence. In 1983 the Office of Special Investigations reopened his case but withdrew from the effort following Strughold's death.

After his death, Strughold's alleged connection to the Dachau experiments became more widely known following the release of US Army Intelligence documents from 1945 that listed him among those being sought as war criminals by US authorities. These revelations did significant damage to Strughold's reputation and resulted in the revocation of various honors that had been bestowed upon him over the course of his career. In 1993, at the request of the World Jewish Congress, his portrait was removed from a mural of prominent physicians displayed at Ohio State University. Following similar protests by the Anti-Defamation League (ADL), the Air Force decided in 1995 to rename the Hubertus Strughold Aeromedical Library at Brooks Air Force Base, which had been named in Strughold's honor in 1977. His portrait, however, still hangs there. Further action by the ADL also led to Strughold's removal from the International Space Hall of Fame in Alamogordo, New Mexico in May 2006.

=== Later revelations ===
Further questions about Strughold's activities during World War II emerged in 2004 following an investigation conducted by the Historical Committee of the German Society of Air and Space Medicine. The inquiry uncovered evidence of oxygen deprivation experiments carried out by Strughold's Institute for Aviation Medicine in 1943. According to these findings six epileptic children, between the ages of 11 and 13, were taken from the Nazis' Brandenburg Euthanasia Centre to Strughold's Berlin laboratory where they were placed in vacuum chambers to induce epileptic seizures in an effort to simulate the effects of high-altitude sicknesses, such as hypoxia.

While, unlike the Dachau experiments, all the test subjects survived the research process, this revelation led the Society of Air and Space Medicine to abolish a major award bearing Strughold's name. A similar campaign by American scholars prompted the US branch of the Aerospace Medical Association to announce in 2013 that it would retire a similar award, also named in Strughold's honor, which it had been bestowing since 1963. The move was met with opposition from defenders of Strughold, citing his many notable contributions to the American space program and the lack of any formal proof of his direct involvement in war crimes.

== Awards and honors ==
Known as The Father of Space Medicine

- Theodore C. Lyster Award, Aerospace Medical Association, 1958
- Louis H. Bauer Founders Award, Aerospace Medical Association, 1965

=== Hubertus Strughold Award ===
The Hubertus Strughold Award was established by the Space Medicine Branch, known today as the Space Medicine Association, a member organization of the Aerospace Medical Association. In 1962 the Award was established in honor of Dr. Hubertus Strughold, also known as "The Father of Space Medicine". The award was presented every year from 1963 through 2012 to a Space Medicine Branch member for outstanding contributions in applications and research in the field of space-related medical research.

==== Awardees ====
===== 1960s =====
- 1963 Cpt. Ashton Graybiel, Cpt. M.D., USN
- 1964 Maj. Gen. Otis O. Benson, Jr., USAF, M.C.
- 1965 Hans-Georg Clamann, M.D.
- 1966 Hermann J. Schaefer, Ph.D.
- 1967 Charles Alden Berry, M.D.
- 1968 David G. Simons, M.D.
- 1969 Col. Stanley C. White, M.D., USAF, M.C.

===== 1970s =====
- 1970 RearAdm Frank Burkhart Voris, MC, USN
- 1971 Dr. Donald Davis Flickinger, M.D.
- 1972 Col. Paul A. Campbell, USAF (Ret.)
- 1973 Andres Ingver Karstens, M.D.
- 1974 Cdr. Joseph P. Kerwin, MC, USN
- 1975 Lawrence F. Dietlein, M.D.
- 1976 Harald J. von Beckh
- 1977 William Kennedy Douglas
- 1978 Walton L. Jones, Jr., M.D.
- 1979 Col. John E. Pickering, USAF (Ret.)

===== 1980s =====
- 1980 Rufus R. Hessberg, M.D.
- 1981 Maj. Gen. Heinz S. Fuchs, GAF, MC (Ret.)
- 1982 Sidney D. Leverett, Jr., Ph.D.
- 1983 Sherman Vonograd P., M.D.
- 1984 Arnauld E. Nicogossian, M.D.
- 1985 Philip C. Johnson, Jr., M.D.
- 1986 Carolyn Leach Huntoon, Ph.D.
- 1987 Karl E. Klein, M.D.
- 1988 Anatoly Ivanovich Grigoriev, M.D.
- 1989 Brig. Gen. Eduard C. Burchard, GAF, MC

===== 1990s =====
- 1990 Joan Vernikos-Danellis, M.D.
- 1991 Stanley R. Mohler, M.D.
- 1992 Roberta Lynn Bondar, M.D.
- 1993 George Wyckliffe Hoffler, M.D.
- 1994 Emmett B. Ferguson, M.D.
- 1995 Mary Anne Bassett Frey, Ph.D.
- 1996 Norman E. Thagard, M.D.
- 1997 Shannon Matilda Wells Lucid, Ph.D.
- 1998 Valeri V. Polyakov, M.D.
- 1999 Sam Lee Pool, M.D.

===== 2000s =====
- 2000 Franklin Story Musgrave, M.D.
- 2001 John B. Charles, Ph.D.
- 2002 Earl Howard Wood, M.D., Ph.D.
- 2003 Jonathan Clark (for STS 107 crew)
- 2004 No award
- 2005 William S. Augerson, M.D.
- 2006 Jeffrey R. Davis, M.D.
- 2007 Clarence A. Jernigan, M.D.
- 2008 Richard Jennings, M.D.
- 2009 Jim Vanderploeg, M.D.

===== 2010s =====
- 2010 Irene Duhart Long, M.D.
- 2011 Michael Barratt, M.D.
- 2012 Smith L. Johnston III, M.D.
- 2013 Award retired by the Space Medicine Association

== See also ==
- Aerospace Medical Association
- Human factors and ergonomics
- Nazi human experimentation
- Operation Paperclip
- Sigmund Rascher

== Bibliography ==
- Musgrave, S (2000). "Hubertus Strughold Award". Aviation, Space, and Environmental Medicine. Vol. 71, no. 8 (published August 2000). p. 874. PMID 10954370.
- "Hubertus Strughold Award. Earl H. Wood, M.D., Ph.D". Aviation, Space, and Environmental Medicine. Vol. 73, no. 9 (published September 2002). 2002. pp. 948–9. PMID 12234052.
