= Ludwig Stumpfegger =

SS physician (1910–1945)

- Stumpfegger as an SS-Obersturmführer
- Born: 11 July 1910; Munich, Bavaria, German Empire
- Died: 2 May 1945 (aged 34); Lehrter Bahnhof, Berlin, Germany
- Alma mater: Ludwig-Maximilians-Universität München
- Military career
- Allegiance: Nazi Germany
- Branch: Schutzstaffel
- Service years: 1933–1945
- Rank: SS-Obersturmbannführer
- Conflicts: World War II

Ludwig Stumpfegger (11 July 1910 – c. 2 May 1945) was a German doctor who served in the Schutzstaffel (SS) of Nazi Germany during World War II. He was Adolf Hitler's personal surgeon from 1944 to 1945, and was present in the Führerbunker in Berlin in late April 1945.

== Early life and career ==
Ludwig Stumpfegger was born in Munich in Bavaria. He started his medical studies at the Ludwig-Maximilians-Universität München in 1930, following secondary school completion. He earned his medical degree on 11 August 1937.

Stumpfegger joined the Schutzstaffel (SS) on 2 June 1933 and the Nazi Party on 1 May 1935. He initially worked as an assistant doctor under Professor Karl Gebhardt in the Hohenlychen Sanatorium, which specialised in sports accidents. As a result of this experience, he was part of the medical team, along with Gebhardt, at the 1936 Summer Olympics in Berlin and the Winter Olympics of the same year in Garmisch-Partenkirchen.

== World War II ==
After World War II began, the Hohenlychen Sanatorium was used by the SS. Under the supervision of Gebhardt, Fritz Fischer and Herta Oberheuser, Stumpfegger participated in medical experiments on women from the Ravensbrück concentration camp. In November 1939, he transferred to the surgical department of the SS hospital in Berlin. He was transferred back to the Hohenlychen Sanatorium as adjutant to Gebhardt in March 1940. In April 1943, he was promoted to SS-Obersturmbannführer. On Himmler's recommendation, he was transferred to Wolfsschanze Führer headquarters as the resident doctor in October 1944.

== Berlin 1945 and death ==
In 1945, Stumpfegger started working directly for Hitler in the Führerbunker in Berlin. By 29 April 1945, Stumpfegger had distributed brass-cased cyanide capsules to any military adjutants, secretaries, and staff in the bunker who wished to kill themselves rather than be captured. Some sources report that, as the Red Army advanced towards the bunker complex, Stumpfegger helped Magda Goebbels kill her children as they slept, before she and her husband Joseph Goebbels committed suicide on 1 May.

On 30 April 1945, just before committing suicide, Hitler signed an order allowing bunker personnel to attempt to escape the approaching enemy forces. On 1 May, Stumpfegger left the bunker with a group that included Martin Bormann, Werner Naumann and Hitler Youth leader Artur Axmann. At the Weidendammer Bridge, a Tiger tank spearheaded the first attempt by the Germans to cross the bridge, but the tank was hit and Bormann and Stumpfegger were "knocked over". On the third attempt, made around 01:00, the group was able to cross the Spree. Bormann, Stumpfegger, and Axmann walked along railroad tracks to Lehrter station, where Axmann decided to go alone in the opposite direction of the other two men, but he encountered a Red Army patrol and doubled back. Axmann saw two bodies, which he later identified as Bormann and Stumpfegger, on a bridge near the railway switching yard, the moonlight clearly illuminating their faces. He did not have time to determine what had killed them.

== Discovery of remains ==
In 1963, a retired postal worker named Albert Krumnow told police that around 8 May 1945, the Soviets had ordered him and his colleagues to bury two bodies found near the railway bridge near Lehrter station. One was dressed in a Wehrmacht uniform and the other only in his underwear. Krumnow's colleague Wagenpfohl found an SS doctor's paybook on the second body, identifying him as Ludwig Stumpfegger. He gave the paybook to his boss, who turned it over to the Soviets. They in turn destroyed it. He wrote to Stumpfegger's wife on 14 August 1945 and told her that her husband's body was "interred with the bodies of several other dead soldiers in the grounds of the Alpendorf in Berlin NW 40, Invalidenstrasse 63."

Excavations in 1965 at the site specified by Axmann and Krumnow failed to locate the bodies, but in 1972 construction uncovered human remains about 12 metres (39 feet) away from the prior excavation. Fragments of glass found in the jawbones of both skeletons suggested that they had bitten cyanide capsules to avoid capture. The size of one skeleton, and the shape of the skull, matched Bormann, as did dental records reconstructed from memory in 1945 by Hugo Blaschke. The second skeleton was of similar height to Stumpfegger. Composite photographs, where images of the skulls were overlaid on photographs of the two men's faces, were completely congruent. Facial reconstruction was undertaken in early 1973 on both skulls to confirm the skeletal remains found in 1972 were Stumpfegger and Bormann. Bormann's identity was further confirmed by DNA testing in 1999.

== Portrayals ==
- Thorsten Krohn played him in the 2004 German film Downfall.
