= Gscheid Pass =

Gscheid Pass (where Gscheid is a regional Austrian-German word derived from scheiden/gescheiden meaning "divide") may refer to the following mountain passes:

- Kernhofer Gscheid Pass
- Preiner Gscheid Pass

== See also ==
- Gschaid (disambiguation)
- Gschaidt
