= Hermann Becker-Freyseng =

German physician (1910–1961)

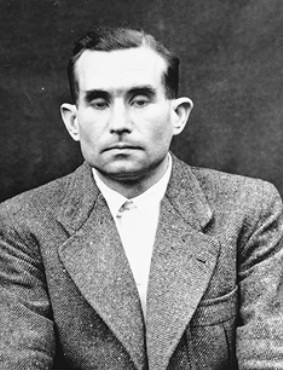
- Mug shot of Becker-Freyseng
- Born: 18 July 1910; Ludwigshafen, German Empire
- Died: 27 August 1961 (aged 51); Heidelberg, West Germany
- Occupation: Physician
- Organization: Luftwaffe
- Political party: Nazi Party
- Convictions: War crimes Crimes against humanity
- Trial: Doctors' Trial
- Penalty: 20 years imprisonment; commuted to 10 years imprisonment

Hermann Becker-Freyseng (18 July 1910 – 27 August 1961) was a German physician, consultant for aviation medicine with the Luftwaffe and a convicted Nazi war criminal, who oversaw human experimentation on concentration camp prisoners. Becker-Freyseng was tried and convicted of war crimes and crimes against humanity at the Doctors' Trial in 1947; he was sentenced to 20 years imprisonment, but his sentence was commuted to 10 years and he was released in 1952.

== Early research ==
Becker-Freyseng graduated as a physician from the University of Berlin in 1935, although his first notable research involvement did not come along until three years later when he worked with Hans-Georg Clamman on experiments on the effects of pure oxygen.

== War crimes ==
Becker-Freyseng was initially recruited by Hubertus Strughold to take part in the Nazi human experimentation programme that he oversaw. Becker-Freyseng's particular area of experimentation was low-pressure-chamber research, in which he worked alongside Ulrich Luft, Otto Gauer, and Erich Opitz. The Department for Aviation Medicine was established in 1936 with Becker-Freyseng initially just attached before he was promoted to co-ordinator. Unlike some of his colleagues in military medical research, he was a member of the Nazi Party. He also held the rank of captain in the Medical Service.

The various experiments undertaken either by Becker-Freyseng or under his supervision during his work resulted in several fatalities. In particular, the high altitude experiments performed on inmates of Dachau concentration camp by Becker-Freyseng, Siegfried Ruff and Hans-Wolfgang Romberg claimed several lives. One of the most well-known was that detailed in a paper published by him and Konrad Schäfer entitled "Thirst and Thirst Quenching in Emergency Situations at Sea". For the experiments, the academics had personally asked Heinrich Himmler for 40 healthy camp inmates who were then forced to drink salt water or, in some cases, had it injected into their veins. Half the subjects were then given a drug called berkatit, whilst all were subjected to an invasive liver biopsy without anaesthetic. All subjects died, including those given the berkatit, which proved toxic.

== Trial and work with the USA ==
Indicted at the Doctors' Trial, he was found guilty of charges 2 and 3 (war crimes and crimes against humanity). He was sentenced to twenty years' imprisonment. However, in 1946, Becker-Freyseng's name was amongst a list of twenty drawn up by Harry George Armstrong who were to be brought to the United States to assist in the development of American space medicine. Along with Kurt Blome, Siegfried Ruff and Konrad Schäfer, he was taken to the US and put to work on projects related to the space race. Given responsibility for collecting and publishing the research undertaken by him and his colleagues, the resulting book, German Aviation Medicine: World War II, appeared just after Becker-Freyseng began his prison sentence. In 1951, Becker-Freyseng's sentence was commuted to 10 years, and he was released from prison in 1952.

Becker-Freyseng was diagnosed with multiple sclerosis in 1960 and died from the condition the following year.
