= Gschaid =

Gschaid may refer to:

- Gschaid bei Birkfeld, a municipality in the district of Weiz in Styria, Austria.
- Gschaid bei Weiz, a cadastral community of Naas, Austria
- Gschaid, a locality in Altlengbach, Austria

== See also ==
- Gscheid Pass (disambiguation)
- Gschaidt
