= Richard Latterell =

American environmental activist (1928–2024)

Richard Lewis Latterell (March 14, 1928 – October 16, 2024) was an American environmental activist and biology professor at Shepherd University from 1968 to 1992. He founded the Jefferson County Watersheds Coalition, led an annual cleanup of the Potomac River near Shepherdstown, West Virginia, and has conducted spring and fall counts of macroinvertebrate species in streams in Jefferson County, West Virginia. The presence and diversity of species have shown poor water quality in most streams, because of sediment from construction sites and inadequately treated sewer plant effluent.

== Legal action ==
Latterell was one of the plaintiffs in the landmark 2003 case Ohio Valley Environmental Coalition v. Environmental Protection Agency on rules concerning degradation of West Virginia waters. The case won stricter rules protecting water quality.

Latterell was also one of the plaintiffs in the first successful case stopping a subdivision at the Jefferson County Board of Zoning Appeals, the Thorn Hill case in 2000. Later he and others appealed other variations of the Thorn Hill subdivision, and his initial win in West Virginia Circuit Court was ultimately overturned by later decisions in Circuit Court. From 2004 to 2007 he and other citizens were the targets of a SLAPP suit by the Thorn Hill developers for two million dollars in damages based on their opposition to Thorn Hill. The judge decided for the citizens and against the developers.

Latterell also participated in cases on pollution at the West Virginia Public Service Commission and Environmental Quality Board.

He and his wife, Frances Meehan Latterell, took soil samples at a former apple orchard proposed for the Huntfield subdivision, and found high levels of lead and arsenic, from the lead arsenate formerly used as an insecticide. The developer, who had not reported test results for lead and arsenic, committed to stripping the polluted soil and encapsulating it in berms.

== Other activities ==
Latterell is a scientist in plant genetics. He completed his PhD study on the plant genus nicotina in 1958 at Cornell University. Latterell also studied the interaction of bees and red clover plant species utilization, while at the University of Pennsylvania. Later in his career, he was a pioneer exobiologist on the Mars Simulator II (MSII), which simulated the day/night cycle and the nitrogen and carbon dioxide environment of Mars. Over 250 different seed types were tested for germination in the Mars Simulator II model, where over 50 plant species germinated without oxygen, including corn and rye. Studies found that an African succulent plant (cereus cactus) and a Peruvian cactus variety survived the longest in these Martian atmospheres. While working under NASA contracts in the 1960s for Union Carbide Laboratory in Tarrytown, New York, Latterell published studies in a variety of academic journals on seed germinations from these simulated Martian environments (MSII).

- Nitrogen- and helium-induced anoxia – different lethal effects on rye seeds, Science v.153 (July 1) p. 69-70 (1966)
- Behavior of plants under extraterrestrial conditions – seed germination in atmospheres containing nitrogen oxides, Proceedings of the National Academy of Sciences, v.52 (July) p. 11-13 (1964
- Changes in Sensitivity of Maize chromosomes to X Rays during Seed Germination, American Journal of Botany, v49, n5 (May-Jun., 1962): 472-478
- The oxygen effect and its relation to changes in radiosensitivity during seed germination, Mutation Research v.4 (2) p. 191-200 (1967)
- Nitrogen- and helium-induced anoxia – different lethal effects on rye seeds, v.153 (July 1) p. 69-70 (1966)
- S.M. Siegel & Latterell, Richard. Elements of SPACE BIOLOGY – An experimental approach to the basic biology of Stress. Contract NASA CR-75437
- LATTERELL, R. Lo, and SIEGEL, S, M. Differential losses of seed viability condition by chemically inert gases. Am. J. Bot. NASA #N67-25642 52(6, Pt. 2) ~622-623. (Abstr.) July 1965.
- From 2000 to 2005, the Latterells helped write Vision 2020, a plan for Shepherdstown, West Virginia, and its area.
- In 2005 the Latterells put their farm under a perpetual conservation easement with the Jefferson County Farmland Protection Board and the Land Trust of the Eastern Panhandle.

== Death ==
Latterell died on October 16, 2024 at the age of 96.

== Sources ==
- Description of farm and easement
- Court opinion in OVEC v. EPA * Annotated copy of the same opinion
- Court opinion in Thornhill v. Latterell
- WV Public Service Commission decision
