= Genzken =

Genzken is a surname. Notable people with the surname include:

- Isa Genzken (born 1948), German artist
- Karl Genzken (1885–1957), Nazi German physician who committed medical atrocities
