= Karl Höllenreiner =

Survivor of the Nazis

- Karl Höllenreiner, right, with his uncle and sister in Munich, c. 1930.
- Born: 9 March 1914
- Died: 1 September 1984
- Known for: Nazi Doctors' Trial
- Relatives: Rosa Höllenreiner, Herman Manno Höllenreiner, Hugo Höllenreiner, and 1 child killed at Dachau Concentration Camp

Karl Höllenreiner (9 March 1914 – 1 September 1984) was a survivor of the Nazi genocide of the Sinti and Roma. He testified as a witness and victim of the seawater experiments at the Nuremberg Doctors' Trial.

== Life ==
Höllenreiner, a citizen living in Munich in the 1930s and of Sinti origin, was arrested on 29 May 1944 and deported to the Auschwitz Gypsy camp. The camp was operational until August 1944. Höllenreiner was tattooed and registered there with the prisoner number Z 10062.

From there he was deported to Buchenwald concentration camp. In mid-July 1944, he was transferred to Dachau concentration camp, where he became an involuntary subject in Wilhelm Beiglböck's seawater experiments. Subsequently, he was deployed as a forced laborer in a subcamp of the Messerschmitt GmbH factory.

Höllenreiner lost his child, and his sister Rosa and her two children, at Dachau. Others of Karl's family suffered under the Nazis, including Herman Mano Höllenreiner, and Hugo Höllenreiner.

After the war, Karl worked as a textile and musical instrument dealer. During his testimony at the Doctors' Trial on June 17, 1947, he was told by lawyers under cross-examination "not to be evasive in the way Gypsies usually are," and ultimately slapped the defendant in the trial; he was sentenced to 90 days in prison for this and released on probation shortly afterward.

Höllenreiner gave the following account at trial:

"The following week, the actual experiments began. We received no food at all and were only allowed to drink seawater or chemically treated seawater. As I recall, our group of 40 Roma was divided into three roughly equal subgroups. Group 1 received only real seawater. Group 2 received only chemically treated seawater, which was a dark yellow color and certainly much worse than pure seawater. Group 3 received only treated seawater, which looked roughly like real drinking water. I belonged to Group 2. [...] During these experiments, I suffered terrible bouts of thirst, felt very ill, lost a lot of weight, and finally developed a fever and felt so weak that I could no longer stand. [...]"

"I still vividly remember a scene where a Czechoslovakian Gypsy begged the Air Force doctor that he couldn't possibly drink any more water. On the Air Force doctor's orders, this Czechoslovakian Gypsy was then tied to a bed, and the doctor himself forcibly pumped seawater down his throat using a stomach pump. During the experiments, most of the Gypsies underwent liver and spinal taps. I myself had a liver tap and know from personal experience that these taps were terribly painful. Even today, when the weather changes, I feel intense pain where the liver tap was performed. All the liver and spinal taps were performed by the Air Force doctor himself... [...] Of the original 40 men, one, as already mentioned, only participated in the experiments for a few days. Three were so close to death that they were carried out that same evening on stretchers, covered with white sheets. I never heard from these three again."

== See also ==
- Romani people
- Nazi human experimentation
