= Hohenlychen Sanatorium =

Former hospital in Germany

Coordinates: 53.2014°N 13.3261°E

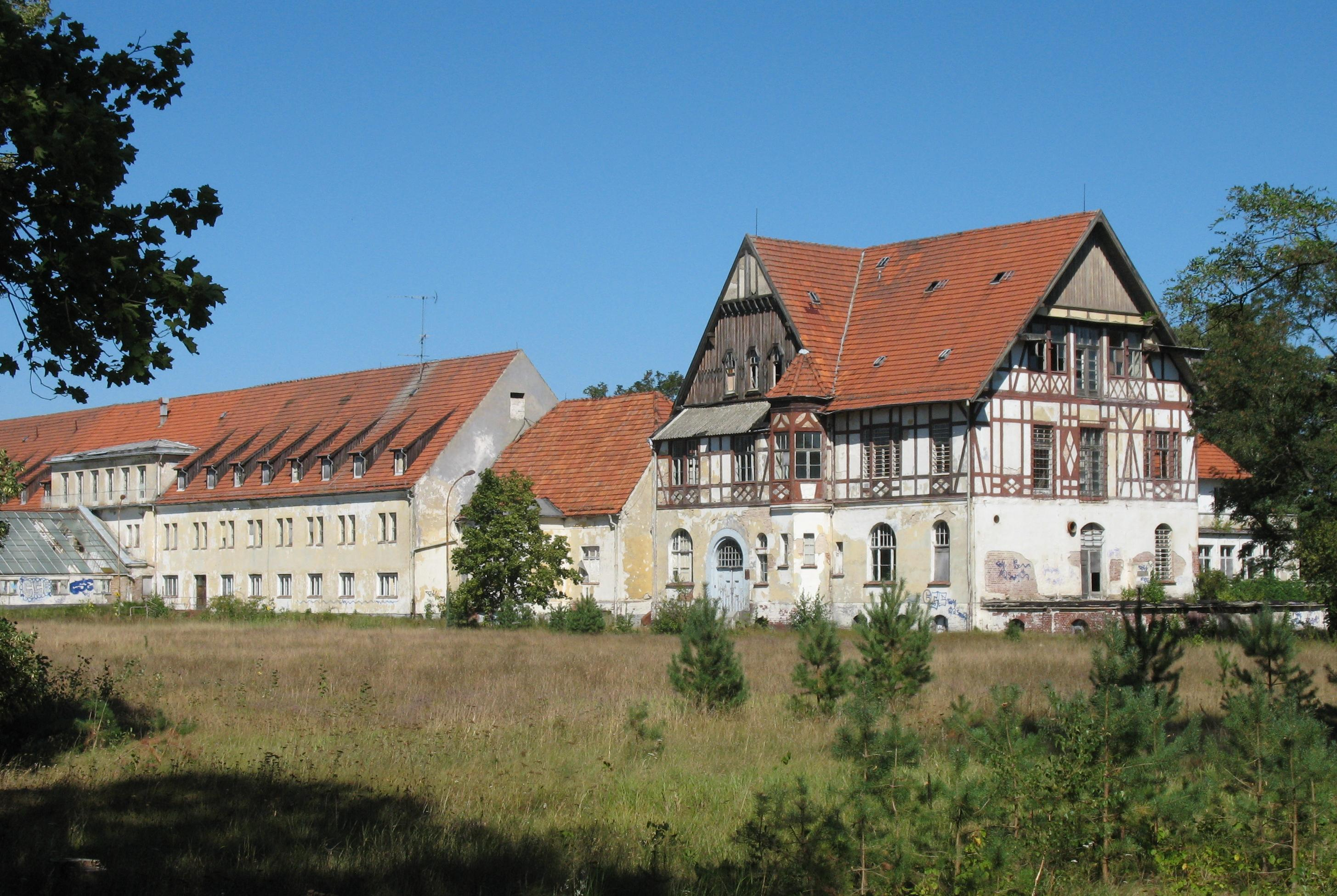
Hohenlychen Sanatorium

The Hohenlychen Sanatorium was a complex of sanatoriums in Lychen, Uckermark district, 108 km north of Berlin, Germany, that was in use from 1902 to 1945. The complex was originally built in 1902 to house tubercular children. By the 1930s the Hohenlychen Sanatorium had become one of the main medical facilities of the Schutzstaffel (SS), where injured or convalescing SS-men were treated.

== Beginnings ==
The treatment of tuberculosis developed in the second half of the 19th century, which required plenty of sunlight, clean air, a balanced diet, and sufficient exercise, initially led to the establishment of private sanatoriums for wealthy patients. However, many working-class people were also affected by the disease. Following the passing of the first social welfare legislation, the state insurance institutions that were established in the 1890s saw it as their responsibility to build many sanatoriums. Between 1898 and 1904, there was a veritable building boom - in Prussia alone, forty-nine new sanatoriums were built, and existing ones were expanded

In 1902, Gotthold Pannwitz, the founder of the Central Committee for the Establishment of Sanatoriums for Lung Diseases, acquired around one hectare of land from the town of Lychen for the People's Sanatorium Association of the German Red Cross. The sanatorium was initially run on a trial basis for three months in the summer. Two barracks were erected to accommodate sixteen girls and sixteen boys. There was also a service barrack. Meals were served in 1902 in the nearby "Schützenhaus" restaurant, and from the summer of 1903 there was already a separate dining hall with a kitchen on the premises.

After some initial resistance, the town agreed to the expansion of the site by a further two hectares and the first permanent buildings were erected in 1903 to accommodate sixty children. In October, the girls' home for twenty patients was opened. The architectural designs were created by the architects Paul Hakenholz and Paul Brandes. The grounds of the institution ultimately covered an area of almost sixteen hectares.

In 1904, Heinrich Venn donated St. Helen's Chapel. In 1905, another association joined the project, and by 1907 it had erected the "Cecilienheim", which was designed for ninety children and was the first clinic in Prussia to offer surgical and orthopaedic treatment for children. In 1907, a third dormitory building with an integrated bathing facility was added for children with pulmonary tuberculosis.

The facility was steadily expanded. By the mid-1920s, forty-seven buildings had been erected at the Hohenlychen site. The sanatorium consisted of fifteen specialist medical departments, the most important of which were the "Viktoria Luise Children's Sanatorium" for children suffering from tuberculosis and the "Empress Auguste Viktoria Sanatorium" for women suffering from tuberculosis. There was also the "Waldfrieden" recreation home for children suffering from tuberculosis, the "Werner Hospital" for surgical operations, the holiday settlement at the Zenssee for children suffering from tuberculosis and the "Queen Luise Memorial Country Settlement". A small farm and the state-approved nurses' school "Augusta Helpers' School" belonged to the institution. The sanatorium association also ran its own spa hotel near Lychen railway station from January 1910.

During the First World War, the sanatorium was used as a military hospital. After 1918, the generous support provided before the war failed to resume. The onset of inflation made the financial situation even more difficult. The rural settlement and the further education schools had to close. Between 1924 and 1927, there was a brief upswing, as renovation work was carried out with funds from several ministries and the Red Cross in preparation for the 25th anniversary. During this time, Hohenlychen gained worldwide importance, especially in terms of its success in the orthopaedic and surgical treatment of bone and joint tuberculosis. In 1927, the League of Nations' hygiene commission met at the sanatorium. Two years later, however, the "Waldfrieden" children's convalescent home also had to close for financial reasons.

== During the Nazi Era ==
After the Nazi takeover Karl Gebhardt got in touch with his friend, Heinrich Himmler, with whom he had been at school in Landshut. He started the process of joining the Schutzstaffel (SS), and was assigned to Hans von Tschammer und Osten, who put him in contact with Leonardo Conti. Conti appointed him to be Medical Superintendent at Hohenlychen, on the basis that the sanatorium should be turned into a centre for sport and rehabilitation medicine, and act as a military hospital for the SS. Despite its excellent results in treating tuberculosis in children, the Jewish medical director who had held the post for nineteen years was dismissed, and Gebhardt was able to realise his plans. The focus was now on sports and occupational injuries as well as reconstructive surgery. Surgical and inpatient departments for the special treatment of adults with joint disorders and lung diseases were established.

The establishment also became a Reich sports sanatorium. Funding from German Sport Aid enabled investments to be made to expand and modernize the facility. The clinical department for sports and occupational injuries was extremely popular. The former national coach Otto Nerz claimed that a hypothetical "Hohenlychen national team" could compete against almost any soccer team, as many national players and top athletes were treated and recovered in Lychen. Hohenlychen was considered a "fashionable place to stay" not only for patients undergoing treatment, but also for officials of the Nazi Party. Heinrich Himmler, Albert Speer and Rudolf Hess were frequent guests. The visitors' books list numerous Nazi celebrities who visited the sanatoriums. In addition to Hitler himself, these included the Leaders of the Reich, Reich sports leaders, state secretaries, army staff doctors and international delegations from Italy, Britain, France, Portugal, Chile, Peru and Argentina. The mayor of Tokyo spent his vacation in Hohenlychen, as did the Greek crown prince and princess. In addition to curing and recuperating patients and officials, lectures were also held, especially for medical elites. The establishment now had over 500 beds.

A gymnasium could also be used for cinema screenings and company parties. In addition to the bathing facilities at the lakes, a large swimming pool, which also served as a treatment pool for water massages, was built. The glass roof could be opened on warm sunny days. In addition to further sports grounds, a further pharmacy was built and a weather station, which was to be used for research into the relationship between the weather and the course of illnesses was installed. The town of Lychen benefited from the sanatoriums, especially through tourism. Between 1933 and 1942, over 25,000 patients were treated. Many residents were given work in the sanatoriums. A second railway station was built to provide better infrastructure and a faster connection to Berlin. Hitler's second personal physician Ludwig Stumpfegger worked under Karl Gebhardt, as did Fritz Fischer, Herta Oberheuser and Kurt Heißmeyer.

On the outbreak of war, the sanatorium became a military hospital for the SS. In 1942 Karl Gebhardt’s reputation suffered a blow. Reinhardt Heydrich, Himmler’s right-hand man had suffered an assassination attempt on May 27. Gebhardt did not value sulphonamide (an antibiotic) and Heydrich was only given a low dose, which was not sufficient to prevent his death. Ernst-Robert Grawitz, head of the German Red Cross had previously suggested to Gebhardt that he should carry out experiments on concentration camp inmates, but he had been reluctant to do so. Now he was motivated by the need to justify his actions. After gaining Himmler’s agreement, the experiments started at Ravensbrück Women’s Concentration Camp nearby. Gebhardt, first reported on the clinical trials on August 29, 1942. The test groups consisted of thirty-six women who had bacteria, some with wood and glass particles, inserted into their thighs. Three of the test subjects died and it was concluded that the sulphonamides were not effective in preventing wound infections. Parallel to the sulphonamide experiments, Ludwig Stumpfegger carried out experiments on the transplantation of bones, nerves, and muscles in Hohenlychen.

When Himmler realized that the War was ending, he believed that he could present himself positively to the Allies. He negotiated with the head of the Swedish Red Cross, Folke Bernadotte, a member of the Swedish royal family and met with him in Hohenlychen. During these talks, the White Buses rescue mission was agreed upon. However, Himmler's intended surrender did not take place. At the end of the war, the military hospital was completely evacuated. During this time, Himmler's field command post, codenamed "Steiermark", was also located in Hohenlychen. The command post was located in a train which stood on the Britz-Fürstenberg line.

As the buildings were marked with red crosses on the roof, there were initially no bombing raids during the war. However, thirty-two soldiers died in an air raid on April 27, 1945, and two days later the largely intact sanatorium was handed over to Soviet units without a fight. The Red Army, under their commander Nazarov, looted and destroyed the facilities. Some of the operating and X-ray equipment was destroyed or taken away. St. Helen's Chapel was also a victim of this destruction. The altar and organ were taken away and the chapel was used as a fuel depot.

== After the Second World War ==
Karl Gebhardt, who had fled to Flensburg in the last days of the war was arrested shortly afterwards. At the Nuremberg Doctors' Trial in 1948 he was charged with crimes against humanity and sentenced to death. His assistant doctors Fritz Fischer and Herta Oberheuser were sentenced to life imprisonment and twenty years' imprisonment respectively. Following their escape from the Führerbunker a few hours after Hitler's suicide, Ludwig Stumpfegger and Martin Bormann committed suicide at the Lehrter station in Berlin using cyanide capsules.

The Soviet armed forces in Germany used the sanatoriums as a military hospital and maternity unit. The sanatorium no longer reached its former size and was partly converted into accommodation for soldiers. On August 31, 1993, the last Soviet detachment left.

During the GDR era, Deutsche Post ran a vacation camp here for the children of its employees.

== After 2005 ==
In 2009, Freiberg civil engineer Michael Neumann bought a part of the complex - nine buildings on twelve hectares - from the state of Brandenburg. Neumann then developed a concept for a park residence in Lychen. In his spirit - he died in 2019 - his daughter Anne Neumann and relatives have continued to pursue these plans. The development consists of fully accessible rental apartments, vacation apartments and a bistro. Many of the listed buildings have already been renovated.

== In literature ==
In the Prix Goncourt winning novel, Les Bienveillantes, the Hohenlychen Sanatorium was the location of the protagonist Maximilian Aue's hospitalisation after having been shot in the head at Stalingrad.

== Sources ==
Hans Waltrich. Aufstieg und Niedergang der Heilanstalten Hohenlychen (1902 bis 1945). Strelitzia, Blankensee Press, 2001.

This article proves to be a fairly correct translation of the article de:Heilanstalten Hohenlychen in the German Wikipedia.
