= Wilhelm Beiglböck =

German Nazi physician (1905–1963)

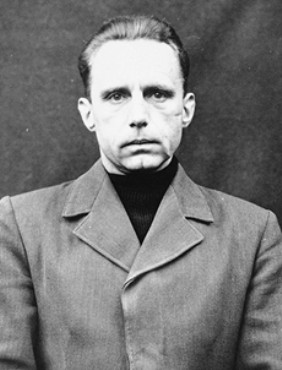
- Beiglböck in U.S. custody, c. 1946-47
- Born: 10 October 1905; Hochneukirchen, Austria-Hungary
- Died: 22 November 1963 (aged 58); Buxtehude, West Germany
- Occupation: Physician
- Organization: Luftwaffe
- Political party: Nazi Party
- Convictions: War crimes Crimes against humanity
- Trial: Doctors' Trial
- Penalty: 15 years imprisonment; commuted to 10 years imprisonment

Wilhelm Franz Josef Beiglböck (10 October 1905 – 22 November 1963) was an internist Nazi physician and held the title of Consulting Physician to the German Luftwaffe during World War II. In the 1947 Doctors' Trial, he was tried and convicted of war crimes and crimes against humanity for conducting human experimentation involving seawater on prisoners at Dachau concentration camp; he was sentenced to 15 years imprisonment, but his sentence was commuted to 10 years and he was released in 1951. He was found dead in a stairwell in 1963.

== Education and war crimes ==
Beiglböck attended Stiftsgymnasium Melk and studied medicine at the University of Vienna. During his studies there, he became active in Wiener Burschenschaft Moldavia. First, he worked as an assistant at the Medical University Clinic in Vienna for Franz Chvostek junior and afterwards for Hans Eppinger.

From 1933, he was a member of the Nazi Party and, from 1934, of the Sturmabteilung (SA), the Nazi paramilitary organization, in which he was promoted to the rank of SA-Obersturmbannführer (lieutenant colonel). In 1939, he made his habilitation and, in 1940, he became chief doctor under Eppinger. From May 1941, Beiglböck worked as a Stabsarzt (medical officer) in the Luftwaffe. In 1944, he became an extrabudgetary professor at the University of Vienna. During the war, he performed human experimentation involving seawater on inmates at Dachau concentration camp.

== Trial ==
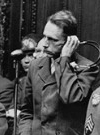
Wilhelm Beiglböck pleading "not guilty" at the Doctors' Trial.

After the war, Beiglböck was arrested by the British, who then transferred him to U.S. custody. He was a defendant in the Nuremberg Doctor's Trial. During his trial, one of his surviving victims, Karl Höllenreiner, rushed at him with a knife. Höllenreiner was sentenced to 90 days in prison for contempt of court but was released on probation four days later. Beiglböck was convicted of war crimes and crimes against humanity, and sentenced to 15 years in prison. Beiglböck's sentence was commuted to 10 years in January 1951, and he was released from prison that December.

In early 1947, the Vienna prosecution initiated proceedings against Beiglböck because of war crimes, mistreatment, and violation of human rights. The Vienna proceedings ended in October 1947.

== Release and post-war career ==
Since Beiglböck's license to practice medicine had not been revoked, he was allowed to resume working as a doctor. After his release, he was controversially given a temporary job at the University of Freiburg hospital. Beiglböck then worked at the Buxtehude Hospital, where he became the head physician of the internal medicine department.

The German Society of Internal Medicine (DGIM) campaigned for Beiglböck's rehabilitation. A three-member commission was formed to address Beiglböck's conviction. Multiple other prominent DGIM members sought to exonerate him via expert opinions and statements. The expert opinions relied on the standards established by the Nuremberg trials. However, all but one of the experts assumed that the test subjects had been volunteers. The experts claimed no deaths or long-term damage had occurred among the test subjects, and that Beiglböck had acted with the best medical intentions. The opinions were based entirely on files submitted to the experts by Beiglböck's attorney. None of the experts had seen any of the test subjects themselves, and most of them had never met Beiglböck.

In 1956, Beiglböck was elected to the DGIM committee, where he served until 1962. In 1959, the public prosecutor in Bückeburg opened a new investigation against Beiglböck, but dropped the case in 1960. In 1962, the Austrian Medical Association invited Beiglböck to give a medical lecture in Vienna. This was met with opposition from the Social Democratic Party of Austria and the local Jewish community. The administrative committee of the city of Buxtehude supported Beiglböck and said he was not guilty of the crimes for which he had been convicted. However, his invitation was rescinded.

== Death ==
In 1963, Beiglböck was found dead in a stairwell. Stille Hilfe, a relief organization for the SS, was his official heir. The circumstances of Beiglböck's death remain unclear. It is rumored that he was murdered, as he had received threatening letters before his death.

Beiglböck's supporters continued to claim that the prisoners had volunteered for his experiments, and that he had been completely exonerated by the DGIM. During Beiglböck's funeral, a state physician representative said that "after the war, he was caught up in a wheelwork of hatred that knew no justice."

"Today his research during the Nazi period is being continued in the U.S. A West German newspaper reported that while Beiglböck's "innocence was clearly proven by the statements of those involved and by scientific expert opinions, most recently by that of the highest professional body in the Federal Republic, the Deutschen Gesellschaft für innere Medizin, and Professor Beiglböck was fully rehabilitated, these matters were taken up again last year by trying to prevent a lecture before the Vienna Medical Chamber. Professor Beiglböck suffered greatly from this defamation, since he saw Vienna as his home, not only as a human being but also as a scientist, to which he was thus denied access." [citation needed]

During a meeting in Wiesbaden in 1964, a DGIM official declared that "Wilhelm Beiglböck was a true student of Eppinger. Rich in fruitful thoughts. His brilliant rise at the Vienna Clinic was abruptly and undeservedly interrupted by the misfortune of his detachment to carry out the so-called seawater experiments. It must be said again at this point that the review of these experiments by a commission of the Deutsche Gesellschaft für innere Medizin, chaired by Mr. Oehme, absolved him of any guilt. Beiglböck deserves our full recognition and veneration as a human being, physician, and researcher."

== See also ==
- Karl Höllenreiner
