= Irene D. Long =

American aerospace physician (1950–2020)

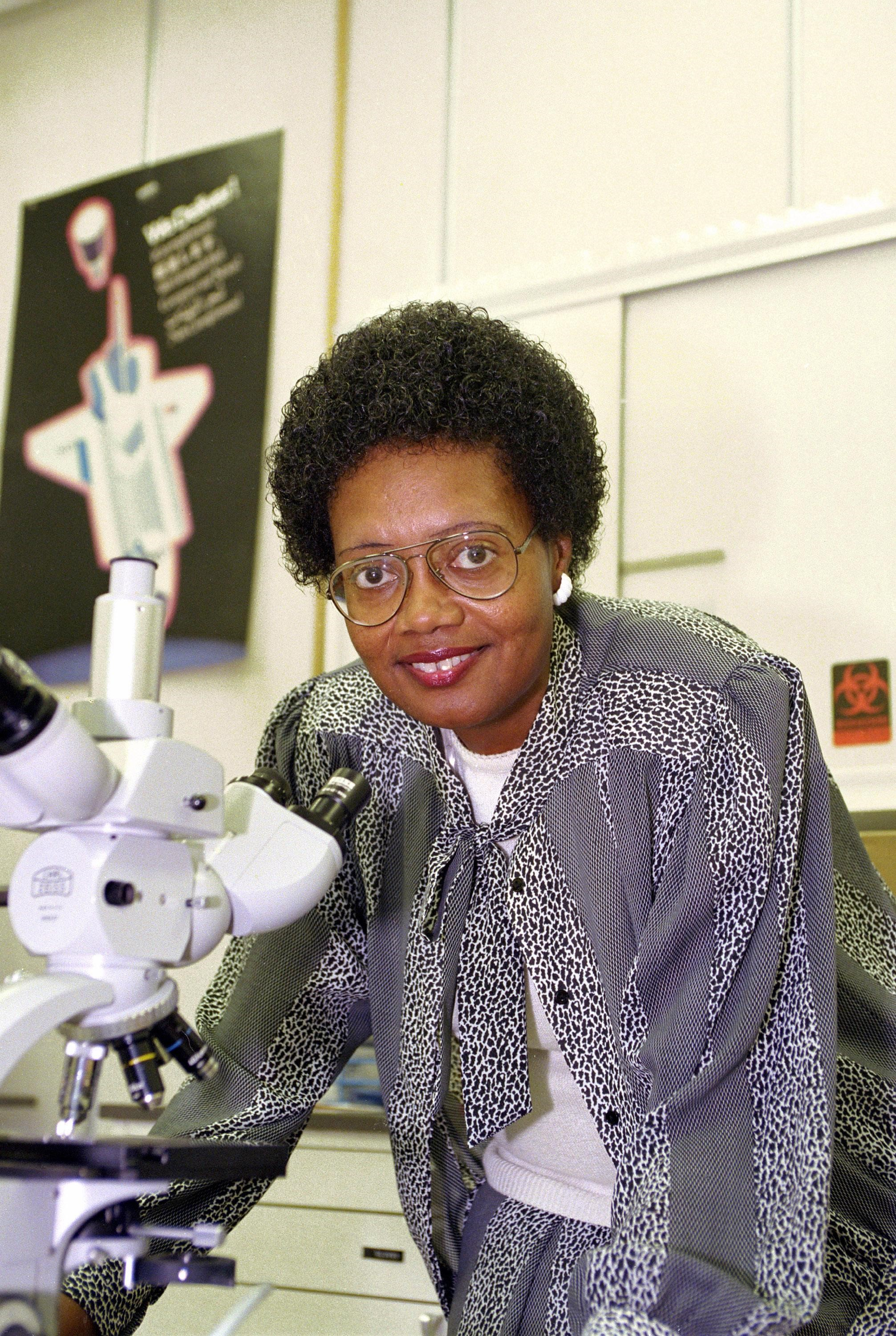
- Dr. Irene D. Long at work
- Born: November 16, 1950; Cleveland, Ohio
- Died: August 4, 2020 (aged 69)
- Education: Northwestern University (B.A., Biology) Saint Louis University (MD) Wright State University (MS, aerospace medicine)

Irene Duhart Long (November 16, 1950 – August 4, 2020) was an American physician and was an official at the U.S. National Aeronautics and Space Administration. She was the first female chief medical officer at the Kennedy Space Center.

== Early life and education ==
Long, the second of two children was born to Andrew and Heloweise Davis Duhart in Cleveland, Ohio. She had long been fascinated by the reports of space program she watched on television. At the age of nine, she told her parents she was going to have a career in aerospace medicine. She graduated from East High School in Cleveland, and in 1973, she received her bachelor's degree in biology from Northwestern University. In 1977, Long received her medical degree from the Saint Louis University School of Medicine followed by residencies at the Cleveland Clinic, Mt. Sinai Hospital in Cleveland, Ohio, and Wright State University in Dayton, Ohio, as the second civilian to enter the Wright State University School of Medicine's aerospace medicine program, and where she received her Masters of Science degree in aerospace medicine.

== Career ==
Long published a research paper in 1982 regarding sickle-cell anemia, a genetic disease affecting the red blood cells. Her paper went over the potential dangers of flying towards those with the sickle-cell trait, due to the lower amounts of oxygen levels at higher altitudes. This research ultimately helped reassure people with sickle-cell trait that flying would do no harm.

In 1982, Long fulfilled her childhood dream by joining NASA as a physician, becoming a part of the medical staff at NASA's Kennedy Space Center, eventually being chosen as the first African-American woman heading the Occupational Medicine and Environmental Health Office. She contributed to the creation of the Spaceflight and Life Sciences Training Program in 1985 which encourages women and minority college students to learn about space physiology. Notably, she was the medical officer on duty Jan. 28, 1986, the day of the space shuttle Challenger disaster. In 1994, she was appointed director of the Biomedical Operations and Research Office at the Kennedy Space Center. In 2000, she was appointed as Chief Medical Officer and associate director of Spaceport Services, along with being the first minority women to achieve the civilian equivalent of a general's rank at Kennedy Space Center. She retired at the age of 63 and David Tipton assumed the duties as Chief Medical Officer in 2013. She worked for NASA for 31 years. Director Hortense Diggs. “She was Kennedy’s first ‘Hidden Figure.’”

== Inclusion Efforts ==
As the first female and the first minority to hold the position of chief medical officer at NASA's Kennedy Space Center in Florida, Long was one of the foremost women who advocated for the inclusion of minorities at her place of work. One of her accomplishments includes the creation of Spaceflight and Life Sciences Training Program in partnership with Florida Agricultural and Mechanical University (FAMU) aimed at encouraging women and minority college students to explore careers in science.

A Kennedy Employee Assistance Counselor, Patricia Bell, had this to say about her, "One of the admirable qualities of Irene Long was her inclusion mentality regarding women in the workplace.... She was a front runner in advocating for women."

== Awards ==
- 1986 - Kennedy Space Center Federal Woman of the Year Award
- 1995 - Society of NASA Flight Surgeons Presidential Award
- 1998 - Women in Aerospace Outstanding Achievement Award
- 2001 - Ohio Women's Hall of Fame
- 2005 - Lifetime Achievement Award, Women of Color Technology Awards Conference
- 2010 - Strughold Award, Space Medicine Association
