= Frances Meehan Latterell =

American botanist

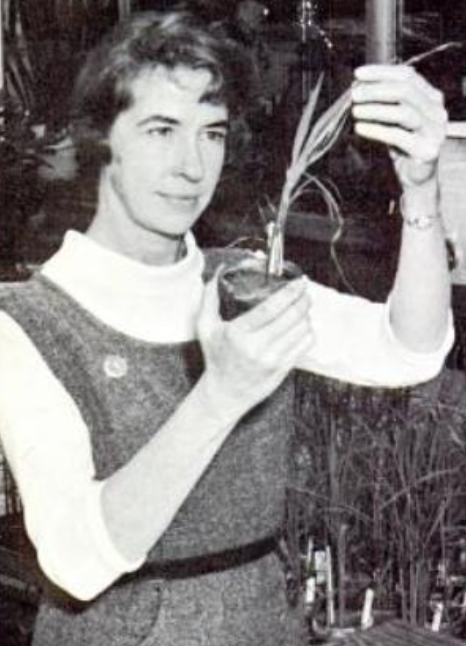
- Frances Meehan Latterell, from a 1967 publication of the United States Army
- Born: December 21, 1920; Kansas City, Missouri
- Died: November 5, 2008 (aged 87)
- Occupation: Plant pathologist
- Spouse: Richard Latterell

Frances Meehan Latterell (December 21, 1920 – November 5, 2008) was an American plant pathologist whose research in the late 1940s opened a major new area of inquiry into the physiological basis of plant disease. She was the senior author on a classic 1947 paper showing that the toxin victorin, produced by the pathogenic fungus Helminthosporium victoriae, caused symptoms of Victoria blight of oats, a new disease first described by Latterell and her major professor in 1946. This discovery of a host-specific toxin, as victorin was later named, gave scores of subsequent researchers new model systems for studying plant disease.

== Life ==
Latterell, a native of Kansas City, Missouri, an accomplished child pianist, received her BA degree from the University of Kansas City and MS and PhD degrees from Iowa State University. During her career as research plant pathologist, US army biological laboratories, Fort Detrick, Maryland and plant pathologist, US Department of Agriculture, Agricultural Research Service, Frederick, Maryland, she conducted extensive research on cereal diseases, including gray leaf spot of corn and rice blast. In recognition of her long and active membership in the Potomac Division of the American Phytopathological Society, Latterell was given the Division's Distinguished Service Award in 1987.

After retirement in 1996 she and her husband, Dr. Richard Latterell, an environmentalist and biology professor emeritus at Shepherd University, were active in animal welfare and environmental causes including water pollution and lead arsenate pollution in housing developments built on former apple orchards in Jefferson County, West Virginia, where they lived in an 18th-century farmhouse nearby Moler's Crossroads. They were participants in local zoning and political campaigns. From 2005 to 2007 R. Latterell and other citizens were the targets of a SLAPP suit for two million dollars in damages, seeking to punish them for their citizen activism. R. Latterell and the two other defendants were granted summary judgment in April, 2007 by the Circuit Court of Berkeley County, West Virginia in a decision upholding the defendants' First Amendment right to utilize administrative proceedings. Vegetarian, atheist, and childless, in 2005 the Latterells put their farm under a perpetual conservation easement under the auspices of the West Virginia Farmland Protection Act, a statute whose passage the Latterells actively supported.

Francis Meehan Latterell died of cancer on November 5, 2008.

== Toxins Cause Disease ==
The idea that toxins caused plant diseases goes back to papers in 1886 and 1913, but Latterell's 1947 paper and a 1955 paper by H. H. Luke gave the first proofs. Latterell showed that fungus creates a toxin which causes the same symptoms as Victoria blight on the same oat cultivars which suffer from Victoria blight, but causes no symptoms on cultivars which resist the blight. Luke went on to show that different strains of the fungus create different levels of toxin, which correlate with the effects seen in oats.

She was the only female scientist to participate in a ground-breaking meeting on “The Rice Blast Disease” organized by IRRI in 1963.

In 1973 Latterell and Luke shared the prestigious Ruth Allen Award in plant pathology. Its citation said, "The work of these two investigators provided the impetus for, and guided the direction of, much of the research on the role of toxins in plant diseases during the past two decades, victorin alone has been the subject of more than 100 research reports from several different laboratories. Their work also served as the model for research on many other diseases in which toxins play a role. Laboratory exercises based on the methods developed with victorin are a routine part of plant pathology courses in a large number of institutions. The demonstration that toxins may provide valid substitutes for pathogens led to practical applications in mass screening for disease resistance and in toxin tests for identification of mixtures in seed lots."

The Ruth Allen Award has been given since 1966 by the American Phytopathological Society. It honors individuals who have made an outstanding, innovative research contribution that has changed, or has the potential to change, the direction of research in any field of plant pathology. She also received the National Science Foundation Lifetime Achievement Award.

On August 17, 2010, Frances Latterell was posthumously recognized at the 5th International Rice Blast Conference with a Lifetime Dedication to Rice Blast Research Award.

The fungus' asexual stage was called Helminthosporium victoriae when Latterell and Luke published their work. Since then it has been renamed Bipolaris victoriae. Its sexual stage (teleomorph) is called Cochliobolus victoriae.

Latterell's classic paper was "Differential Phytotoxicity of Metabolic By-Products of Helminthosporium victoriae" published in Science, v. 104, pp. 413–414, September 19, 1947.
