= Adolf Pokorny =

Austrian dermatologist, defendant in the Doctors' Trial at Nuremberg

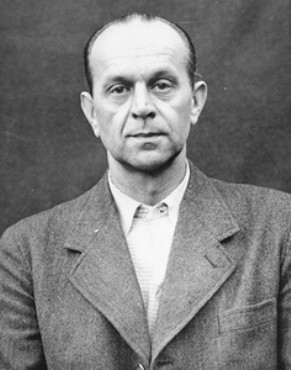
- Adolf Pokorny as a defendant in Nuremberg, 1946
- Born: July 25, 1895; Vienna, Austria-Hungary
- Died: unknown
- Known for: Defendant in the Doctors' Trial at Nuremberg
- Medical career
- Field: Dermatology
- Institutions: Austro-Hungarian army

Adolf Pokorny (born 25 July 1895 in Vienna, Austria, d. unknown) was an Austrian dermatologist and aspiring Nazi. In the 1947 Doctors' Trial he was accused of war crimes and crimes against humanity for involuntary sterilization experiments on concentration camp prisoners, but he was acquitted.

== Early years ==
Pokorny's father was a lieutenant colonel in the Austro-Hungarian army, and was frequently transferred to different countries in Eastern Europe; the family moved with him.

== World War I and interwar period ==
Pokorny was drafted into the Austro-Hungarian army and served from March 1915 to September 1918 in the First World War.

He completed his medical doctorate on 22 March 1922 and received his medical license. After two years of clinical training, he opened a practice in Komotau.

== Nazi affiliation and forced sterilization research ==
His application to join the Nazi Party was declined in 1939, because he was married to a Jewish physician, Dr. Lilly Weil, with whom he had two children and from whom he had been divorced in April 1935. While the children survived the war in the UK, Lilly Pokorná as an internee in Ghetto Terezin led the first radiology station in the camp. After the war, she emigrated with the children to Brazil.

During World War II, Pokorny worked as a medical officer of the German Armed Forces. Despite not being a member of the SS or the Nazi Party, Pokorny wrote to Heinrich Himmler to suggest sterilization of Russian prisoners of war utilizing the sap of the caladium plant, which, according to an article in a medical journal, was thought to cause sterilization in mice. Pokorny suggested the forced, covert sterilization of millions of prisoners, and wrote that he was "led by the idea that the enemy must not only be conquered but destroyed" (emphasis in original) and the immense importance of this drug "in the present fight of our people." He continued:

If, on the basis of this research, it were possible to produce a drug which after a relatively short time, effects an imperceptible sterilization on human beings, then we should have a new powerful weapon at our disposal. The thought alone that 3 million Bolsheviks, at present German prisoners, could be sterilized so that they could be used as laborers but be prevented from reproduction, opens the most far reaching perspectives.

This was received by Himmler with great interest, who ordered the procurement of caladium seguinum with the intention of conducting sterilization experiments on prisoners in Dachau concentration camp.

== Doctors' Trial ==
Pokorny was tried by the American Military Tribunal No. I (also known as the Doctors' Trial) in August 1947. Despite his letter to Himmler and the proof that forced sterilization experiments using caladium seguinum were conducted in the camps, Pokorny was found to have had no direct involvement in compulsory sterilization experiments, and was acquitted.
