= Fritz Fischer (medical doctor) =

Nazi German human experimenter (1912–2003)

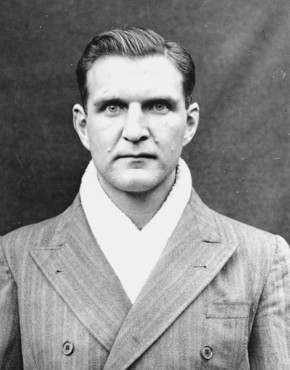
- Mugshot of Fischer
- Born: 5 October 1912; Berlin, German Empire
- Died: 2003 (aged 90–91); Ingelheim am Rhein, Germany
- Occupation: Physician
- Political party: Nazi Party
- Status: Deceased
- Convictions: War crimes Crimes against humanity Membership in a criminal organization
- Trial: Doctors' Trial
- Penalty: Life imprisonment; commuted to 15 years imprisonment

Fritz Ernst Fischer (5 October 1912 – 2003) was a Nazi German medical doctor who performed medical atrocities on inmates of the Ravensbrück concentration camp. He was tried and convicted of war crimes and crimes against humanity in the 1947 Doctors' Trial; he was sentenced to life imprisonment, but his sentence was commuted to 15 years and he was released in 1954.

== Early life and war crimes ==
Fischer was born in Berlin. He studied medicine first at Bonn, later at Berlin and Leipzig, and finally graduated in Hamburg in 1938. He joined the SS in 1934 (ultimately reaching the rank of Sturmbannführer [major]) and became a member of the NSDAP in June 1937. On 1 November 1939, he was assigned to the Waffen-SS of the SS-Department of the Hohenlychen Sanatorium as a physician and SS Second Lieutenant.

In 1940, he became troop physician of the SS Division Leibstandarte Adolf Hitler. After having been wounded he was posted back to Hohenlychen and worked in the camp hospital of the Ravensbrück concentration camp as a surgical assistant to Karl Gebhardt. He participated in the surgical experiments carried out on concentration camp inmates there.

== Trial and later life ==
After World War II, he was tried in the Doctors' Trial in Nuremberg, convicted of war crimes and crimes against humanity, and was condemned to life imprisonment. His sentence was reduced to 15 years in 1951 and he was released in March 1954.

Fischer subsequently regained his license to practice medicine and started a new career at the chemical company Boehringer in Ingelheim, where he stayed until his retirement.

Based on available records, when he died in 2003, aged 90 or 91, he was the last known living of those indicted at the Doctors' Trial.
