= Preiner Gscheid Pass =

Mountain pass in the Austrian Alps

- Location within Alps
- Elevation: 1,070 metres (3,510 ft)

Third Approach
- Location: Austria
- Range: Alps
- Coordinates: 47°40′N 15°43′E

Preiner Gscheid Pass (el. 1070 m.) is a high mountain pass in the Austrian Alps in the Bundesland of Lower Austria. The pass connects Kapellen and Reichenau an der Rax.

== See also ==
- List of highest paved roads in Europe
- List of mountain passes
