= Mars jar =

Container simulating the atmosphere of Mars

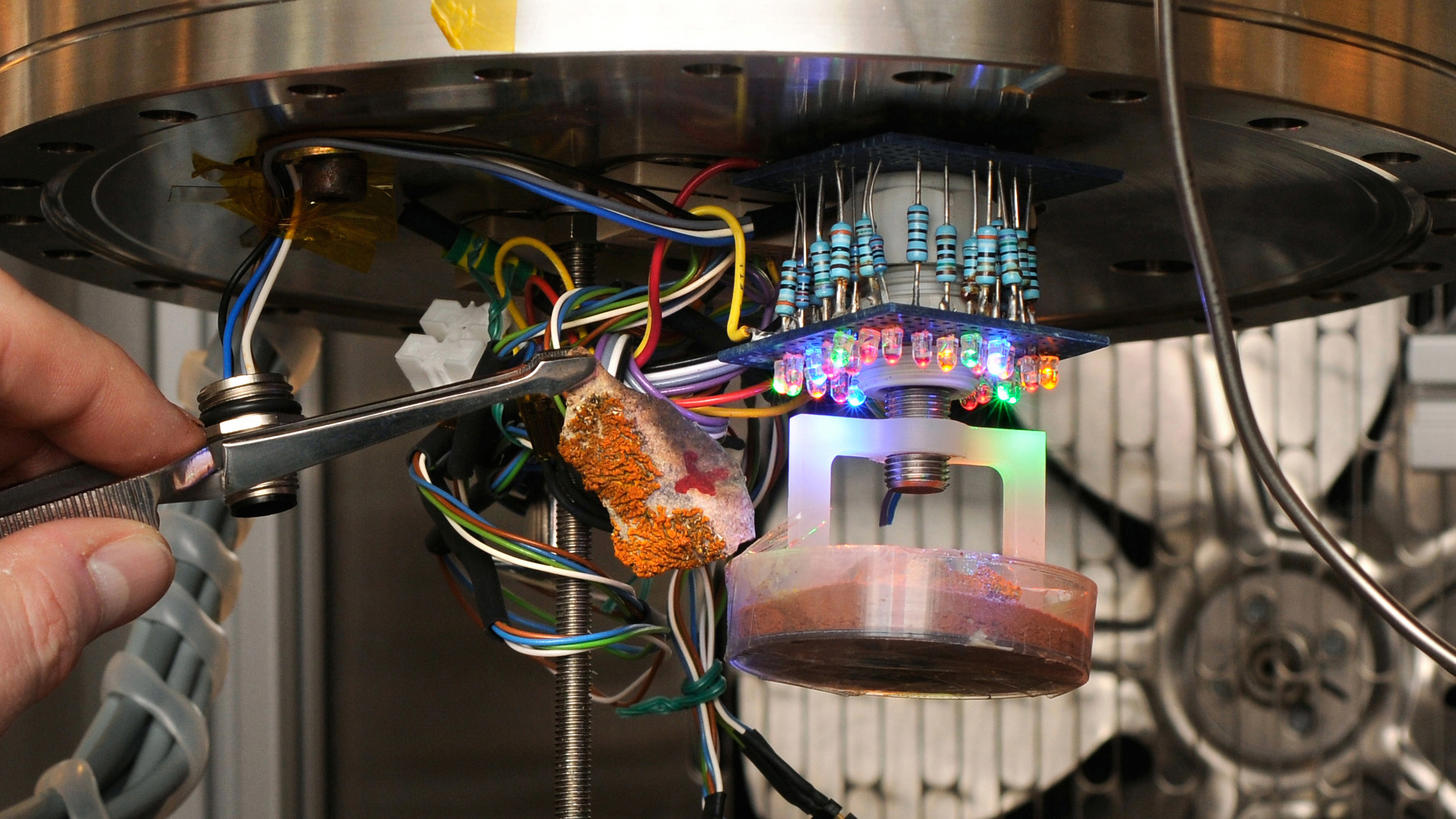
A small Mars jar at the German Aerospace Center (2012)

A Mars jar or Mars simulation chamber is a container that simulates the atmosphere of the planet Mars. It is used in astrobiology experiments to determine what kind of life on Mars might be viable.

== Features ==
Mars jars have evolved from simple glass containers that resembled kitchen jars in the 1950s to sophisticated temperature-controlled pressure vessels that are now more commonly called "Mars environmental simulation chamber" or "Mars atmosphere simulation chamber". In such devices, a variety of aspects of the Martian environment can be replicated, such as atmospheric composition and pressure, surface materials, temperature cycles and solar radiation.

The Martian environment differs wildly from not only laboratory conditions on Earth, but also in location, season, and time of day. Surface temperatures can go as high as -63 °C, but can sink as low as -150 °C. The Martian atmosphere, which is 95% carbon dioxide by volume, condenses significantly in each pole's winter; as a result, average surface pressure can vary from season to season by up to 25%. Each combination of factors offers its own challenges. Cold temperatures may shrink fixtures and seals, compromising pressure. Which conditions a chamber is designed to simulate will vary from chamber to chamber according to the experiment. For instance, an experiment to examine the condensation of dry ice in the polar regions may neglect UV radiation.

Different chambers may employ different techniques to recreate these conditions. Temperature is often regulated through active cooling systems, while hypobaric pressure may be maintained through what can be multiple layers of pumps. The hypoxic environment can be achieved through displacement via the introduction of canister gases or through the introduction of anaerobic pouches. Some studies may only require a "bell jar" apparatus while others may require large, elaborate systems. At the low end of temperatures thermal shrouding may be required.

Of great interest in many studies are atmosphere/surface interactions. Chemical and physical characteristics of the Martian dust and regolith are critical to experiments and often difficult to match; many of the geochemical and geophysical processes Earth basalts undergo require the presence of oxygen or water, both of which are nearly perfectly absent from Mars. Many chambers may employ simulants of Mars regolith, collected from basalt beds on Earth. Popular standards include JSC Mars-1 from the slopes of Mauna Kea and JPL's Mojave Mars Simulant (MMS) from Boron, California.

== History ==
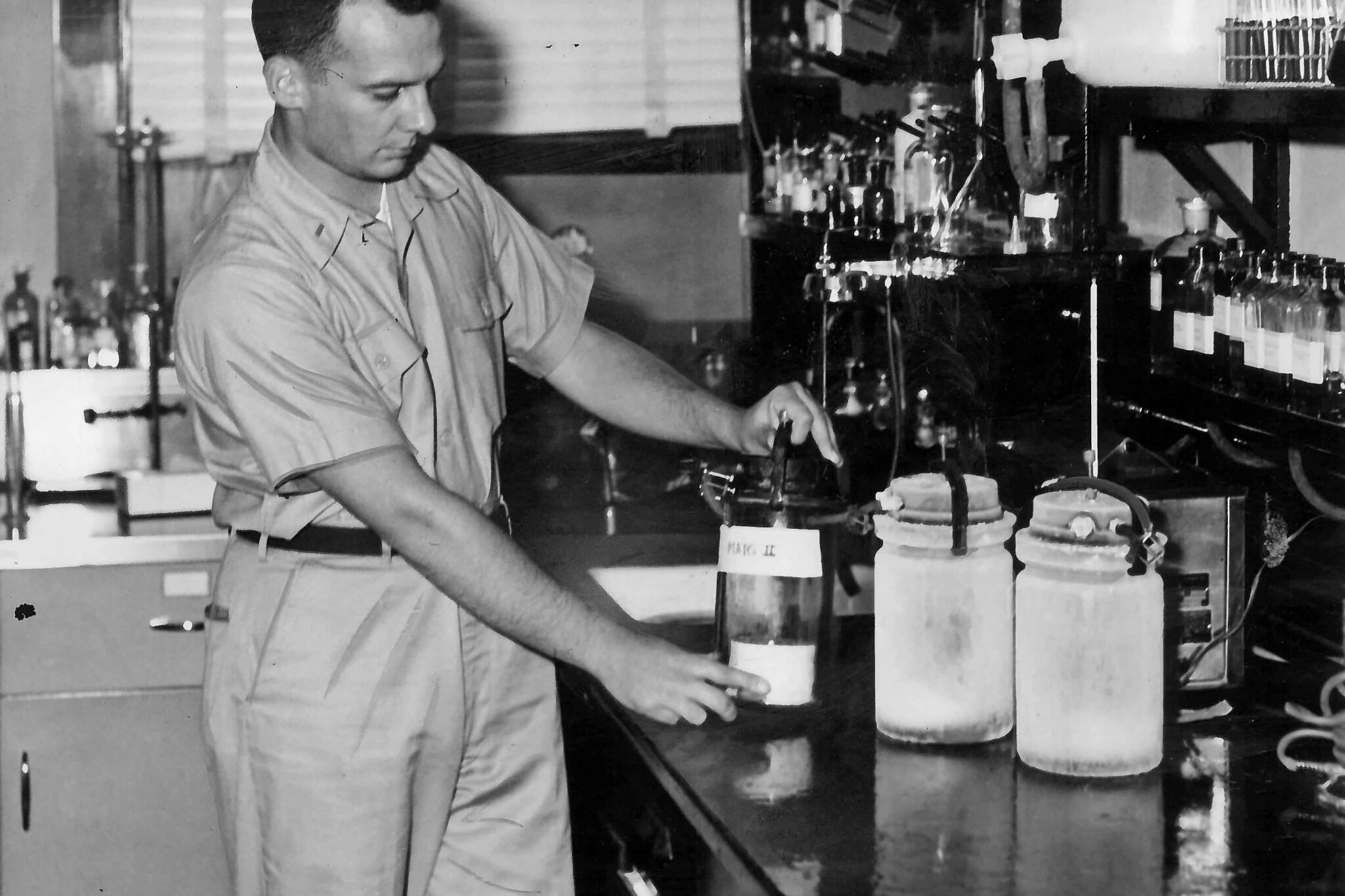
Mars jars in 1957 in the U.S. Air Force's School of Aviation Medicine, Department of Microbiology

The concept and the name "Mars jar" originate with Hubertus Strughold, a German physiologist and pioneering space medicine researcher. Strughold described Mars jars in his 1953 publication The Green and Red Planet: A Physiological Study of the Possibility of Life on Mars, in which he also coined the term "astrobiology". By 1956, Mars jars were part of U.S. Air Force research projects into crewed Mars missions.

The concept was popularized outside military circles in 1957 by the biologist Joshua Lederberg, who proposed it to NASA leaders, and then by the astrophysicist and science educator Carl Sagan, who featured Mars jars in his TV shows. According to the science historian Jordan Bimm, Strughold's work was not mentioned in later descriptions of Mars jars because civilian scientists wanted to avoid association with the military and with Strughold's involvement in human experimentation in Nazi Germany.

== Study of other planetary atmospheres ==
Mars jar technology has been used to study other environments, including those of Titan, Venus, and Pluto, each with unique challenges. Titan chambers require even colder temperatures than Mars ones, but often with hyperbaric pressures; experiments for Titan's upper atmosphere often involve cold plasma, which introduces its own challenges. Venus chambers are hyberbaric, hyperthermic, and full of toxic and corrosive gases, posing significant hazards to the personnel and facilities of their laboratories.
