= Herta Oberheuser =

German physician and war criminal (1911–1978)

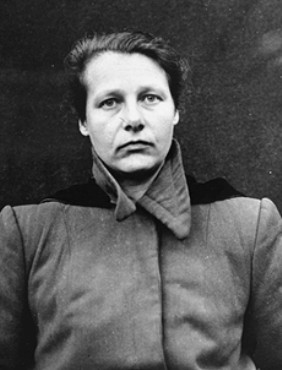
- Oberheuser in 1946 or 1947
- Born: 15 May 1911; Cologne, North Rhine-Westphalia, German Empire
- Died: 24 January 1978 (aged 66); Linz am Rhein, Rhineland-Palatinate, West Germany
- Occupations: Physician, field in dermatology
- Years active: 1937–1945, 1952–1958
- Known for: Performing medical atrocities on prisoners at the Ravensbrück concentration camp
- Political party: Nazi Party
- Status: Deceased
- Convictions: War crimes Crimes against humanity
- Trial: Doctors' Trial
- Penalty: 20 years imprisonment; commuted to 10 years imprisonment; served only 5 years (released for good behavior)

Herta Oberheuser (15 May 1911 – 24 January 1978) was a German Nazi physician and convicted war criminal who performed medical atrocities on prisoners at the Ravensbrück women's concentration camp. For her role in the Holocaust, she was sentenced to 20 years in prison at the Doctors' Trial, but served only five years of her sentence. A survivor of Ravensbrück called Oberheuser "a beast masquerading as a human".

== Education and Nazi Party membership ==
In 1937, Oberheuser obtained her medical degree at the University of Bonn, Germany, having specialized in dermatology. She had a residency in the department of dermatology of the University of Düsseldorf. Soon thereafter she joined the Nazi Party as an intern, and later served as doctor for the League of German Girls. During this period, she wrote a number of antisemitic tracts that would subsequently be entered into evidence at her trial. In 1940, Oberheuser was appointed to serve as an assistant to Karl Gebhardt, then Chief Surgeon of the Schutzstaffel (SS) and Heinrich Himmler's personal doctor.

== War crimes ==
Oberheuser and Gebhardt were posted to Ravensbrück in 1942 in order to conduct experiments on its prisoners, with an emphasis on finding better methods of treating infection. The experiments were performed by a group of doctors and nurses known as the 'Hohenlychen group', so named because they had worked at the SS sanatorium at Hohenlychen. The group conducted gruesome medical experiments, without anaesthetic, such as infecting wounds with rusty nails, broken shards of glass, dirt or sawdust; treating deliberately infected wounds with sulphonamide; and removing or amputating bone, muscle, and nerve tissue to study regeneration.

The experiments were conducted on 86 women, 74 of whom were Polish political prisoners. Five of the prisoners died as a direct result of the experiments and those who survived were often crippled for life. They were cruelly referred to not as human beings but as "guinea pigs" or "rabbits".

Oberheuser "did a great deal of the actual work". Her duties included conducting humiliating gynaecological examinations on women arriving at the camp, selecting young, healthy Polish inmates for the human experiments to be conducted on, infecting wounds, and assisting in all surgical procedures. She was also one of the group members responsible for post operative care of the victims, but is recalled by witnesses as having done not much other than making the injuries worse. For example, one survivor Stefania Lotocka remembers Oberheuser refusing to provide water to many victims and, when she did, mixing it with vinegar. She also ordered that victims were not to be given medicine to relieve their pain. Oberheuser later tried to justify her inhumane actions and claimed that Germans had the right to experiment, because the victims were members of the Polish underground resistance against the Nazi Regime.

== Trial ==
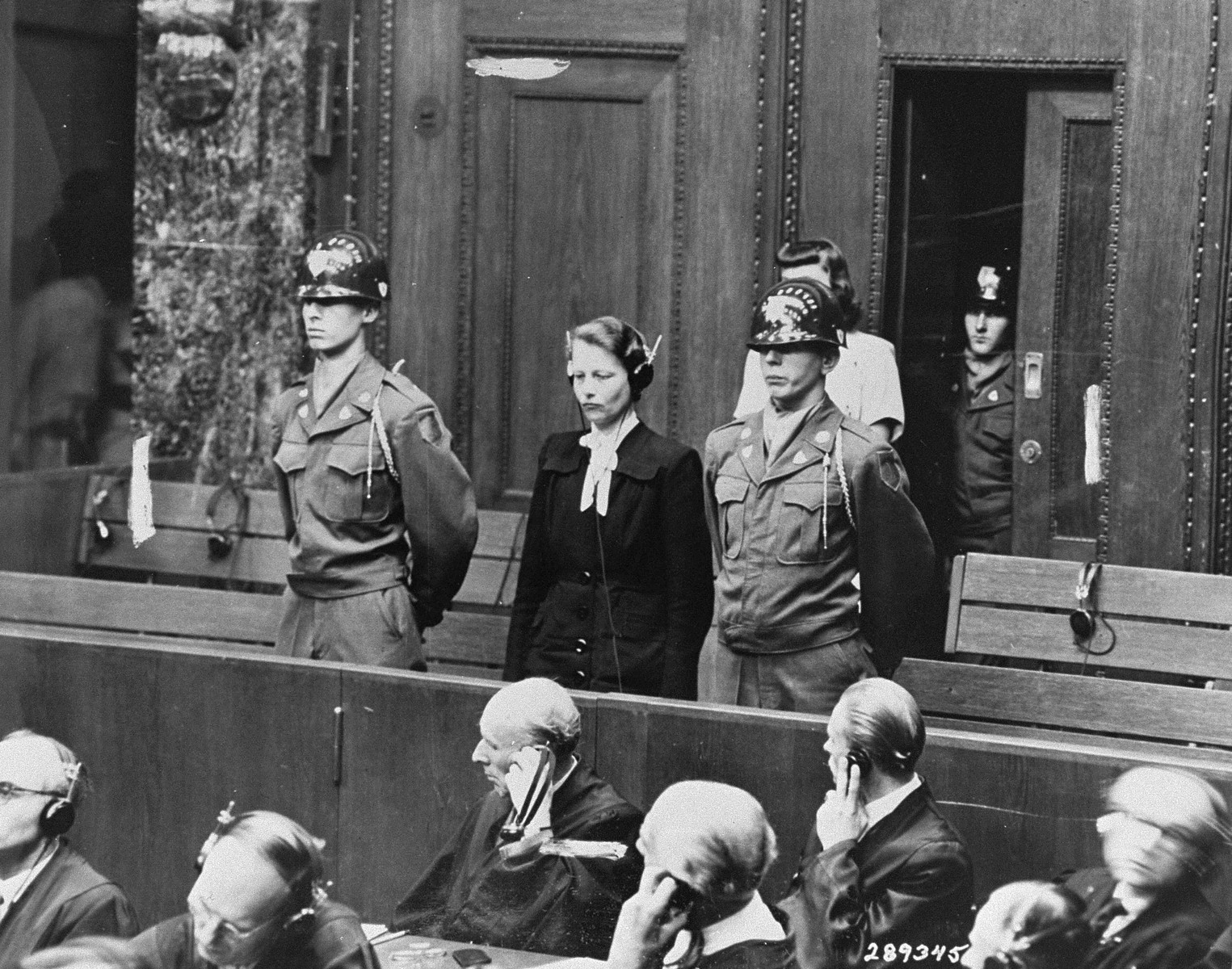
Oberheuser during sentencing to 20 years of imprisonment, Doctors' trial, Nuremberg, August 1947

When 22 medical staff from the concentration camps were on trial in the Nuremberg "Doctors' trial" in 1948, Oberheuser was the only female defendant. She commented of her gender that "being a woman didn't stop me being a good National Socialist. I think female National Socialists were every bit as valuable as men in keeping alive what we believe." She and the other members of the 'Hohenlychen group' had initially been captured by the British, but the Nuremberg Military Tribunal negotiated their transfer to U.S. custody to stand trial.

Oberheuser pleaded not guilty at her trial, but admitted in her affidavit that "I have myself dispensed five or six injections." Like the other defendants, she denied having taken part in the mass killing of Jews. She was convicted of war crimes and crimes against humanity and sentenced to 20 years in prison. Her sentence was commuted to 10 years in January 1951. She benefited from the massive protests by West German citizens and politicians over the upcoming executions of the remaining 28 war criminals who were on death row under U.S. military law and from directly petitioning the Advisory Board.

== Later life ==
Oberheuser served her sentence at Landsberg Prison, and was released after just five years in April 1952 for good behaviour. She became a family doctor in Stocksee, near Kiel, in West Germany. She lost her position in August 1958 after a Ravensbrück survivor recognized her, and the interior minister of Schleswig-Holstein, Helmut Lemke, revoked her medical license and shut down her practice. Oberheuser appealed to the Schleswig-Holstein administrative court, which rejected the appeal in December 1960. She never practiced medicine again and was fined. She died in a West German nursing home in 1978.

== Representations in popular culture ==
- Herta is a central character in the novel Lilac Girls of Ravensbrück by Martha Hall Kelly.
