= Karl Gebhardt =

German physician, war criminal, SS-Gruppenführer (1897–1948)

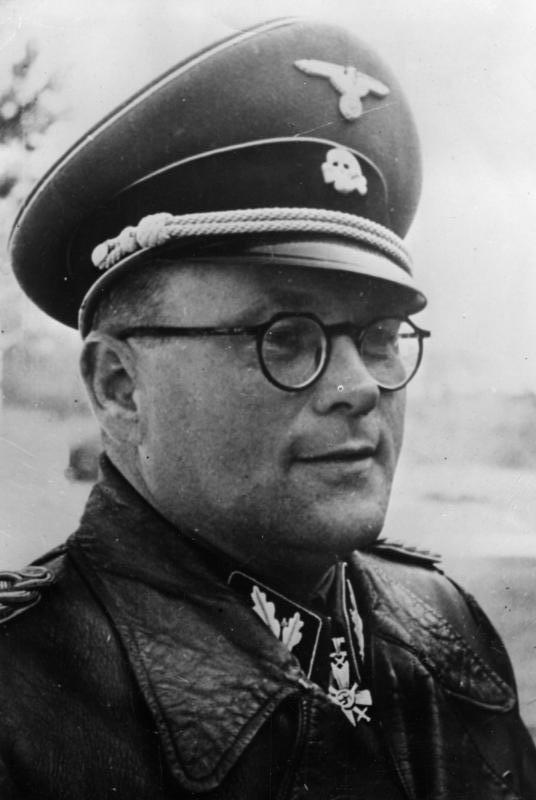
- Born: 23 November 1897; Haag in Oberbayern, Bavaria, German Empire
- Died: 2 June 1948 (aged 50); Landsberg Prison, Allied-occupied Germany
- Resting place: Ostfriedhof (Munich)
- Occupation: Physician
- Title: SS-Gruppenführer and Generalleutnant of the Waffen-SS
- Political party: Nazi Party
- Awards: Knight's Cross of the War Merit Cross
- Status: Executed by hanging
- Convictions: War crimes Crimes against humanity Membership in a criminal organization
- Trial: Doctors' Trial
- Penalty: Death

Karl Franz Gebhardt (23 November 1897 – 2 June 1948) was a German physician and a war criminal. Gebhardt was the main coordinator of a series of medical atrocities performed on inmates of the concentration camps at Ravensbrück and Auschwitz. These experiments were an attempt to defend his approach to the surgical management of grossly contaminated traumatic wounds, against the then-new innovations of antibiotic treatment of injuries acquired on the battlefield.

During the Subsequent Nuremberg Trials, Gebhardt stood trial in the Doctors' trial (American Military Tribunal No. I). He was convicted of war crimes and crimes against humanity and condemned to death on 20 August 1947. He was hanged on 2 June 1948 at Landsberg Prison in Bavaria.

== Career before World War II ==
In his student days Gebhardt had been a supporter of the national counter-revolutionary movement and was active among other things in the Volunteer Corps "the Upland Alliance." Gebhardt studied medicine in Munich beginning in 1919. In 1923, Gebhardt, a member of the Freikorps Oberland, participated in the Beer Hall Putsch. In 1924, after two years as an unpaid assistant physician he received a post as an intern at the Surgical Clinic of the Ludwig-Maximilians-Universität München. Gebhardt trained under the tutelage of Ferdinand Sauerbruch and later under Erich Lexer, finally gaining his habilitation in 1932. Gebhardt had a distinguished career prior to World War II, contributing a great deal to the development of the field of sports medicine. He wrote articles on physical medicine and rehabilitation, a textbook on sports rehabilitation and he disseminated his ideas in Germany and throughout the rest of Europe.

== Nazi Party membership and activities ==
Gebhardt's Nazi career began with his joining the Nazi Party (NSDAP) on 1 May 1933. In 1935, he moved to Berlin, where he was appointed associate professor. That year, Gebhardt joined the Schutzstaffel (SS) and was also appointed Medical Superintendent of the Hohenlychen Sanatorium in the Uckermark, which he changed from a sanatorium for tuberculosis patients into an orthopedic clinic. At Hohenlychen Sanatorium, Gebhardt started the first sports medicine clinic in Germany and developed sports programs for amputees and other disabled people. Gebhardt was also appointed to the Deutsche Hochschule für Leibesübungen (German College for Physical Education) in 1935, where he became the first professor of sports medicine in Berlin.

In 1936 he distinguished himself in his post as a head of the Medical Department of the Akademie für Sport und Leibeserziehung (Academy for Exercise and Physical Training) as senior physician of the 1936 Summer Olympics. Hohenlychen Sanatorium became the sports sanatorium for Nazi Germany and served as the central hospital for the athletes who participated in the 1936 Summer Olympics. In 1937 he became chair holder for orthopedic surgery at the University of Berlin. In 1938, Gebhardt was appointed as SS leader Heinrich Himmler's personal physician.

Gebhardt served as Chief Surgeon of the Staff of the Reich during World War II, and under his direction the Hohenlychen Sanatorium became a military hospital for the Waffen-SS.

On 27 May 1942, Himmler ordered Gebhardt dispatched to Prague in order to attend to Reinhard Heydrich, who had been wounded by an anti-tank grenade during Operation Anthropoid earlier that day. Heydrich was SS-Obergruppenführer and General der Polizei, and the acting Reichsprotektor of the Protectorate of Bohemia and Moravia. When Heydrich developed a fever after surgery for his extensive wounds, Theodor Morell, personal physician to Adolf Hitler, suggested to Gebhardt that he should treat Heydrich with sulfonamide (an early antibiotic). Gebhardt refused Morell's advice expecting Heydrich to recover without antibiotic therapy. Heydrich died of sepsis on 4 June 1942, eight days after the attack. Gebhardt's refusal to prescribe sulfonamide contributed to Heydrich's death and had many unfortunate implications for concentration camp prisoners upon whom he later conducted medical experiments.

In early 1944, Gebhardt treated Albert Speer for fatigue and a swollen knee. He nearly killed Speer until he was replaced by another physician, Dr. Friedrich Koch, who intervened on Speer's behalf. Gebhardt eventually rose to the rank of Gruppenführer in the Allgemeine SS and a Generalleutnant in the Waffen-SS.

By 22 April 1945, the day before the Red Army entered the outskirts of Berlin, Joseph Goebbels brought his wife and children into the Vorbunker to stay. Adolf Hitler and a few loyal personnel were present in the adjoining Führerbunker to direct the final defence of Berlin. Gebhardt, in his capacity as leader of the German Red Cross, approached Goebbels about taking the children out of the city with him, but he was dismissed by Goebbels.

=== Medical experiments in concentration camps ===
During the war, Gebhardt conducted medical and surgical experiments on prisoners in the concentration camps at Ravensbrück (which was close to Hohenlychen Sanatorium) and Auschwitz. At Ravensbruck he had initially faced opposition from camp commandant Fritz Suhren, who feared future legal problems given the status of most camp inmates as political prisoners, but the SS leadership backed Gebhardt, and Suhren was forced to cooperate.

In order to absolve Gebhardt for his failure to prescribe sulfonamide for Heydrich, Himmler suggested to Gebhardt that he should conduct experiments proving that sulfonamide was useless in the treatment of gangrene and sepsis. In order to vindicate his decision to not administer sulfa drugs in treating Heydrich’s wounds, he carried out a series of experiments on Ravensbrück concentration camp prisoners, breaking their legs and infecting them with various organisms in order to prove the worthlessness of the drugs in treating gas gangrene. He also attempted to transplant the limbs from camp victims to German soldiers wounded on the Eastern front. The Ravensbrück experiments were slanted in Gebhardt’s favor; women in the sulfonamide-treated experimental group received little or no nursing care, while those in the untreated control group received better care. Not surprisingly, those in the control group were more likely to survive the experiments.

== Trial and execution ==
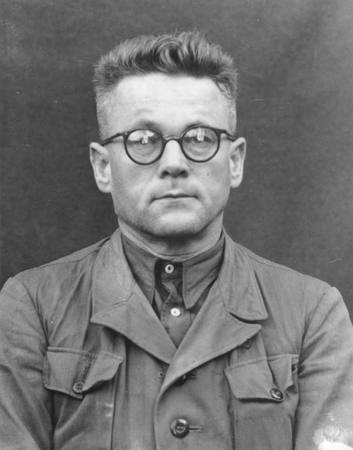
Karl Gebhardt as a defendant in the Doctors' Trial at Nuremberg

During the Subsequent Nuremberg Trials, Gebhardt stood trial in the Doctors' Trial (9 December 1946–20 August 1947), along with 22 other doctors. He was found guilty of war crimes and crimes against humanity and condemned to death on 20 August 1947. He was hanged on 2 June 1948 at Landsberg Prison in Bavaria. Unrepentant, Gebhardt's last words were, "I die without bitterness, but regret that there is still injustice in the world."

Two of Gebhardt's assistants were also tried and convicted at Nuremberg. Fritz Fischer worked in the hospital of the Ravensbrück concentration camp as a surgical assistant to Gebhardt, and participated in the surgical experiments carried out on the inmates. He was initially condemned to life imprisonment, but his sentence was reduced to 15 years in 1951 and he was released in March 1954. Fischer subsequently regained his medical license and resumed his career at the chemical company Boehringer Ingelheim, where he remained employed until his retirement. He died in 2003 at the age of 90 or 91.

Herta Oberheuser was another of Gebhardt's assistants at the Ravensbrück concentration camp. She was the only female defendant in the Doctors' Trial, where she was sentenced to 20 years in prison. She was released in April 1952 and became a family doctor in Stocksee, Germany. She lost her position in 1956 after a Ravensbrück survivor recognized her, and her medical license was revoked in 1958. She died on 24 January 1978 at the age of 66.

== See also ==
- List SS-Gruppenführer
