= Karl Genzken =

WW2 SS Doctor & war criminal

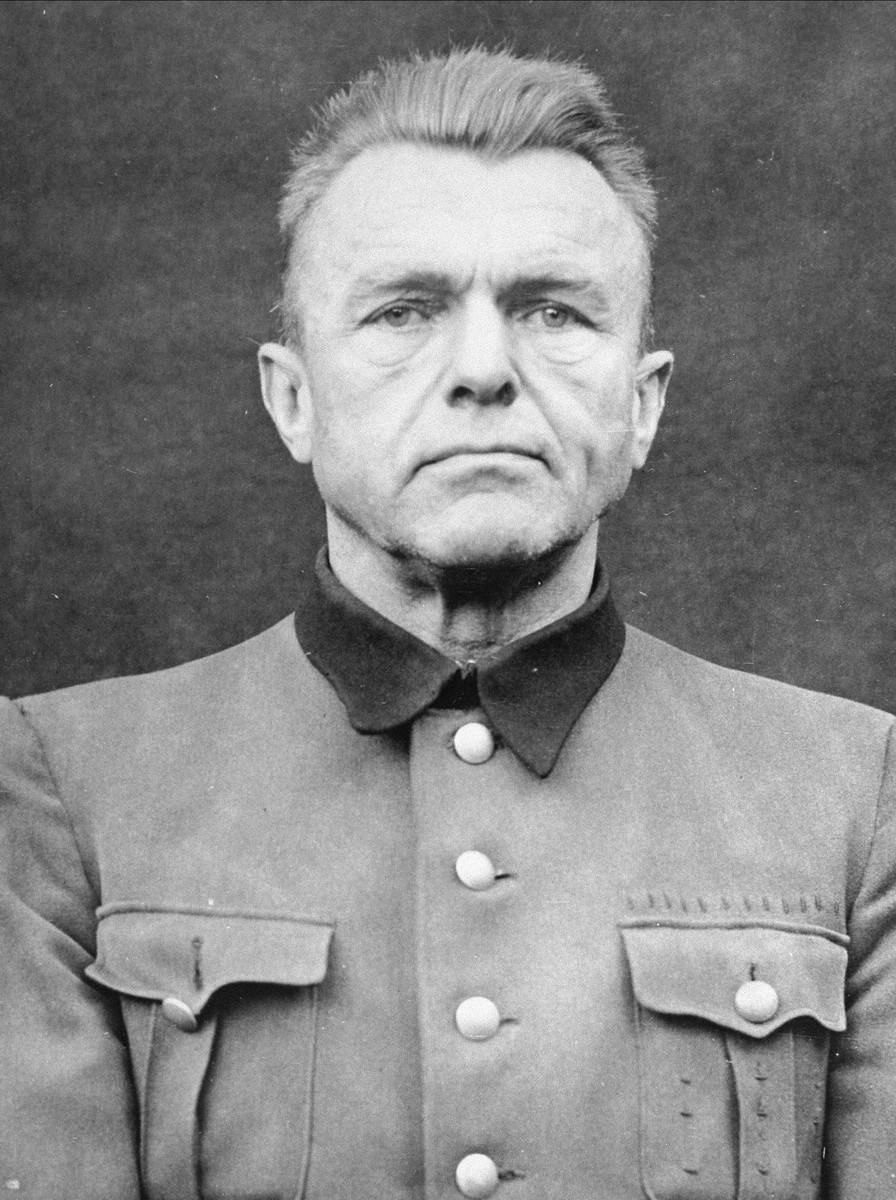
- Genzken in U.S. custody
- Born: 8 June 1885; Preetz, Province of Schleswig-Holstein, Kingdom of Prussia, German Empire
- Died: 10 October 1957 (aged 72); Hamburg, West Germany
- Title: SS-Gruppenführer and Generalleutnant of the Waffen-SS
- Political party: Nazi Party
- Status: Deceased
- Convictions: War crimes Crimes against humanity Membership in a criminal organization
- Trial: Doctors' Trial
- Penalty: Life imprisonment; commuted to 20 years imprisonment

Karl August Genzken (8 June 1885 – 10 October 1957) was a Nazi physician who committed medical atrocities on prisoners of several concentration camps. He was an SS-Gruppenführer (Major General) of the Waffen-SS and the Chief of the Medical Office of the Waffen-SS. After the war ended, he was tried and convicted as a war criminal and for crimes against humanity in the 1947 Doctors' Trial at Nuremberg. Genzken was sentenced to life imprisonment, but his sentence was commuted to 20 years and he was released in 1954.

== Nazi Party membership ==
Genzken had joined the Nazi Party on July 7, 1926 (party member No. 39,913). He joined the Schutzstaffel on November 5, 1933 (SS No. 207,954).

In 1934, he was reactivated as a reserve officer in the Naval Medical Service. After that, he transferred to the SS Operational Main Office then was promoted from an assistant medical director to the medical superintendent of the SS Hospital in Berlin, and appointed Chief of the Medical Office of the Waffen-SS in 1942. He rose to the rank of Major General in the Waffen-SS.

=== War crimes ===
Genzken was involved in a series of human experiments that were carried out on prisoners of several concentration camps. Genzken was accused and convicted of involvement in the typhus experiments conducted from December 1941 – February 1945, which were conducted for the benefit of the German armed forces to test the effectiveness of vaccines against typhus, smallpox, cholera, and other diseases. The experiments were conducted at Buchenwald and Natzweiler. Genzken was also accused of involvement in sulfanilamide experiments, poison experiments, and incendiary bomb experiments but was not convicted on these counts.

== Trial and conviction ==
Genzken was found guilty of war crimes, crimes against humanity, and membership in an illegal organization by the American Military Tribunal No. I (the Doctors' Trial). He was condemned in August 1947 to life imprisonment by the tribunal. His sentence was later reduced to 20 years and he was released in April 1954.

== See also ==
- Concentration Camps Inspectorate
- Doctors' Trial
- List SS-Gruppenführer
- Nazi human experimentation
