= Kernhofer Gscheid Pass =

Mountain pass in the Austrian Alps

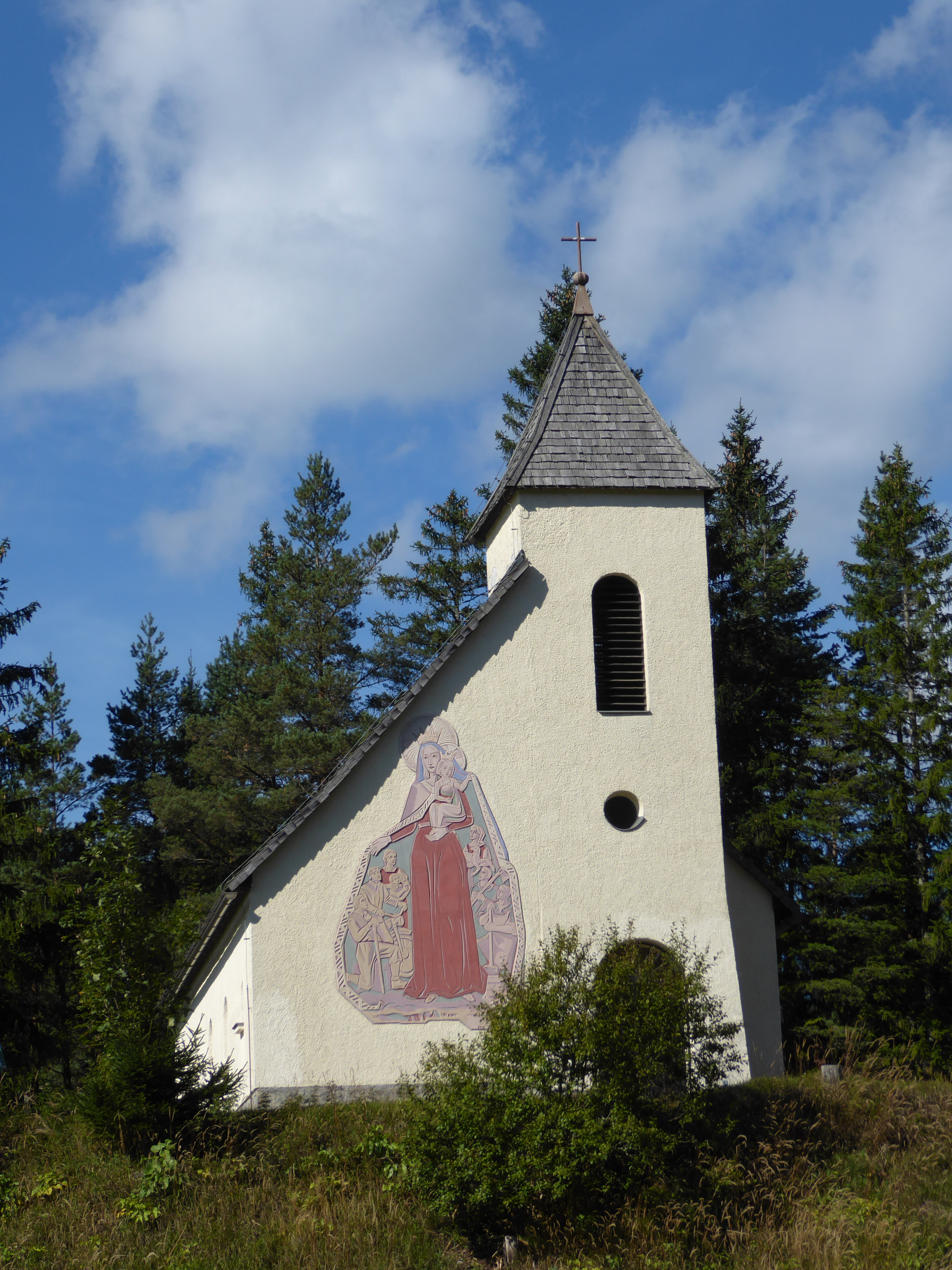
- Kapelle Maria Himmelfahrt (Chapel of the Assumption of Mary)

- Location within Alps
- Elevation: 970 metres (3,180 ft)

Third Approach
- Location: Austria
- Range: Alps
- Coordinates: 47°49′N 15°28′E

The Kernhofer Gscheid Pass (el. 970 m [3,182 ft]) is a high mountain pass in the Austrian Alps in the Bundesland of Lower Austria.

It connects Kernhof in the Traisen River valley with Terz in the Salza River valley near Mariazell. The road has a maximum grade of 13 percent.

At the pass is a small church and the Gschaid Restaurant. To the west, a winding road leads to Annaberg and into the Ötscher Nature Park.

Directly south of the pass lies the Göller (1,766 m [5,794 ft]), and five kilometres (3.1 mi) north the Tirolerkogel (1,377 m [4,518 ft]).

== See also ==
- List of highest paved roads in Europe
- List of mountain passes
