= Konrad Schäfer =

German physician (1911–c.1951)

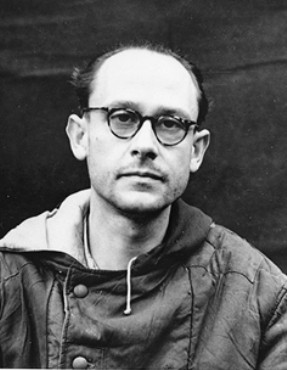
- Born: 7 January 1911; Mülhausen, German Empire
- Died: After 1951; San Antonio, Texas, United States
- Occupation: Physician

Konrad Schäfer (7 January 1911 – after 1951) was a German physician who served as a researcher at the Institute for Aviation Medicine in Berlin. During the Doctors' Trial, he was accused of conducting human experimentation in the Dachau concentration camp, but was acquitted.

Schäfer studied at the Ludwig-Maximilians-Universität München, the Friedrich Wilhelm University of Berlin, and the University of Innsbruck, and completed his studies at Heidelberg University in December 1935. Schäfer received his doctorate in 1936, and from 1937 he worked part-time as an assistant at the chemotherapeutic laboratory of Schering AG. In November 1941, he went to the Luftwaffe Medical Testing and Training Department (Sanitätsversuchs- und Lehrabteilung der Luftwaffe) in Jüterbog and reported on the results of human experiments in the Dachau concentration camp on the subject of thirst and thirst control at the Seenot Conference in October 1942. In 1944, he worked at the Reich Aviation Minister’s Research Institute for Aviation Medicine (Forschungsinstitut für Luftfahrtmedizin des Reichsluftfahrtministers). He is regarded as the inventor of a method for seawater desalination, which was tested on 44 Roma in the Dachau concentration camp in 1944. In 1947, he was tried and acquitted of various war crimes and crimes against humanity during the Doctors' Trial.

He was later invited to the United States where he conducted research for the U.S. Army Air Forces at Randolph Air Field until 1951.
