= Siegfried Ruff =

German physician

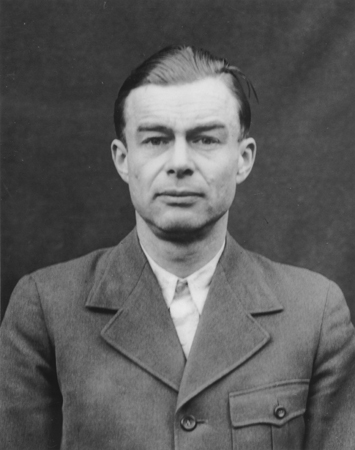
- Mugshot of Ruff
- Born: 19 February 1907; Friemersheim, German Empire
- Died: 22 April 1989 (aged 82); Bonn, West Germany
- Occupation: Physician
- Status: Acquitted
- Criminal charges: Conspiracy against peace War crimes Crimes against humanity
- Trial: Doctors' Trial

Siegfried Ruff (19 February 1907 – 22 April 1989) was a German physician who served as director of the Aviation Medicine Department at the German Experimental Institute for Aviation, and was accused of war crimes and crimes against humanity for conducting medical atrocities. He was acquitted of war crimes and recruited by the US after World War II.

== Nazi activities and Doctors' Trial ==
In the 1947 Doctors' Trial, Ruff was indicted on various war crimes allegedly committed during his time as a researcher at the Institute for Aviation. Specifically, it was alleged he had overseen experiments that had resulted in the deaths of 80 Dachau concentration camp inmates. While Ruff acknowledged human experimentation had occurred, he stated it had occurred according to the law and denied it had resulted in any deaths. Ruff was acquitted of all charges against him.

== Post-War human experimentation ==
Following World War II, Ruff was hired by the U.S. Army Air Forces to work at a United States military hospital in Heidelberg conducting experiments on human exposure to high altitudes.

In 1961 the International Academy of Aviation and Space Medicine chose to relocate its annual conference from West Germany over objections at Ruff's participation.

Ruff enjoyed a distinguished medical career in postwar Germany.
