= Doctors' Trial =

Post-World War II trial of German doctors for war crimes

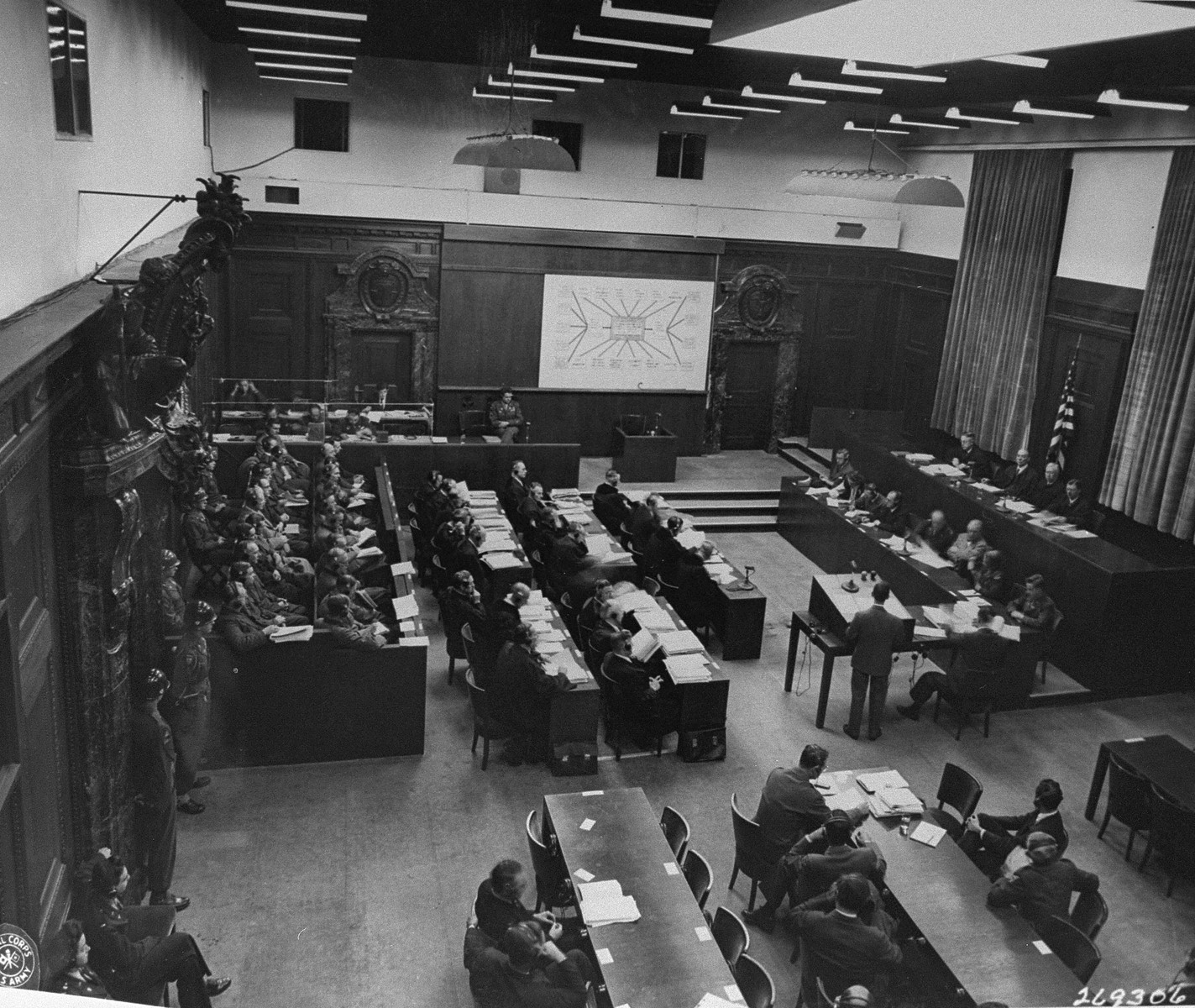
- Courtroom at the trial, 12 December 1946
- Court: Palace of Justice, Nuremberg
- Full case name: United States of America v. Karl Brandt et al.
- Started: 9 December 1946
- Decided: 20 August 1947

Court membership
- Judges sitting: Walter B. Beals (presiding); Harold L. Sebring; Johnson T. Crawford; Victor C. Swearingen (alternate)

United States of America v. Karl Brandt, et al., commonly known as the Doctors' Trial, was the first of the twelve "subsequent Nuremberg trials" for war crimes and crimes against humanity after the end of World War II in Europe, the trial taking place between 1946 and 1947. The accused were 20 physicians and 3 SS officials charged for their involvement in the Aktion T4 programme and Nazi human experimentation.

The Doctors' Trial was held by United States authorities at the Palace of Justice in Nuremberg in the American occupation zone before US military courts, not before the International Military Tribunal. Seven of the accused were sentenced to death by hanging, five were sentenced to life imprisonment, four were given prison sentences from 10 to 20 years, and seven were acquitted.

The judges, heard before Military Tribunal I, were Walter B. Beals (presiding judge) from Washington, Harold L. Sebring from Florida, and Johnson T. Crawford from Oklahoma, with Victor C. Swearingen, a former special assistant to the Attorney General of the United States, as an alternate judge. The Chief of Counsel for the Prosecution was Telford Taylor, and the chief prosecutor was James M. McHaney. The indictment was filed on 25 October 1946; the trial lasted from 9 December that year until 20 August 1947.

== Case ==
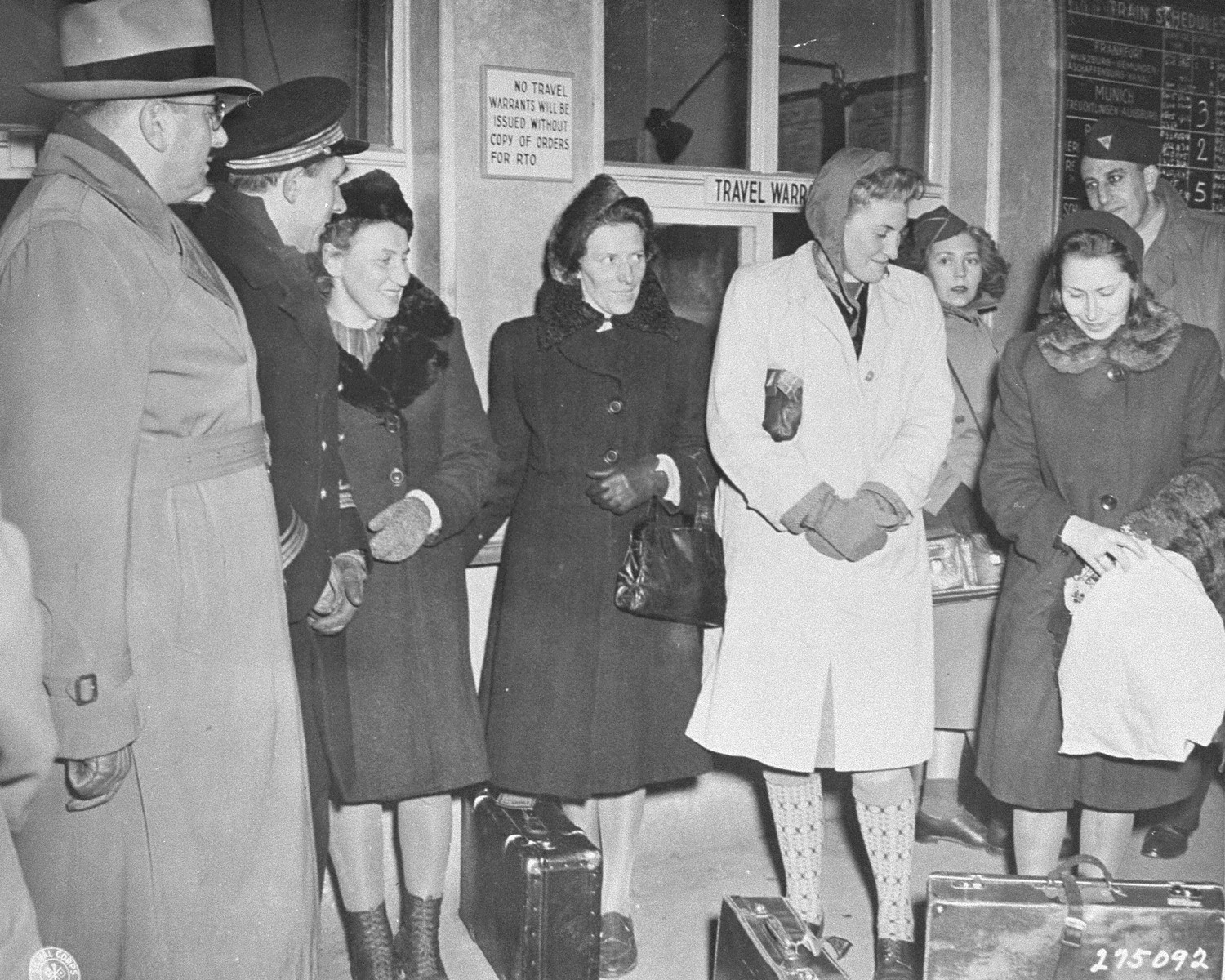
Witnesses at the Doctors' Trial.

Twenty of the defendants were physicians and three were SS officials (Viktor Brack, Rudolf Brandt, and Wolfram Sievers), all of whom were accused of being involved in Nazi human experimentation and the Aktion T4 programme of involuntary euthanasia. The physicians came from a variety of civilian and military backgrounds, and some were members of the SS. Other Nazi physicians such as Philipp Bouhler, Ernst-Robert Grawitz, Leonardo Conti, and Enno Lolling had died by suicide. Werner Heyde, a chief organiser of the T4 program, would not be captured until 1959, while Josef Mengele, one of the leading Nazi doctors, evaded capture altogether.

In his opening statement, Taylor summarized the crimes of the defendants.

"The defendants in this case are charged with murders, tortures, and other atrocities committed in the name of medical science. The victims of these crimes numbered in the hundreds of thousands. A handful only are still alive; a few of the survivors will appear in this courtroom. But most of these miserable victims were slaughtered outright or died in the course of the tortures to which they were subjected. For the most part, they are nameless, dead. To their murderers, these wretched people were not individuals at all. They came in wholesale lots and were treated worse than animals."

== Indictment ==
The accused faced four charges, including:

1. Conspiracy to commit war crimes and crimes against humanity as described in counts 2 and 3;
2. War crimes: performing medical experiments, without the subjects' consent, on prisoners of war and civilians of occupied countries, in the course of which experiments the defendants committed murders, brutalities, cruelties, tortures, atrocities, and other inhuman acts. Also planning and performing the mass murder of prisoners of war and civilians of occupied countries, stigmatized as aged, insane, incurably ill, deformed, and so on, by gas, lethal injections, and diverse other means in nursing homes, hospitals, and asylums during the Euthanasia Program and participating in the mass murder of concentration camp inmates.
3. Crimes against humanity: committing crimes described under count 2 also on German nationals.
4. Membership in a criminal organization, the SS.

The tribunal largely dropped count 1, stating that the charge was beyond its jurisdiction.

I — Indicted G — Indicted and found guilty

Defendants, functions, verdicts, and fates
Name	Photograph	Function	Charges				Sentence
Name	Photograph	Function	1	2	3	4	Sentence
Karl Brandt		Personal physician to Adolf Hitler; Gruppenführer in the SS and Generalleutnant (Lieutenant General) in the Waffen SS; Reich Commissioner for Health and Sanitation (Reichskommissar für Sanitäts und Gesundheitswesen); and member of the Reich Research Council (Reichsforschungsrat)	I	G	G	G	Death by hanging, executed 2 June 1948
Siegfried Handloser		Generaloberstabsarzt (Lieutenant General, Medical Service); Medical Inspector of the Army (Heeressanitätsinspekteur); and Chief of the Medical Services of the Armed Forces (Chef des Wehrmachtsanitätswesens)	I	G	G		Life imprisonment; commuted to 20 years; released/died 1954
Paul Rostock		Chief Surgeon of the Surgical Clinic in Berlin; Surgical Adviser to the Army; and Chief of the Office for Medical Science and Research (Amtschef der Dienststelle Medizinische Wissenschaft und Forschung) under the defendant Karl Brandt, Reich Commissioner for Health and Sanitation	I	I	I		Acquitted; died 1956
Oskar Schröder		Generaloberstabsarzt (Colonel General Medical Service); Chief of Staff of the Inspectorate of the Medical Service of the Luftwaffe (Chef des Stabes, Inspekteur des Luftwaffe-Sanitätswesens); and Chief of the Medical Service of the Luftwaffe (Chef des Sanitätswesens der Luftwaffe)	I	G	G		Life imprisonment; commuted to 15 years; released 1954; died 1959
Karl Genzken		Gruppenführer in the SS and Generalleutnant (Lieutenant General) in the Waffen SS; and Chief of the Medical Department of the Waffen SS (Chef des Sanitätsamts der Waffen SS)	I	G	G	G	Life imprisonment; commuted to 20 years; released April 1954; died 1957
Karl Gebhardt		Gruppenführer in the SS and Generalleutnant (Lieutenant General) in the Waffen SS; personal physician to Reichsfuehrer-SS Himmler; Chief Surgeon of the Staff of the Reich Physician SS and Police (Oberster Kliniker, Reichsarzt SS und Polizei); and President of the German Red Cross	I	G	G	G	Death by hanging, executed 2 June 1948
Kurt Blome		Deputy [of the] Reich Health Leader (Reichsgesundheitsführer); and Plenipotentiary for Cancer Research in the Reich Research Council	I	I	I		Acquitted; died 1969
Rudolf Brandt		Standartenführer (Colonel); in the Allgemeine SS; Personal Administrative Officer to Reichsführer-SS Himmler (Persönlicher Referent von Himmler); and Ministerial Counselor and Chief of the Ministerial Office in the Reich Ministry of the Interior	I	G	G	G	Death by hanging, executed 2 June 1948
Joachim Mrugowsky		Oberführer (Senior Colonel) in the Waffen SS; Chief Hygienist of the Reich Physician SS and Police (Oberster Hygieniker, Reichsarzt SS und Polizei); and Chief of the Hygienic Institute of the Waffen SS (Chef des Hygienischen Institutes der Waffen SS)	I	G	G	G	Death by hanging, executed 2 June 1948
Helmut Poppendick		Oberführer (Senior Colonel) in the SS; and Chief of the Personal Staff of the Reich Physician SS and Police (Chef des Persönlichen Stabes des Reichsarztes SS und Polizei)	I	I	I	G	10 years; released 1951; died 1994
Wolfram Sievers		Standartenführer (Colonel) in the SS; Reich Manager of the Ahnenerbe Society and Director of its Institute for Military Scientific Research (Institut für Wehrwissenschaftliche Zweckforschung); and Deputy Chairman of the Managing Board of Directors of the Reich Research Council	I	G	G	G	Death by hanging, executed 2 June 1948
Gerhard Rose		Generalarzt of the Luftwaffe (Major General, Medical Service of the Air Force); Vice President, Chief of the Department for Tropical Medicine, and Professor of the Robert Koch Institute; and Hygienic Adviser for Tropical Medicine to the Chief of the Medical Service of the Luftwaffe	I	G	G		Life imprisonment; commuted to 20 years; released 1955; died 1992
Siegfried Ruff		Director of the Department for Aviation Medicine at the German Experimental Institute for Aviation (Deutsche Versuchsanstalt für Luftfahrt) and First Lieutenant in the Medical Service of the Air Force; still researching and publishing in the field of aviation as late as 1989	I	I	I		Acquitted; died 1989
Hans-Wolfgang Romberg		Doctor on the Staff of the Department for Aviation Medicine at the German Experimental Institute for Aviation	I	I	I		Acquitted; died 1981
Georg August Weltz		Oberfeldarzt in the Luftwaffe (Lieutenant Colonel, Medical Service, of the Air Force); and Chief of the Institute for Aviation Medicine in Munich	I	I	I		Acquitted; died 1963
Viktor Brack		Oberführer (Senior Colonel) in the SS and Sturmbannführer (Major) in the Waffen SS; and Chief Administrative Officer in the Chancellery of the Führer of the NSDAP (Oberdienstleiter, Kanzlei des Führers der NSDAP)	I	G	G	G	Death by hanging, executed 2 June 1948
Hermann Becker-Freyseng		Stabsarzt in the Luftwaffe (Captain, Medical Service of the Air Force); and Chief of the Department for Aviation Medicine of the Chief of the Medical Service of the Luftwaffe	I	G	G		20 years; commuted to 10 years; released 1952; died 1961
Konrad Schäfer		Doctor on the Staff of the Institute for Aviation Medicine in Berlin	I	I	I		Acquitted; died after 1951
Waldemar Hoven		Hauptsturmführer (Captain) in the Waffen SS; and Chief Doctor of the Buchenwald concentration camp	I	G	G	G	Death by hanging, executed 2 June 1948
Wilhelm Beiglböck		Consulting Physician to the Luftwaffe	I	G	G		15 years; commuted to 10 years; released 15 December 1951; died 1963
Adolf Pokorny		Physician, Specialist in Skin and Venereal Diseases	I	I	I		Acquitted
Herta Oberheuser		Physician at the Ravensbrück concentration camp; and Assistant Physician to the defendant Gebhardt at the hospital at Hohenlychen	I	G	G		20 years; commuted to 10 years; released 1952; died 1978
Fritz Fischer		Sturmbannführer (Major) in the Waffen SS; and Assistant Physician to the defendant Gebhardt at the hospital at Hohenlychen	I	G	G	G	Life imprisonment; commuted to 15 years; released March 1954; died 2003

All of the criminals sentenced to death were hanged on 2 June 1948 at Landsberg Prison.

For some, the difference between receiving a prison term and the death sentence was membership in the SS, "an organization declared criminal by the judgement of the International Military Tribunal". However, some SS medical personnel received prison sentences. The degree of personal involvement and/or presiding over groups involved was a factor in others.

== See also ==
- Command responsibility
- Declaration of Geneva
- Declaration of Helsinki
- Euthanasia trials
- Medical ethics
- Medical torture
- Nazi eugenics
- Nuremberg Code
- Nuremberg principles
- Nuremberg trials
- Bruno Beger
- Hans Conrad Julius Reiter
- Claus Schilling
- Hermann Stieve
- List of medical ethics cases
