= Hochneukirchen-Gschaidt =

- Municipality
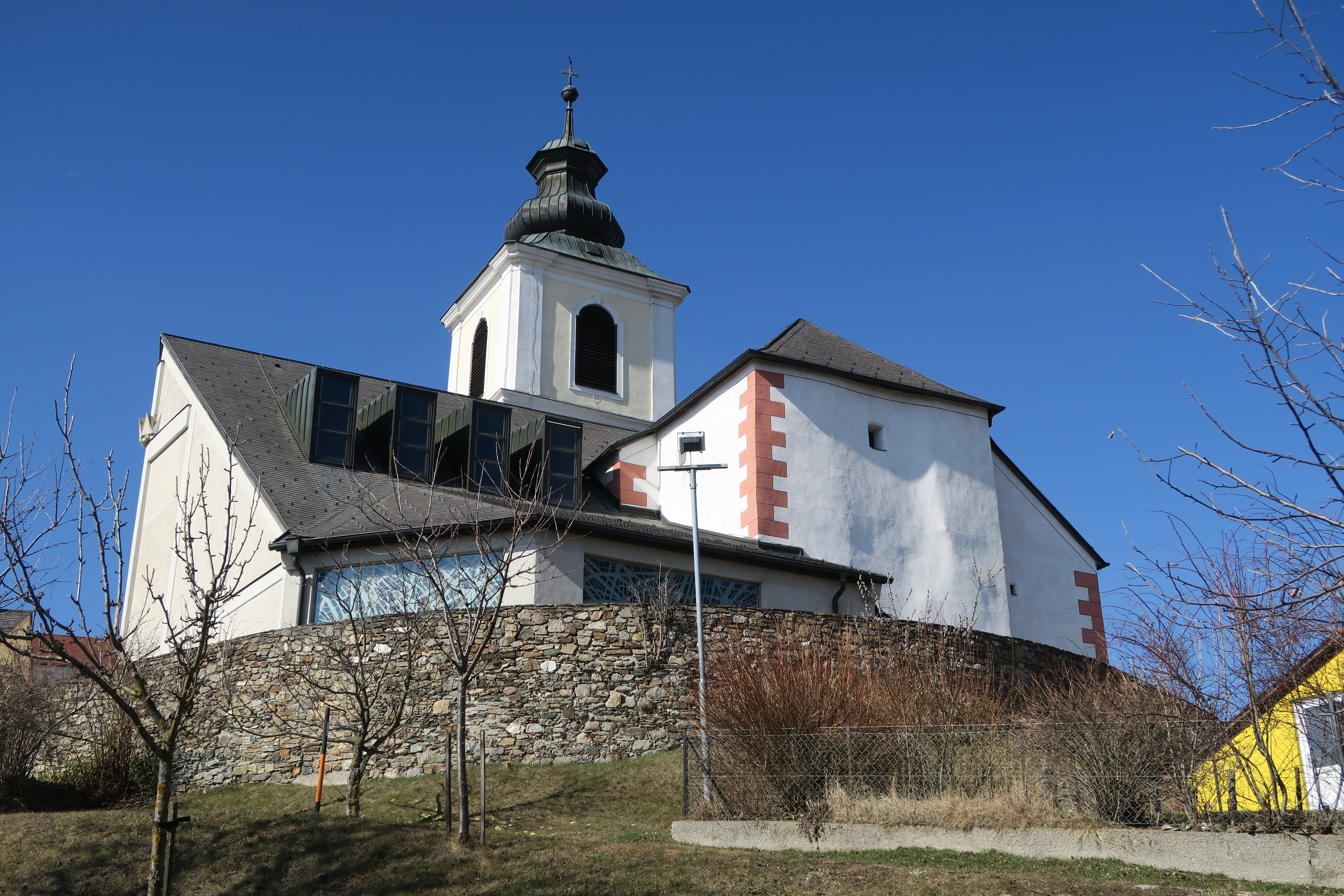
- Hochneukirchen parish church

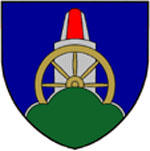
- Coat of arms

- Location within Austria Hochneukirchen-Gschaidt (Austria)
- Coordinates: 47°27′00″N 16°12′00″E
- Country: Austria
- State: Lower Austria
- District: Wiener Neustadt-Land

Government
  - Mayor: Friedrich Beiglböck (ÖVP)

Area
  - Total: 35.13 km^{2} (13.56 sq mi)
- Elevation: 769 m (2,523 ft)

Population (2018-01-01)
  - Total: 1,633
  - Density: 46.48/km^{2} (120.4/sq mi)
- Time zone: UTC+1 (CET)
  - Summer (DST): UTC+2 (CEST)
- Postal code: 2852
- Area code: 02648
- Vehicle registration: WB
- Website: www.hochneukirchen-gschaidt.at

Hochneukirchen-Gschaidt is an Austrian market town in the district of Wiener Neustadt-Land. The municipality was formed by merging the former municipalities of Hochneukirchen and Gschaidt.
