= Hans Schwerte =

German academic and Nazi (1909–1999)

Hans Ernst Schneider (15 December 1909 – 18 December 1999), was a German professor of literature under his alias Hans Schwerte. His real identity as a former SS officer was revealed in April 1995.

== Early life and Nazi years ==
Hans Ernst Schneider was born in Königsberg on 15 December 1909. He studied in Königsberg (1928), Berlin (1929), again in Königsberg (1930) and in Vienna (1932). In 1932 he joined the National Socialist German Students' League. In 1933 he did voluntary work with the Freiwilliger Arbeitsdienst (a precursor of the Reichsarbeitsdienst) in Jedwilleiten at the Neman River delta and joined the SA. In 1935 he received his doctorate from Königsberg University for an unpublished dissertation on Turgenev and German literature. He was examined by Paul Hankamer in literature, Wilhelm Worringer in art history, and Hans Heyse in philosophy.

From 1935 Schneider directed a department of the Nationalsozialistischer Reichsbund für Leibesübungen in Berlin. In 1936–1937 he made a career in the "folklore and homeland" department of the National Socialist Culture Community. Having joined the Nazi Party and switched membership from the SA to the SS in 1937, from 1938 he worked for the SS-Rasse- und Siedlungshauptamt and the Ahnenerbe. In 1940–1942 he worked for Hanns Albin Rauter, Higher SS and Police Leader in The Hague. In 1942 he had the rank of Hauptsturmführer, and as director of an Ahnenerbe department he was responsible for replacing the staff of universities in German-occupied Netherlands and Belgium with Nazis and collaborators. He was editor of Weltliteratur, an SS journal on world literature.

Schneider had an influential role in the Ahnenerbe and procured medical instruments from the Netherlands for lethal experiments conducted by Sigmund Rascher and Ernst Holzlöhner in the Dachau concentration camp. In 1945 Schneider fled from Berlin to Lübeck, where he used his contacts in the SD (intelligence service) to obtain a new identity as Hans Schwerte, born in Hildesheim on 3 October 1910.

== Post-war career ==
In 1946 Schneider, under his new identity as Hans Schwerte, located his wife and child. His wife had him declared dead under his old identity, and in 1947 the couple married again. Schwerte studied again, now at the University of Hamburg and the University of Erlangen, where he received his doctorate in 1948 for a dissertation about Rainer Maria Rilke's notion of time. His referees were Helmut Prang, Hans-Joachim Schoeps and his adviser Heinz Otto Burger. In 1958, he received his habilitation in recent history of German literature, for his celebrated work on Faustian ideology in Germany. From 1964, he was an extraordinary professor at the University of Erlangen, where he directed the theatre studies department of the seminar of German literature. In 1965, he moved to Aachen, where he became professor of contemporary German literature at RWTH Aachen University. Schwerte was not the only member of Heinrich Himmler's Ahnenerbe at Erlangen University. In 1958 Rudolf Till became professor of classical studies there who also had worked in Himmler's Ahnenerbe. Both men must have known. Rudolf Till had lost his position as professor of Latin and Greek at the Ludwig-Maximilians-Universität München in 1945 and taught at private secondary schools until 1958 when he was made professor of Latin and Greek at Erlangen university. Till died in 1979 without his Nazi past and SS rank becoming known.

From 1970 to 1973, Schwerte was rector of RWTH Aachen University. As such he had a social liberal reputation and unusually good relations with the left-wing German student movement. Already at Erlangen university Schwerte expressed his sympathy with the anti-fascist student movement that sprung up in 1967 after the assassination of Berlin student Benno Ohnesorg by a West Berlin policeman who was an informer of the East German Stasi. From 1976 to 1981 Schwerte was commissioner for the relations between the universities of North Rhine-Westphalia and those of the Netherlands and of Belgium. He retired in 1978, and in 1983 he received the Federal Cross of Merit for his commitment to academic relations with the two neighbouring countries.

Although there is no definitive proof, it is generally believed that Schwerte's past was known to his teachers and colleagues, and in particular to his doctoral adviser Heinz Otto Burger and his colleague in Aachen Arnold Gehlen (who both also had a Nazi past). It is documented that in 1985 a librarian in Aachen who had discovered Schwerte's previous life agreed with the university administration to keep it secret.

== Public discovery ==
Rumours about Schwerte's Nazi past condensed in 1992. After accidental discovery of Schneider's past, his American colleague Earl Jeffrey Richards notified the Simon Wiesenthal Center. The rumours inspired students to further research in 1994, which led to the determination that no Hans Schwerte was born in Hildesheim in 1910. Meanwhile, Dutch television was preparing a report about Schwerte's secret identity.

Under pressure, Schwerte went public in April 1995, one day before the Dutch television programme Brandpunt uncovered him. In the resulting scandal, Schwerte lost the Federal Cross of Merit, his title as professor, his habilitation and his pension. Moreover, the 86-year-old was ruined when the state asked him to return his lifetime salary.

The prosecution investigated Schneider's role in the Nazi-occupied Netherlands, and especially his procurement of medical devices. However, as there was no proof that he knew about their intended use, the investigations were soon discontinued. Schwerte himself commented: "I do not know who Schneider is, but I will have to take responsibility for him." He died in Marquartstein on 18 December 1999, three days after his 90th birthday.

The case was widely discussed in Germany and became the subject of several books. Commentators were generally intrigued by the close parallels between Schneider/Schwerte's two lives, and wondered whether Schwerte had become a genuine antifascist in the 1960s or had merely taken the dissimulation to extremes, and what exactly it was that took him to the locations of his Nazi past. In spite of its unusual features the case is often regarded as symptomatic for the way in which West German universities dealt with the past, given the incomplete nature of denazification and the general continuity in their staff.
