= Robert Berger =

Robert Berger may refer to:

- Robert Berger (producer) (born 1934), American film producer
- Robert Berger (mathematician) (born 1938), American mathematician
- Robert Berger (officer) (1914–1982), German officer and Knight's Cross recipient
- Robert Berger (footballer) (born 1996), German footballer
- Robert Berger (surgeon) (1929–2016), Hungarian-American surgeon
