= Nazi human experimentation =

Series of human experiments in Nazi Germany

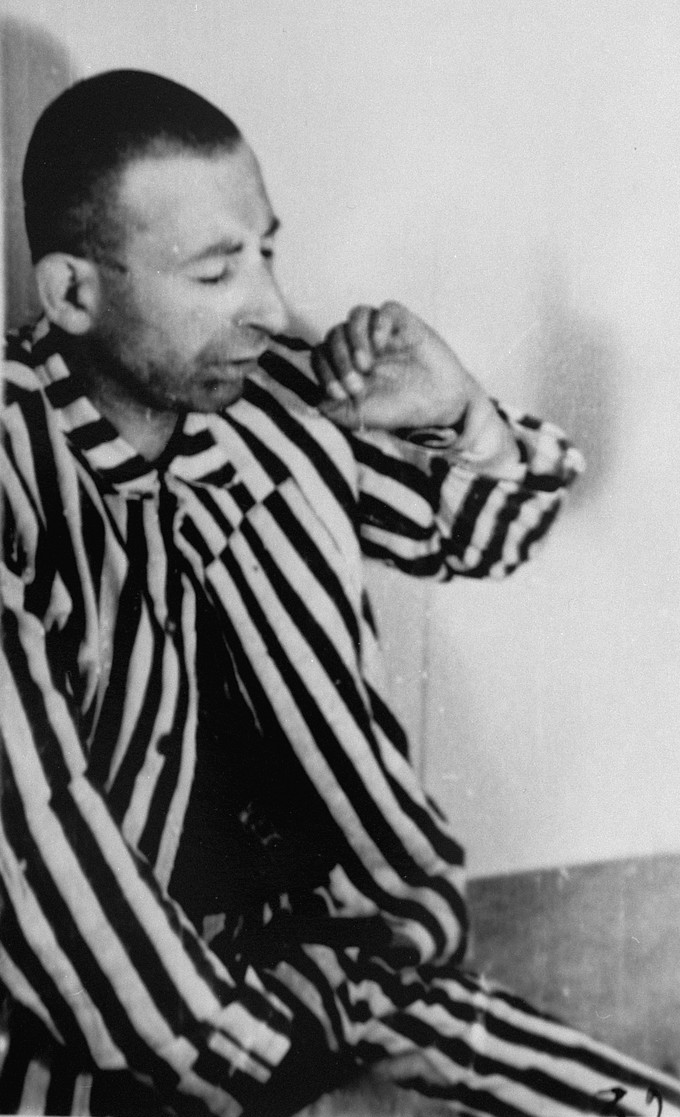
"A Jewish prisoner in a special chamber responds to changing air pressure during high-altitude experiments. For the benefit of the Luftwaffe, conditions simulating those found at 15,000 meters [49,000 ft] in altitude were created in an effort to determine if German pilots might survive at that height."

Nazi Germany conducted medical experiments on prisoners in its concentration camps mainly between 1942 and 1945. There were 15,754 documented victims, of various nationalities and ages, although the true number is believed to be more. About a quarter of documented victims were killed and survivors generally experienced severe permanent injuries.

At Auschwitz and other camps, under the direction of Eduard Wirths, selected inmates were subjected to various experiments that were designed to help German military personnel in combat situations, develop new weapons, aid in the recovery of military personnel who had been injured, and to advance Nazi racial ideology and eugenics, including the twin experiments of Josef Mengele. Aribert Heim conducted similar medical experiments at Mauthausen.

After the war, these crimes were tried at what became known as the Doctors' Trial, and revulsion at the abuses led to the development of the Nuremberg Code of medical ethics. Some Nazi physicians in the Doctors' Trial argued that military necessity justified their experiments, or compared their victims to collateral damage from Allied bombings.

== Experiments ==
The table of contents of a document from the subsequent Nuremberg trials prosecution includes titles of the sections that document medical experiments revolving around food, seawater, epidemic jaundice, sulfanilamide, blood coagulation and phlegmon. According to the indictments at the subsequent Nuremberg Trials, these experiments included the following:

=== Blood coagulation experiments ===
Sigmund Rascher experimented with the effects of Polygal, a substance made from beet and apple pectin, which aided blood clotting. He predicted that the preventive use of Polygal tablets would reduce bleeding from surgery or gunshot wounds sustained during combat. Subjects were given a Polygal tablet, shot through the neck or chest, or had their limbs amputated without anesthesia. Rascher published an article on his experience of using Polygal, without detailing the nature of the human trials, and set up a company staffed by prisoners to manufacture the substance.

Bruno Weber was the head of the Hygienic Institution at Block 10 in Auschwitz and injected his subjects with blood types that differed from their own. This caused the blood cells to congeal, and the blood was studied. When the Nazis removed blood from someone, they often entered a major artery, causing the subject to die of major blood loss.

=== Bone, muscle, and nerve transplantation experiments ===
From about September 1942 to about December 1943, experiments were conducted at the Ravensbrück concentration camp for the benefit of the German Armed Forces, to study bone, muscle, and nerve regeneration, and bone transplantation from one person to another. In these experiments, subjects had their bones, muscles and nerves removed without anesthesia. As a result of these operations, many victims suffered intense agony, mutilation, and permanent disability.

On 12 August 1946, a survivor named Jadwiga Kamińska gave a deposition about her time at Ravensbrück concentration camp, describing how she was operated on twice. Both operations involved one of her legs and although she never describes herself as having any knowledge as to what exactly the procedure was, she explained that both times she was in extreme pain and developed a fever post-surgery but was given little to no aftercare. Kamińska describes being told that she had been operated on simply because she was a "young girl and a Polish patriot". She describes how her leg oozed pus for months after the operations.

Prisoners were also experimented on by having their bone marrow injected with bacteria to study the effectiveness of new drugs being developed for use in the battlefields. Those who survived remained permanently disfigured.

=== Freezing experiments ===
A cold water immersion experiment at Dachau concentration camp presided over by Ernst Holzlöhner (left) and Sigmund Rascher (right). The subject is wearing an experimental Luftwaffe garment.

In 1941, the Luftwaffe conducted experiments with the intent of discovering means to prevent and treat hypothermia. There were 360 to 400 experiments and 280 to 300 victims, indicating that some victims suffered more than one experiment.

"Exitus" (death) table compiled by Sigmund Rascher
Attempt no.	Water temperature	Body temperature when removed from the water	Body temperature at death	Time in water	Time of death
5	5.2 °C (41.4 °F)	27.7 °C (81.9 °F)	27.7 °C (81.9 °F)	66'	66'
13	6 °C (43 °F)	29.2 °C (84.6 °F)	29.2 °C (84.6 °F)	80'	87'
14	4 °C (39 °F)	27.8 °C (82.0 °F)	27.5 °C (81.5 °F)	95'	
16	4 °C (39 °F)	28.7 °C (83.7 °F)	26 °C (79 °F)	60'	74'
23	4.5 °C (40.1 °F)	27.8 °C (82.0 °F)	25.7 °C (78.3 °F)	57'	65'
25	4.6 °C (40.3 °F)	27.8 °C (82.0 °F)	26.6 °C (79.9 °F)	51'	65'
	4.2 °C (39.6 °F)	26.7 °C (80.1 °F)	25.9 °C (78.6 °F)	53'	53'

Another study placed prisoners naked in the open air for several hours with temperatures as low as −6 °C (21 °F). Besides studying the physical effects of cold exposure, the experimenters also assessed different methods of rewarming survivors. "One assistant later testified that some victims were thrown into boiling water for rewarming."

Beginning in August 1942, at the Dachau camp, prisoners were forced to sit in tanks of freezing water for up to three hours. After subjects were frozen, they then underwent different methods for rewarming. Many subjects died in this process. Others were also forced to stand naked outside in below freezing temperatures, with many screaming in pain as their bodies froze. In a letter from 10 September 1942, Rascher describes an experiment on intense cooling performed in Dachau where people were dressed in fighter pilot uniforms and submerged in freezing water. Rascher had some of the victims completely underwater and others only submerged up to the head.

The freezing and hypothermia experiments were conducted for the Nazi high command to simulate the conditions the armies suffered on the Eastern Front, as the German forces were ill-prepared for the cold weather they encountered. Many experiments were conducted on captured Soviet troops; the Nazis wondered whether their genetics gave them superior resistance to cold. The principal locales were Dachau and Auschwitz. Sigmund Rascher, an SS doctor based at Dachau, reported directly to Reichsführer-SS Heinrich Himmler and publicised the results of his freezing experiments at the 1942 medical conference entitled "Medical Problems Arising from Sea and Winter". Himmler suggested that the victims could be warmed by forcing them to engage in sexual contact with other victims. An example included how a hypothermic victim was placed between two naked Romani women.

=== High altitude experiments ===
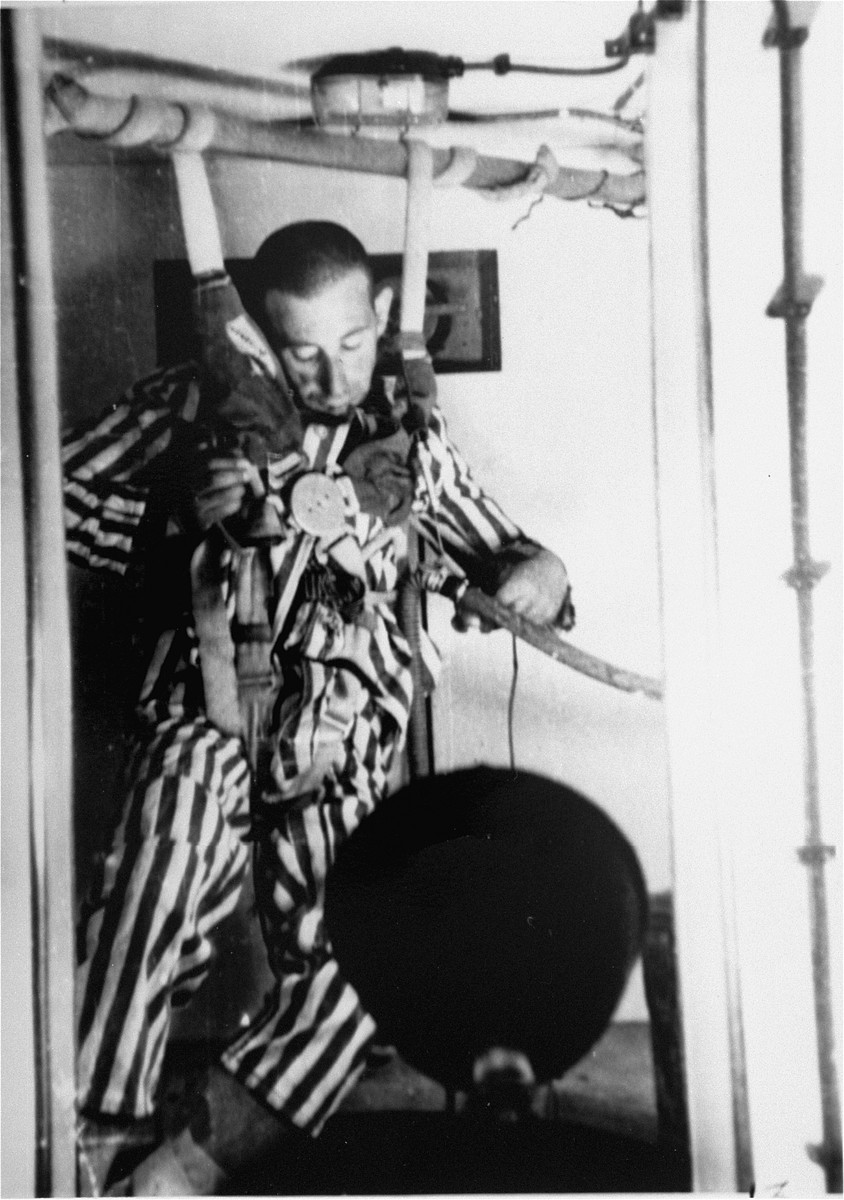
A victim loses consciousness during a depressurization experiment at Dachau by Luftwaffe doctor Sigmund Rascher, 1942.

In early 1942, prisoners at Dachau concentration camp were used by Sigmund Rascher in experiments to aid German pilots who had to eject at high altitudes. A low-pressure chamber containing these prisoners was used to simulate conditions at altitudes of up to 68,000 feet (21,000 m). It was rumored that Rascher performed vivisections on the brains of victims who survived the initial experiment. Of the 200 subjects, 80 died outright, and the others were murdered. In a letter from 5 April 1942 to Heinrich Himmler, Rascher explained the results of a low-pressure experiment that was performed on people at Dachau Concentration camp in which the victim was suffocated while Rascher and another unnamed doctor took note of his reactions. The person was described as 37 years old and in good health before being murdered. Rascher described the victim's actions as he began to lose oxygen and timed the changes in behavior. The 37-year-old began to wiggle his head at four minutes; a minute later Rascher observed that he was suffering from cramps before falling unconscious. He describes how the victim then lay unconscious, breathing only three times per minute, until he stopped breathing 30 minutes after being deprived of oxygen. The victim then turned blue and began foaming at the mouth. An autopsy followed an hour later.

In a letter to Rascher on 13 April 1942, Himmler ordered Rascher to continue the high altitude experiments and to continue experimenting on prisoners condemned to death. He also ordered specific tests to "determine whether these men could be recalled to life". If someone condemned to death was successfully resuscitated, Himmler stated he should be "pardoned to concentration camp for life".

=== Sterilization and fertility experiments ===
From about March 1941 to about January 1945, sterilization experiments were conducted at Auschwitz, Ravensbrück, and other places. The purpose of these experiments was to develop a method of sterilization which would be suitable for sterilizing millions of people with a minimum of time and effort. The targets for sterilization included Jewish and Roma populations. These experiments were conducted by means of X-ray, surgery and various drugs. Thousands of victims were sterilized. Sterilization was not limited to these experiments, with the Nazi government already sterilizing 400,000 people as part of its compulsory sterilization program.

One prominent scientist in this domain was Carl Clauberg, who initially X-rayed women to make sure that there was no obstruction to their ovaries. Over the next three to five sessions, he injected caustic substances into their uteruses without anesthetics. Many died, others suffered permanent injuries and infections, and about 700 were successfully sterilized. The women who stood against him and his experiments or were deemed as unfit test subjects were sent to the gas chambers.

Intravenous injections of solutions speculated to contain iodine and silver nitrate were similarly successful but had unwanted side effects such as vaginal bleeding, severe abdominal pain, and cervical cancer. Those who developed cancer were vivisected, with their cervixes and wombs removed. Therefore, radiation treatment became the favored choice of sterilization. Specific amounts of exposure to radiation destroyed a person's ability to produce ova or sperm, sometimes administered through deception. Many suffered severe radiation burns.

The Nazis also implemented X-ray radiation treatment in their search for mass sterilization. They gave the women abdomen X-rays, men received them on their genitalia, for abnormal periods of time in attempt to invoke infertility. After the experiment was complete, they surgically removed their reproductive organs, without anesthesia, for lab analysis.

M.D. William E. Seidelman, a professor from the University of Toronto, in collaboration with Dr. Howard Israel of Columbia University, published a report on an investigation on the medical experimentation performed in Austria under the Nazi regime. In that report, he mentions a Doctor Hermann Stieve, who used the war to experiment on live humans. Stieve specifically focused on the reproductive system of women, and was known to use the organs of executed criminals for his studies. While Seidelman said it "appear[ed] to be incorrect", other sources say that he would tell women set to be executed by the Gestapo their date of death in advance, and he would evaluate how their psychological distress would affect their menstruation cycles. Allegedly, some of the women were raped after they were told the date when they would be killed so that Stieve could study the path of sperm through their reproductive system. However, this has been called into question, as there is no evidence that Stieve ever studied sperm migration, a subject not mentioned in his papers.

=== Twin research ===
In 1944 doctor Josef Mengele, who was trained in genetics and anthropology, conducted a large twin study at Auschwitz. According to Paul Weindling, records show that 582 twins were gathered by Mengele for research purposes. Mengele's interest in twins has been a subject of speculation, with some suggesting he was trying to increase the German birthrate. However, Marwell argues his interest was rooted in the established tradition of twin studies used to assess heritability of traits. Comparative twin studies were used throughout Nazi Germany for genetic research, and were conducted by Mengele's academic mentor Otmar van Verschuer in the German population. Mengele also commented that he was researching formation of the human body.

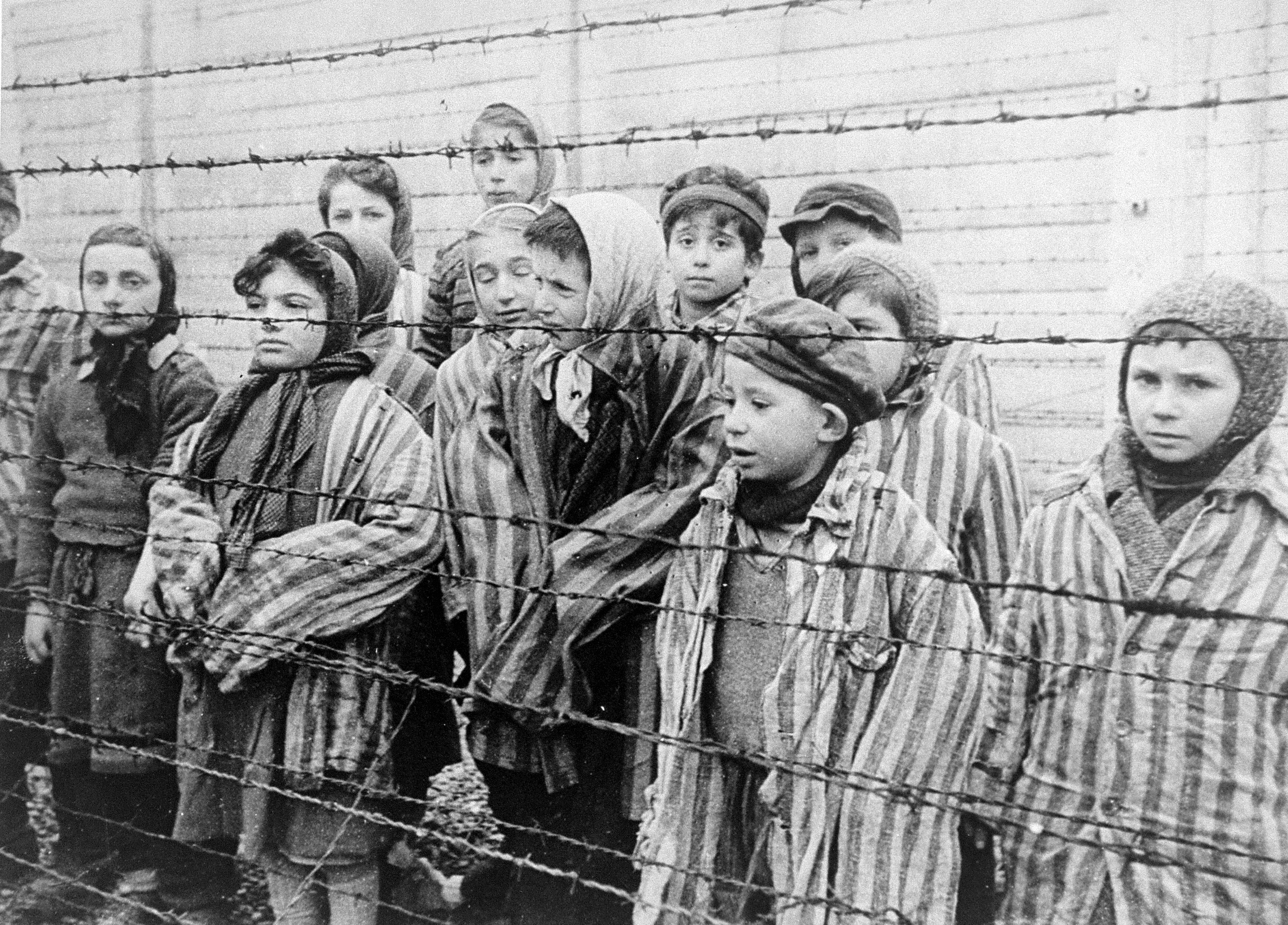
Jewish children kept alive in Auschwitz for use in Mengele's research, liberated in January 1945.

Twins in Mengele's research were not required to do forced labour, but were subject to regular lengthy examinations. Mengele employed educated anthropologist prisoners to collect data, who used precision instruments to measure limbs and head size, collect dental impressions, and record other anthropological details such as eye colour, hair color and texture. Blood was regularly taken for analysis. One prisoner anthropologist described the detail of Mengele's twin examinations as "excessive", but she considered it "more or less standard for the time, the norm for anthropological work".

Some witnesses describe Mengele killing some of the twins; Miklós Nyiszli testified to conducting autopsies of several twins killed by lethal injection, and another witness estimated that 100 were killed for research purposes. In contrast, an inmate anthropologist maintained that Mengele did not kill any of the twins she measured, and the 'twins father' (prison leader) said he was not aware of any being killed. An often cited figure of 200 surviving twins is derived from the Soviet headcount at liberation; however this number excludes older twins who were sent on marches to other camps before liberation. Weindling states this has resulted in an "exaggerated estimate of Mengele’s scientifically motivated killing of twins".

In October 1944, Mengele intervened to stop the order of a rival SS doctor Heinz Thilo, who had selected as many as half of the twins to be killed. Mengele's twin research ended in December 1944 when he fled Auschwitz, and he gave no order for the twins to be killed, allowing them to live out the war for unknown reasons. Historian David G. Marwell has raised caution regarding the veracity of several rumours, such as the allegation that Mengele sewed twins together to create siamese twins, or conducted other grotesque surgeries. Weindling states that a number of "reproductive, surgical and pharmacological experiments" have been misattributed to Mengele, but were actually conducted by other doctors.

=== Sulfonamide experiments ===
From about July 1942 to about September 1943, experiments to investigate the effectiveness of sulfonamide, a synthetic antimicrobial agent, were conducted at Ravensbrück. Wounds inflicted on the subjects were infected with bacteria such as Streptococcus, Clostridium perfringens (a major causative agent in gas gangrene) and Clostridium tetani, the causative agent in tetanus. Circulation of blood was interrupted by tying off blood vessels at both ends of the wound to create a condition similar to that of a battlefield wound. Researchers also aggravated the subjects' infection by forcing wood shavings and ground glass into their wounds. The infection was treated with sulfonamide and other drugs to determine their effectiveness.

=== Experiments on homosexuals ===
The Danish endocrinologist Carl Vaernet developed an artificial male sex gland, a capsule that slowly released testosterone when implanted under the skin. In 1944, Vaernet proposed to deputy Reich SS Physician Ernst-Robert Grawitz that the capsule could convert homosexual men into heterosexuals. At Buchenwald concentration camp, with encouragement of Heinrich Himmler and the support of camp doctor Gerhard Schiedlausky, Vaernet implanted capsules in at least ten homosexual prisoners. Vaernet claimed that "successes" with the implants occurred, presumably due to positive reports from prisoners hoping to receive a release from the camp, or knowing it would increase their odds of survival.

According to notes written by the senior doctor at Buchenwald dated 3 January 1945, at least one man died during the experiment in December 1944 "of heart failure associated with infectious enteritis and general bodily weakness". Eugen Kogon reported that a second man died as a result of the operations due to festering inflammation of cell tissue, presumably after 3 January 1945. Little is known about the fate of the other victims; none are known to have applied for financial compensation after 1945. The hypothesis that circulating hormones determined or cured homosexuality was discredited by later scientific research, and hormonal exposure prior to birth became a far more influential hypothesis.

Castration of homosexual men was also commonly performed in Nazi Germany. This began with "voluntary" castrations, but was later performed in concentration camps and prisons. It was believed castration, which reduces male sex drive, would prevent men from being "infected" with homosexuality by gay men. This idea was most influential in Nazi beliefs about homosexuality, rather than biological (genetic or prenatal environmental) theories of homosexuality.

Homosexual and Jewish prisoners were also given experimental treatments for typhus at Buchenwald, for phosphorus burns at Sachsenhausen, and were used for testing opiates and Pervitin.

=== Seawater experiments ===
From about July 1944 to about September 1944, experiments were conducted at the Dachau concentration camp to study various methods of making seawater drinkable. These victims were subject to deprivation of all food and only given the filtered seawater. At one point, a group of roughly 90 Roma were deprived of food and given nothing but seawater to drink by Hans Eppinger, leaving them gravely injured. They were so dehydrated that others observed them licking freshly mopped floors in an attempt to get drinkable water.

A Holocaust survivor named Joseph Tschofenig wrote a statement on these seawater experiments at Dachau. Tschofenig explained how while working at the medical experimentation stations he gained insight into some of the experiments that were performed on prisoners, namely those in which they were forced to drink salt water. Tschofenig also described how victims of the experiments had trouble eating and would desperately seek out any source of water, including old floor rags. Tschofenig was responsible for using the X-ray machine in the infirmary and describes how, even though he had insight into what was going on, he was powerless to stop it. He gives the example of a patient in the infirmary who was sent to the gas chambers by Sigmund Rascher simply because he witnessed one of the low-pressure experiments.

=== Other experiments ===
Child victims of Nazi experimentation show incisions where axillary lymph nodes had been surgically removed after they were deliberately infected with tuberculosis at Neuengamme concentration camp. They were later murdered.

In mid-1942 in Baranowicze, occupied Poland, head injury experiments were conducted in a small building behind the private home occupied by a known Nazi SD Security Service officer, in which "a young boy of eleven or twelve [was] strapped to a chair so he could not move. Above him was a mechanized hammer that every few seconds came down upon his head." The boy was driven insane from the torture. Inmates were also subjected to various diseases which were given in the form of injections. At the German concentration camps of Sachsenhausen, Dachau, Natzweiler, Buchenwald, and Neuengamme, scientists tested immunization compounds and serums for the prevention and treatment of contagious diseases, including malaria, typhus, tuberculosis, typhoid fever, yellow fever, and infectious hepatitis.

From about February 1942 to about April 1945, malaria experiments were performed on over 1,200 inmates in Dachau concentration camp. Healthy inmates had their hands and arms confined in cages filled with malaria mosquitoes. Upon contracting the disease, they were treated with synthetic drugs, at doses ranging from high to lethal. More than half died as a result. Other inmates were left with permanent disabilities. In an affidavit, presented at the Doctors' Trial, Oswald Pohl called the Dachau malaria experiments the "largest experiment" and reported it as the cause for his protest to Heinrich Himmler against such experiments because "Schilling continually asked for prisoners." From June 1943 until January 1945 at the concentration camps, Sachsenhausen and Natzweiler, experimentation with 'epidemic jaundice' (i.e. viral hepatitis) was conducted. Test subjects were injected with the disease in order to discover new inoculations for the condition. These tests were conducted for the benefit of the German Armed Forces. Most died in the experiments, whilst others survived, experiencing great pain and suffering.

Somewhere between December 1943 and October 1944, experiments were conducted at Buchenwald to investigate the effect of various poisons. The poisons were secretly administered to experimental subjects in their food. The victims died as a result of the poison or were killed immediately in order to permit autopsies. In September 1944, experimental subjects were shot with poisonous bullets, suffered torture, and often died. Some male Jewish prisoners had poisonous substances scrubbed or injected into their skin, causing boils filled with black fluid to form. These experiments were heavily documented as well as photographed by the Nazis.

At various times between September 1939 and April 1945, many experiments were conducted at Sachsenhausen, Natzweiler, and other camps to investigate the most effective treatment of wounds caused by mustard gas. Test subjects were deliberately exposed to mustard gas and other vesicants (e.g. Lewisite), which inflicted severe chemical burns. The victims' wounds were then tested to find the most effective treatment for the mustard gas burns. From around November 1943 to around January 1944, experiments were conducted at Buchenwald to test the effect of various pharmaceutical preparations on phosphorus burns. These burns were inflicted on prisoners using phosphorus material extracted from incendiary bombs. Some female prisoners of Block 10 were also subject to electroshock therapy. These women were often sick and underwent this experimentation before being sent to the gas chambers and killed.

== Aftermath ==
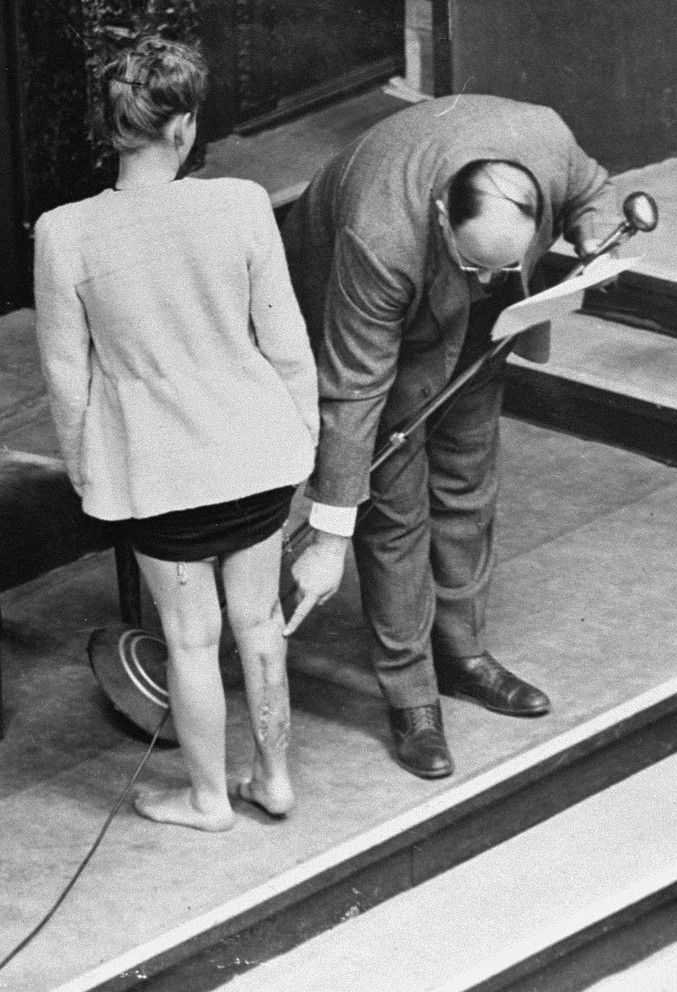
Jadwiga Dzido shows scars on her leg from medical experiments to the Doctors' Trial.

Other documented transcriptions from Heinrich Himmler include phrases such as "These researches… can be performed by us with particular efficiency because I personally assumed the responsibility for supplying asocial individuals and criminals who deserve only to die from concentration camps for these experiments." Many of the subjects died as a result of the experiments conducted by the Nazis, while many others were murdered after the tests were completed to study the effects post mortem. Those who survived were often left mutilated, with permanent disability, weakened bodies, and mental distress. On 19 August 1947, the doctors captured by Allied forces were put on trial in USA vs. Karl Brandt et al., commonly known as the Doctors' Trial. At the trial, several of the doctors argued in their defense that there was no international law regarding medical experimentation.

The issue of informed consent had previously been controversial in German medicine in 1900, when Albert Neisser infected patients (mainly prostitutes) with syphilis without their consent. Despite Neisser's support from most of the academic community, public opinion, led by psychiatrist Albert Moll, was against Neisser. While Neisser went on to be fined by the Royal Disciplinary Court, Moll developed "a legally based, positivistic contract theory of the patient-doctor relationship" that was not adopted into German law. Eventually, the minister for religious, educational, and medical affairs issued a directive stating that medical interventions other than for diagnosis, healing, and immunization were excluded under all circumstances if "the human subject was a minor or not competent for other reasons", or if the subject had not given his or her "unambiguous consent" after a "proper explanation of the possible negative consequences" of the intervention, though this was not legally binding.

In response, Drs. Leo Alexander and Andrew Conway Ivy, the American Medical Association representatives at the Doctors' Trial, drafted a ten-point memorandum entitled Permissible Medical Experiment that went on to be known as the Nuremberg Code. The code calls for such standards as voluntary consent of patients, avoidance of unnecessary pain and suffering, and that there must be a belief that the experimentation will not end in death or disability. The Code was not cited in any of the findings against the defendants and never made it into either German or American medical law. This code comes from the Nuremberg Trials where the most heinous of Nazi leaders were put on trial for their war crimes.

=== Modern ethical issues ===
Andrew Conway Ivy stated the Nazi experiments were of no medical value. Data obtained from the experiments, however, has been used and considered for use in multiple fields, often causing controversy. Some object to the data's use purely on ethical grounds, disagreeing with the methods used to obtain it, while others have rejected the research only on scientific grounds, criticizing methodological inconsistencies. Those in favor of using the data argue that if it has practical value to save lives, it would be equally unethical not to use it. Arnold S. Relman, editor of The New England Journal of Medicine from 1977 until 1991, refused to allow the journal to publish any article that cited the Nazi experiments.

"I don't want to have to use the Nazi data, but there is no other and will be no other in an ethical world ... not to use it would be equally bad. I'm trying to make something constructive out of it."

— Dr John Hayward, justifying citing the Dachau freezing experiments in his research.

The results of the Dachau freezing experiments have been used in some late 20th-century research into the treatment of hypothermia; at least 45 publications had referenced the experiments as of 1984, though the majority of publications in the field did not cite the research. Those who have argued in favor of using the research include Robert Pozos from the University of Minnesota and John Hayward from the University of Victoria. In a 1990 review of the Dachau experiments, Robert Berger concludes that the study has "all the ingredients of a scientific fraud" and that the data "cannot advance science or save human lives."

In 1989, the United States Environmental Protection Agency (EPA) considered using data from Nazi research into the effects of phosgene gas, believing the data could help US soldiers stationed in the Persian Gulf at the time. They eventually decided against using it, on the grounds it would lead to criticism and similar data could be obtained from later studies on animals. Writing for Jewish Law, Baruch Cohen concluded that the EPA's "knee-jerk reaction" to reject the data's use was "typical, but unprofessional", arguing that it could have saved lives.

== See also ==
Nazi related

- List of Nazi doctors who conducted human experiments
- Bullenhuser Damm
- Jewish skull collection
- List of medical eponyms with Nazi associations
- Nazi eugenics

Worldwide

- Guatemala syphilis experiments
- Human radiation experiments
- Japanese human experimentation

- Epidemic Prevention and Water Purification Department

- Human experimentation in North Korea
- Unethical human experimentation in the United States

- Project MKUltra (CIA)

== Sources ==
- Lifton, Robert Jay (1986). The Nazi Doctors: Medical Killing and the Psychology of Genocide. Basic Books. ISBN 978-0-465-04904-2. OCLC 13334966.
- Marwell, David G. (2020). Mengele: Unmasking the "Angel of Death". New York: W. W. Norton & Company. ISBN 978-0-393-60953-0.
