= Hans Münch =

German physician (1911–2001)

Hans Wilhelm Münch
- Hans Münch in detention, Kraków
- Born: 14 May 1911; Freiburg im Breisgau, Grand Duchy of Baden, German Empire
- Died: 6 December 2001 (aged 90); Füssen, Bavaria, Germany
- Education: University of Tübingen; Ludwig-Maximilians-Universität München
- Military career
- Allegiance: Nazi Germany
- Branch: Waffen-SS
- Service years: 1937–1945
- Rank: Untersturmführer

Hans Wilhelm Münch (14 May 1911 – 6 December 2001), also known as The Good Man of Auschwitz, was a German Nazi Party member who worked as an SS physician during World War II at the Auschwitz concentration camp from 1943 to 1945 in German occupied Poland. He was acquitted of war crimes at a 1947 trial in Kraków.

Münch was nicknamed The Good Man of Auschwitz for his refusal to assist in the mass murders there. He developed many elaborate ruses to keep inmates alive. He was the only person acquitted of war crimes at the 1947 Auschwitz trial in Kraków, where many inmates testified in his favour. After the war and the trial, he returned to Germany and worked as a practicing physician in Roßhaupten in Bavaria. While suffering from Alzheimer's at an old age, he made several public remarks that appeared to support Nazi ideology, and was tried for inciting racial hatred and similar charges. Münch was never sentenced, as all courts ruled that he was not of sound mind. He died in 2001.

== Career ==
After graduating from a gymnasium, Hans Münch studied medicine at the University of Tübingen and the Ludwig-Maximilians-Universität München. He was active in the political section of the Reichsstudentenführung (Reich's leadership of university students). In 1934, he joined the NSDStB.—Nationalsozialistischer Deutscher Studentenbund (National Socialist German Students' League)—and the NSKK—Nationalsozialistisches Kraftfahrerkorps (National Socialist Motor Corps). In May 1937, he joined the NSDAP. In 1939, he received a doctorate, and in the same year, married another physician.

When World War II began, he replaced country doctors in their practices in the Bavarian countryside as they had been inducted into the army; Münch's attempt to enlist in the Wehrmacht was rejected as his work as a doctor was considered too important.

=== Auschwitz ===
In June 1943, he was recruited as a scientist by the Waffen-SS and was sent to the Hygiene Institute of the Waffen-SS in Raisko, about 4 km (2.5 mi) from the main camp at Auschwitz. Münch worked alongside the infamous Josef Mengele, who was the same age and also came from Bavaria. Münch continued the bacteriological research he was known for before the war, as well as making occasional inspections of the camps and the prisoners.

Along with other doctors, Münch was expected to participate in the "selections" at the camp of Auschwitz-Birkenau, to decide who among the incoming Polish and Jewish men, women and children could work, who would be experimented on, and who would be murdered in the gas chambers. He found this abhorrent and refused to take part; this was confirmed by witnesses' testimony at his trial. The book on SS physicians of Auschwitz by Robert Jay Lifton (1986) mentions Münch as the only physician whose commitment to the Hippocratic oath proved stronger than that to the SS.

While Münch did conduct human experiments, these were often elaborate farces intended to protect inmates, as experiment subjects who were no longer useful were usually killed. According to testimony from inmate Dr. Louis Micheels, Münch's last act before the camp was abandoned was to provide him with a revolver to assist his escape. After the evacuation of Auschwitz in 1945, Münch spent two months at the Dachau concentration camp near Munich.

However, there are doubts as to the truth of this story – another former inmate, Imre Gönczy, alias "Emmerich," paints a very different picture: allegedly, Münch not only participated in selections, but also used the flesh of the dead bodies to cook a broth which was used as a medium for his microbes. He also allegedly infected people, including Gönczy, with rheumatism, Gönczy still suffering the effects of which at the time of a later interview. They met shortly before Münch's death, and the meeting was covered by a journalist from the German newspaper Die Welt. In the meeting, Münch said if he could go back in time and choose to go to Auschwitz again, he would.

== Trial in Poland ==
After the war in 1945, Münch was arrested in a US internment camp after being identified as an Auschwitz physician. He was extradited to Poland in 1946 to stand trial in Kraków.

He was specifically accused of injecting inmates with malaria-infected blood, and with a serum that caused rheumatism; however, many former prisoners testified in support of Münch in their witness speeches. The court acquitted him on 22 December 1947, "not only because he did not commit any crime of harm against the camp prisoners, but because he had a benevolent attitude toward them and helped them, while he had to carry the responsibility. He did this independently from the nationality, race-and-religious origin and political conviction of the prisoners." The court's acquittal was based, among other things, on his strict refusal to participate in the selections.

Of the 40 Auschwitz staff tried in Kraków at the Auschwitz Trial, only Münch was acquitted. He was called the "Good Man of Auschwitz", who had saved prisoners from being murdered in the gas chambers.

== Later life ==
He took over a rural doctor's practice in Roßhaupten in Ostallgäu, Bavaria. In 1964, Münch testified in the first Auschwitz Trial in Frankfurt on Main and in the following trials, he was called on for his expert opinion.

In West Germany, Münch took part in discussion meetings and commemoration ceremonies. He was appreciated for having saved many Auschwitz prisoners at the risk of his own life. In 1995, on the 50th anniversary of the liberation of Auschwitz, he made a journey back to the concentration camp. Münch was invited by Eva Mozes Kor, a survivor of Josef Mengele's experiments on twins. Münch and Kor signed public declarations regarding what had happened there and declaring that such a thing should never be allowed to happen again.

Münch has also commented on Holocaust denial. During an interview Münch, asked about the negationist claim that Auschwitz was a hoax, wearily responded:

When someone says that Auschwitz is a lie, that it is a hoax, I feel hesitation to say much to him. I say, the facts are so firmly determined, that one cannot have any doubt at all, and I stop talking to that person because there is no use. One knows that anyone who clings to such things, which are published somewhere, is a malevolent person who has some personal interest to want to bury in silence things that cannot be buried in silence.

— Münch interviewed by the German filmmaker Bernhard Frankfurter.

During his final years, Münch lived in the Allgäu region, by Forggen Lake. He died aged 90 in 2001.

== Controversies ==
Münch made several controversial statements which caused charges to be filed against him. In 1998, journalist Bruno Schirra published an interview with Münch, conducted a year earlier, in Der Spiegel. Schirra and Münch had watched the epic historical drama film Schindler's List (1993), and the interview was conducted directly after the viewing.

Yes, sure I'm a perpetrator. I have saved a lot of people by killing some other people. [...] I was assessed as humane but not sentenced as a war criminal. I could make experiments with human beings, otherwise only possible with rabbits. This was very important scientific work. [...] There were ideal working conditions, excellent laboratory equipment, and an elite of academics of worldwide reputation. [...] The malaria experiments were quite harmless. I made a test: Is this man immune or not? [...] In the Hygiene-Institute I was king. [...] Perhaps they wouldn't be sent to the gas chambers, but they would have died miserably due to epidemics.

— From an interview by Bruno Schirra

A few days later, Dirk Münch, Münch's son, publicly expressed his lack of comprehension of this interview. He explained that his father had been suffering from poor concentration for two years. He criticised the fact that Schindler's List had been watched directly before the interview, saying that this would have been very exhausting due to the film's three-hour length and his father's advanced age. Dirk Münch stated that, after the film, his father had even confused the female house cat Minka with the male cat Peter. A German filmmaker who made a documentary about Münch also stated that he was not of sound mind. He was later diagnosed with Alzheimer's disease.

=== Criminal proceedings (1998) ===
The Bavarian Justice Ministry initiated proceedings of criminal prosecution as a reaction to the interview. The Zentrale Stelle der Landesjustizverwaltungen zur Aufklärung nationalsozialistischer Verbrechen (the Central Office of the State Justice Administrations for the Investigation of National Socialist Crimes) opened preliminary proceedings. The authorities looked through Stasi-files from the secret police of East Germany (GDR) and demanded Der Spiegel hand over the tape recordings of the Münch interview in order to determine to what extent the public prosecutor should act. The assumptions of possible participation in National Socialist crimes were based on three indications:

- participation in the duty at the selection camp,
- participation in selections directly within the concentration camp
- participation in experiments with human material leading to the death of the test persons.

The criminal proceedings against Münch were dropped in January 2000 due to "progressed dementia". Münch died one year later.

=== Documentary film participation (1999) ===
Münch appeared in the documentary film Die letzten Tage, which was released in 1999 in the US as The Last Days and in Germany in March 2000. As a contemporary witness, he met and talked with camp survivor Renée Firestone, whose sister was murdered in Auschwitz during experiments with humans. A film review pointed out that the American version of the film made no clear indication that Münch suffered from Alzheimer's disease at this time. Only the credits of the film provided this information and then only in French.

=== Proceedings and conviction in France (2000–2001) ===
In 1998, Münch made derogatory statements about Roma and Sinti on the French radio programme France Inter, where he said that the Roma were "pathetic" and the gas chambers would have been the only solution for them. Münch was accused of "incitement of racial hatred". He did not take part in the court hearing. A medical expert opinion had certified him "psychologically disturbed". The acquittal was based on this expert opinion. The Agence France-Presse (AFP) reported on 7 May 2001 that the Court of Appeal of Paris had annulled the June 2000 acquittal.

In May 2001, Münch was convicted in Paris for "incitement of racial hatred" and "belittlement of crimes against humanity". The prosecutor demanded not the imprisonment of Münch but his release on license. Münch was found guilty, but due to his old age and his mental health, the Paris appeal court decided that the 89-year-old Münch should not serve out the sentence. As in the previous proceedings, Münch did not attend the court hearings.

In September 2001, the French Radio rebroadcast the 1998 interview with Münch. Lawyers Without Borders, the International League Against Racism and Anti-Semitism and the Union of French Jewish students lodged complaints. In 2002, all of the accused responsible staff members of the public-law broadcasting institution Radio France were acquitted of the accusation of assistance in incitement to race hatred. The reasoning of the court decision reads that all radio listeners would have understood that Münch's statements about Sinti and Roma and about NS-extermination camps were taken from the Nazi-propaganda.

== Legacy ==
=== Foundation Remembrance, Responsibility and Future ===
The Foundation Remembrance, Responsibility and Future (Stiftung Erinnerung, Verantwortung und Zukunft) has Hans Münch in its listings as a participant in malaria experiments on Auschwitz inmates; however, he is not listed for the malaria experiments in the Dachau concentration camp, which had taken place until 5 April 1945 under the direction of physician Claus Schilling.

=== Fritz Bauer-Institute ===
In 2002 and 2003, the Fritz Bauer-Institute in Frankfurt focused on the analysis of the first Frankfurt Auschwitz Trial and its effects on the socio-political-judicial-historical levels in the Federal Republic of Germany. There was an explicit invitation to participate in the series of public meetings and discussion events on perpetrators' and victims' biographies in the Nazi regime. On 4 November 2002, Prof. Dr. Helgard gave the lecture SS-Ärzte in Auschwitz und im Ersten Frankfurter Auschwitz-Prozess (SS-physicians in Auschwitz and in the first Frankfurt Auschwitz Trial).

In the concentration camp of Auschwitz, the SS-physicians became the technicians of mass murder. The self-presentation of the SS-physicians will be examined focused on the case of the camp physician Eduard Wirths, who wrote a justification note after 1945 and who committed suicide in British arrest as well as focused on the case of Münch, against whom criminal proceedings were initiated by the public prosecutor of Frankfurt due to participation in NS-crimes after an interview with Bruno Shirra published in Der Spiegel in 1998. Münch, who was acquitted as the only one from 40 members of the Auschwitz SS-staff by the highest Polish court in Kraków, became the important 'neutral' witness of the reality in Auschwitz during the first Auschwitz Trial in Frankfurt and gained the status of an expert in later trials. The justifications document of Eduard Wirths had been contributed during the proceedings, too. The special focus of the examinations was, which ideas of humane behaviour and of fairness had been developed in the statements of the SS-physicians on the one hand, and in the judgement reasonings of the first Auschwitz Trial in Frankfurt on the other hand.

—

=== Study: Examination of the previous trials ===
Within the context of Holocaust research, Helgard Kramer reports about details in a study from 2005: Hans Münch was heard in the first Frankfurt Auschwitz Trial and even called as an expert on the 2nd and 5 March 1964. Until the year 2000, the public prosecutor of Frankfurt had only knowledge about the judgement of the Kraków proceedings but not about the protocols and the witness hearings. Münch had stated that he had been forced into the Waffen-SS and that he had come to Birkenau at the end of 1944. During the discussion of the second hearing he corrected himself, stating that he had already arrived in 1943.

The documents of the witness hearing provided the answer of Münch to the precise questions of the prosecutor during the main hearing of 1947:

The camp doctor demanded me to participate in the selections and officially I could not refuse it, because this would have meant insubordination. But I had found a way to avoid these things as a physician.

Münch was questioned about the medical experiments he had effected in Block 10. The questioning was stopped, when he demanded an expert colleague as interrogator. Professor Jan Sehn had prepared the Kraków Trial of 1947 as examining magistrate. He ordered Münch with the medical treatment of another inmate. He also sent the whole stack of files of the Hygiene Institute of the Waffen-SS in Raisko into his cell for "arranging". Then the files were kept by the Kraków journalist Mieczysław Kieta, who later on engaged himself with the most efforts for the exculpation of Münch. Kieta worked within the command range of the SS-Hygienics Institute as a laboratory assistant under the supervision of Münch.

Several concentration camp inmates have certified the fairness of Münch. Three of them are often quoted. The Hungarian medical science professor Geza Mansfeld was regarded as the most important among them. He praised Münch, as he had prevented his selection for the gas chambers and who had given him drugs because Mansfeld suffered from a stomach ulcer. In return Münch obtained training in Serology, Bacteriology and Chemistry. Mansfeld was one of the internationally famous "capacities" in these fields and he was meant to provide his knowledge to the Hygienics Institute for free.

== See also ==
- The Holocaust
- Nazi human experimentation
- Josef Mengele
- Nazi war crimes
