= Louis Micheels =

Dutch Jewish analyst and Holocaust survivor

- Louis Micheels
- Born: Louis J. Micheels; 6 June 1917; Netherlands
- Died: 6 June 2008 (aged 91); Newton, Massachusetts
- Occupation: Psychoanalyst
- Known for: Holocaust survivor
- Notable work: Author of Doctor 117641: A Holocaust Memoir
- Spouse: Ina
- Children: Elizabeth and Ron

Louis J. Micheels (6 June 1917 – 6 June 2008) was a Dutch Jewish physician (psychoanalyst), and survivor of the Auschwitz concentration camp and the Dachau concentration camp. Micheels survived three years as an inmate at Auschwitz and then survived a ten-day Death March to Dachau concentration camp. The Nazis tattooed him with the number 117641 in Auschwitz and in 1989 he wrote a book with that number in the title: Doctor 117641: A Holocaust Memoir.

== Early life ==
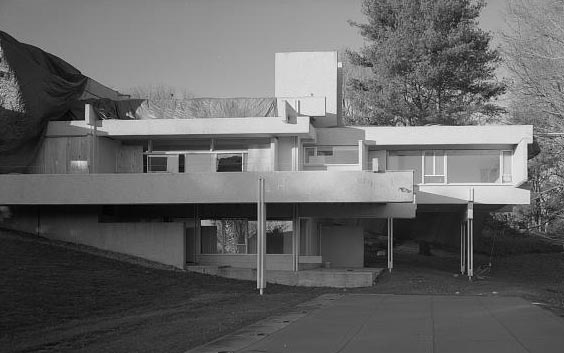
Micheels Paul Rudolph designed home in Connecticut (1970–2006)

He was born in near Amsterdam in the town of Bloemendaal on 6 June 1917 to parents Clara and Albert Micheels and a sister Elf, and brother Lex. He described his upbringing and lifestyle as privileged: his father was a successful broker in Amsterdam. Louis Micheels studied the French and German languages, he rode horse, and he played the cello. The family were Dutch Jewish. In 1938 Micheels began studying at Utrecht University, and he joined a Zionist student group there. He met Nora at one of the Zionist meetings and fell in love.

== World War II ==
When Germany invaded and occupied Holland in 1940 he was a medical student. His siblings had already moved out of Holland years earlier. At first, the German occupation was easy and carefree, but by early 1941, times became tough for Jews. His father lost his business and then the family home was taken. The family moved to nearby Amsterdam to live in the city with other families. Louis' parents refused to leave Amsterdam, but Michaels and his girlfriend Nora decided to leave.

In 1942 Micheels made plans to emigrate to Switzerland where he thought he would be safe from the Nazis. They were captured after they were turned in by Dutch Nazis. He was arrested in Brussels and deported to Auschwitz concentration camp.

Micheels and his (now fiancée) Nora became inmates of the Auschwitz concentration camp in 1942. Micheels had some medical training so he worked as a nurse in the men's ward at the camp. He learned to survive by placating the Kapos and the SS troops. He tried to make himself invisible, and he stayed out of the way of any camp guards who he saw as sadistic. He was able to convince Nazi doctor Eduard Wirths that he was a doctor, which allowed him to get preferential treatment for himself and Nora. He was sent to Monowitz where he was shaved and tattooed number 117641. In the camp, he was witness to the savagery of humans held in camp conditions. He saw Jewish prisoners become predatory and he stated, "The step from being human being to savage was a small one."

On 17 January 1945, when Russian troops were approaching the Auschwitz concentration camp, Micheels and the other prisoners were sent on a Death March to Dachau concentration camp. Many prisoners were killed along the way and the journey took ten days.

According to his own testimony, he was involved in acts of resistance in the camp, such as concealing case records and hiding prisoners who would otherwise be selected for execution due to poor health. He was one of the prisoners assisted by the SS physician there, Hans Münch. One of Münch's last acts before the camp was abandoned was to provide him with a revolver to assist his escape. It was the testimony of prisoners like Micheels that resulted in Münch's acquittal by the Supreme National Tribunal at Auschwitz trials in Kraków in 1947. Münch was the only person acquitted by that tribunal.

== Personal life ==
After the war Micheels moved to the United States and he met a woman named Ina. Louis and Ina were married and had two children: Elizabeth and Ron. He graduated from medical school and became a lecturer at Yale University, Yale School of Medicine. He became an Associate Clinical Professor at Yale and he operated a private practice. He became a psychoanalyst, a member and president of the Western New England Psychoanalytic Institute and Society, practiced psychiatry and psychoanalysis in Westport, Connecticut. He also wrote a memoir about his experiences in Auschwitz, Dr. 117641: A Holocaust Memoir, published by the Yale University Press and translated into at least three languages.

He had a home designed by Paul Rudolph, built in 1970 and demolished in 2007. His home referred to as the Louis Micheels House in Westport has gained recognition as a valuable example of Modernist architecture.

Micheels died on his 91st birthday in 2008 in his home in Newton, Massachusetts. His wife Ina died in 2011.

== Works ==
- Micheels, Louis J. (1989). Doctor #117641: A Holocaust Memoir. Yale University Press. ISBN 978-0-300-04398-3.
