= Løjenkær =

Coordinates: 56°1.2′N 10°07.2′E

Løjenkær is a village and civil parish of the municipality of Århus.

== Notable people ==
- Carl Værnet
