= Horst Schumann =

Nazi SS doctor at Auschwitz (1906–1983)

- Born: 1 May 1906; Halle an der Saale, Kingdom of Prussia, German Empire
- Died: 5 May 1983 (aged 77); Frankfurt am Main, West Germany
- Military career
- Allegiance: Nazi Germany
- Branch: Luftwaffe; Schutzstaffel
- Service years: 1939–1945
- Rank: SS-Sturmbannführer (Major)
- Unit: Auschwitz

Horst Schumann (1 May 1906 – 5 May 1983) was an SS-Sturmbannführer (major) and medical doctor who conducted sterilization and castration experiments at Auschwitz and was particularly interested in the mass sterilization of Jews by means of X-rays. Hors d'atteinte, a book by Frédéric Couderc, published in France by Les Escales and Pocket, reveals the extent of Schumann's crimes and his life as a fugitive in Africa.

== Early life ==
Schumann was born on 1 May 1906 in Halle an der Saale. His father, Paul Schumann, was also a doctor. Schumann entered the Nazi party in 1930 and joined the Sturmabteilung in 1932. In 1933, he received his medical degree after producing a thesis entitled "Frage der Jodresorption und der therapeutischen Wirkung sog. Jodbäder" ("The Question of Iodine Absorption and the Therapeutic Effects of so-called Iodine Baths"). He started his career as an assistant doctor in the Surgical Clinic of the clinic of Halle University.

== Nazi doctor ==
From 1934, Schumann was employed in the Public Health Office in Halle. He was recruited to the air force as a physician in 1939. He joined the Aktion T4 Euthanasia program in early October 1939, after a meeting with Dr. Viktor Brack in Hitler's chancellery. In January 1940, Schumann became head of the Grafeneck euthanasia centre in Württemberg, where mentally ill people were gassed with carbon monoxide in the first gas chamber. In the early summer of 1940, he was ordered to the Sonnenstein Euthanasia Centre. Schumann also belonged to a commission of doctors called "Action 14f13", who transferred weak and sick prisoners from Auschwitz, Buchenwald, Dachau, Flossenbürg, Gross-Rosen, Mauthausen, Neuengamme and Niederhangen concentration camps to the euthanasia killing centers.

== Auschwitz ==
On 28 July 1941, Schumann arrived in Auschwitz. He worked at Block 30 in the women's hospital, where he set up an X-ray station in 1942. Here men and women were forcibly sterilized by being positioned repeatedly for several minutes between two X-ray machines, the rays aiming at their sexual organs. Most subjects died after great suffering, or were gassed immediately because the radiation burns from which they suffered rendered them unfit for work. Schumann "...chose his test persons himself. They were always young, healthy, good-looking Jewish men, women and girls who looked like old people afterwards. The parts of the body that were treated with the rays experienced severe radiation burns and suppuration (i.e. discharge of pus). Men's testicles and women's ovaries were then surgically removed and sent to Breslau for histopathological examination. Part of Schumann's control tests, to check whether the radiation had worked, was the so-called semen check: a stick covered with a rubber hose was inserted into the rectum of the victim and the glands stimulated until ejaculation occurred so that the ejaculate could be tested for sperm..." Both kinds of samples were sent to the University of Breslau (today Wrocław) for examination.

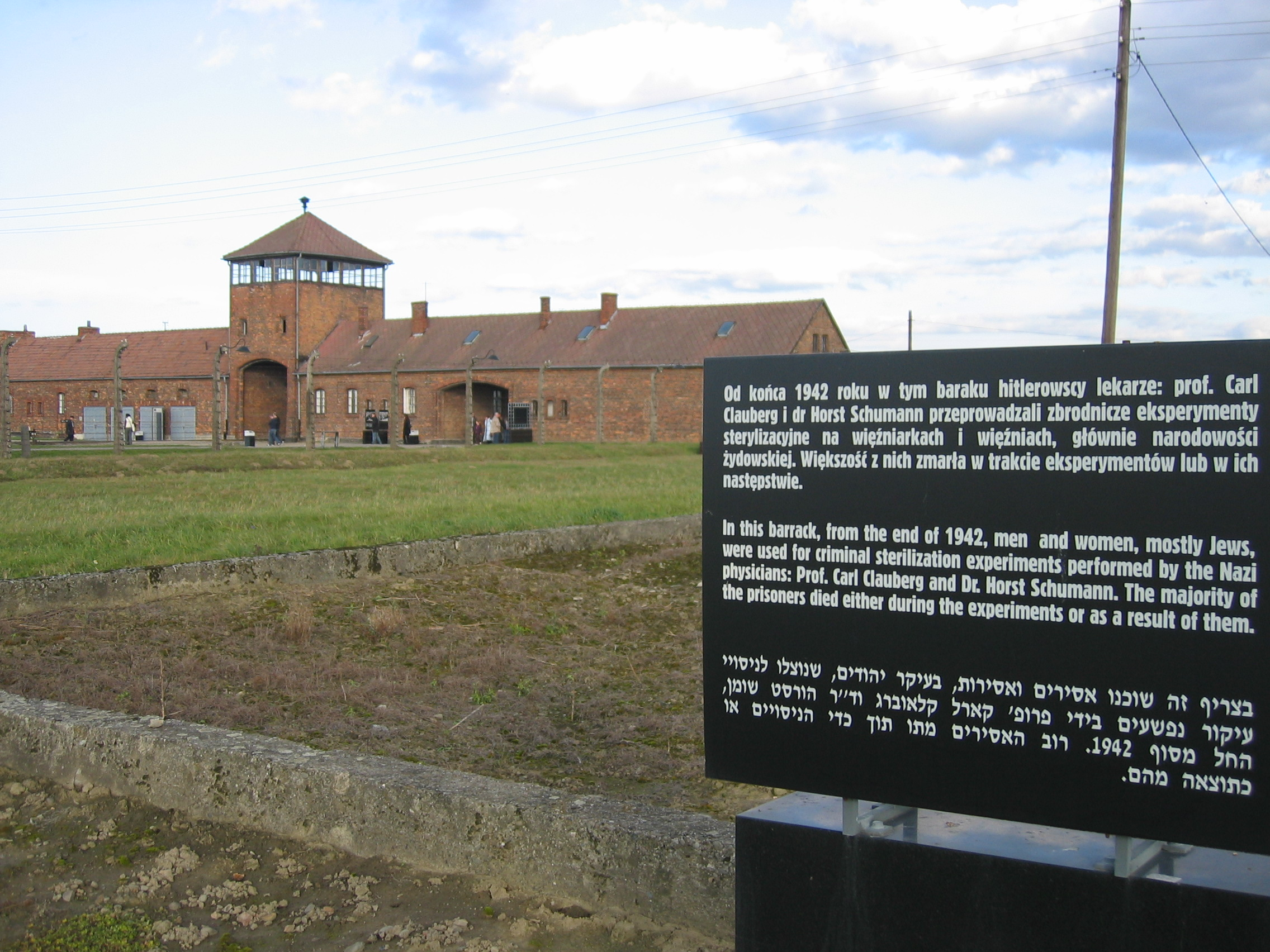
Remains of the building at Auschwitz II (Birkenau) where Schumann committed his medical atrocities

Schumann selected some of the women in Block 10 in the main camp of Auschwitz. In this Block Jewish women had been imprisoned for human experiments. To control the radiation on women, prisoner doctors (Dr. Maximilian Samuel, Dr. Wladislaw Dering) had to remove an ovary.

Schumann also performed typhus experiments by injecting people with blood from typhus patients and then attempting to cure the newly infected subjects. Schumann left Auschwitz in September 1944 and was appointed to the Sonnenstein Clinic in Saxony which had earlier been converted into a military hospital.

== Medical career after the war ==
While serving as a military doctor on the Western Front, he was captured by the Americans in January 1945. He was released from captivity in October 1945. In April 1946, he began to work as a sports doctor for the city of Gladbeck. An application for a license for a hunting gun led to his identity being exposed in 1951, so the German Democratic Republic issued an arrest warrant. According to his own statement, Schumann served as a ship's doctor for three years and because he did not have a German passport, he applied for one in Japan in 1954 and received it under his own name. Schumann then fled, first to Egypt and eventually settled in Khartoum in Sudan as head of a hospital. He was forced to flee from Sudan in 1962 after being recognized by an Auschwitz survivor. Then he went to Ghana, where he received the protection of the head of state, Kwame Nkrumah, until Nkrumah was overthrown.

== Imprisonment and death ==
In 1966, Schumann was extradited from Ghana to West Germany where the trial against him was opened in Frankfurt on 23 September 1970. Charged with killing 30,000 Jews, Schumann admitted to killing as many as 80,000 Jews, saying "I have no numbers". However, Schumann was released from prison on 29 July 1972 due to his heart condition and generally deteriorating health. He died on 5 May 1983, 11 years after he had been released. As Robert Jay Lifton has observed "...Schumann has great importance for us because of what he did – intense involvement in both direct medical killing and unusually brutal Auschwitz experiments – and what he was – an ordinary, but highly Nazified man and doctor..."

== See also ==
- The Holocaust
- Nazi human experimentation
- Josef Mengele
- Carl Clauberg
- Eduard Wirths
