= Bruno Weber (doctor) =

German physician, bacteriologist and Hauptsturmführer at Auschwitz

Bruno Nikolaus Maria Weber (21 May 1915 in Trier – 23 September 1956 in Homburg) was a German physician, bacteriologist and Hauptsturmführer (1944), at Auschwitz, in the branch of the Hygiene Institute of the Waffen SS. He was chief of the Hygienic Institute. He organised experiments involving the interaction of different human blood types in unwilling prisoner-patients. He also conducted experiments using barbiturates and morphine derivatives for mind-control purposes. He was made Obersturmführer der reserve on 20 April 1943, SS-Sanitatsamt, and given the SS number 420759.

After the war, he was charged with murdering prisoners. He is also known to have experimented with the use of psychotropic drugs during interrogation. On the ramp in the Birkenau camp, he took part in the selection of Jews deported to Auschwitz, the majority of whom were murdered by the Nazis in the gas chambers immediately after arrival.

== Personal life ==
Before the start of World War II, Weber (according to the SS doctor Hans Münch) earned his doctorate in medicine in the United States on a scholarship. In 1942, the Wehrmacht transferred him to the Waffen SS, where he reached the rank of Obersturmführer in January 1943, and was promoted to Hauptsturmführer in November 1944.

== Professional life ==
By May 1943, Weber was Head of the Sanitary-bacteriological investigation authority of the Waffen-SS and Police South-East in the central warehouse Rajsko of Auschwitz I. At the instigation of the SS garrison doctor Eduard Wirths, this institute was used for the containment of typhoid and other epidemics. The epidemics at Auschwitz also threatened the camp staff of the SS. The Sanitary-Bacteriological investigation authority of the Waffen SS and Police South East had the following objectives:

- Supply of SS and Police hospitals in the protected area
- Supply of Auschwitz and its satellite camps
- Examination and the study of infections
- Special examinations, such as blood, urine and faeces analysis
- Research and testing of new drugs (sulfonamides).

Weber's staff included the SS doctors Hans Münch as his deputy and Hans Delmotte. Prisoner doctors were also forced to work in the Institute of Hygiene.

Some of these "special studies" occurred in block 10, where Jewish women were held. The laboratory was where Weber experimented with blood, which was analysed by the inmate physician Dr. Slavka Kleinová, among other prisoners, who were bled and injected with other blood groups, in order to test the compatibility of blood types. This usually produced high fever. After the evacuation of the Auschwitz concentration camp, Dr. Weber was used as an SS doctor in the Dachau concentration camp.

== After the war ==
He was arrested in July 1946 by members of the British Army and then transferred to Poland. In October 1946, Weber was questioned by members of the Polish Commission for the Investigation of War Crimes on suspicion of involvement in crimes committed on prisoners in Auschwitz. There he was determined to have not played a role in the Auschwitz concentration camp, "and not been an official" there. Weber was not prosecuted. He died a free man.

== Literature ==
- Ernst Klee: Auschwitz, die NS-Medizin und ihre Opfer. 3. Ernst Klee: Auschwitz, the Nazi Medicine and its victims 3. Auflage. Edition. S. Fischer Verlag, Frankfurt am Main, 1997, ISBN 3-596-14906-1. S. Fischer Verlag, Frankfurt am Main, 1997, ISBN 3-596-14906-1.
- Ernst Klee: Das Personenlexikon zum Dritten Reich: Wer war was vor und nach 1945. Fischer-Taschenbuch-Verlag, Frankfurt am Main 2007. ISBN 978-3-596-16048-8 Ernst Klee: The People Encyclopedia of the Third Reich: Who was that before and after 1945 Fischer paperback publishing house, Frankfurt 2007th. ISBN 978-3-596-16048-8.
- Hermann Langbein: Menschen in Auschwitz; Frankfurt am Main, Berlin, Wien: Ullstein, 1980; ISBN 3-548-33014-2. Hermann Langbein: People in Auschwitz, Frankfurt, Berlin, Vienna: Harper, 1980, ISBN 3-548-33014-2.
- Mieczysław Kieta: Das Hygiene-Institut der Waffen-SS und Polizei in Auschwitz. Mieczysław Kieta: The Hygiene Institute of the Waffen-SS and Police Auschwitz. In: Die Auschwitz-Hefte. In: The Auschwitz-books. Band 1, Rogner und Bernhard, Hamburg 1994, ISBN 3-8077-0282-2. Volume 1, Rogner and Bernhard, Hamburg 1994, ISBN 3-8077-0282-2.
- Hans-Joachim Lang: Die Frauen von Block 10. Hans-Joachim Lang: The Women of Block 10 Medizinische Experimente in Auschwitz. Hamburg 2011. ISBN 978-3-455-50222-0 Medical experiments at Auschwitz. Hamburg 2011 ISBN 978-3-455-50222-0
- Konserwacja dokumentów SS-Hygiene Institut Ewelina Bisaga, Nel Jastrzębiowska, Mirosław Maciaszczyk Published by the Auschwitz-Birkenau State Museum, Oświęcim 2011 62 pp.; soft cover ISBN 978-83-7704-026-3
