= Ernst Holzlöhner =

German physiologist

Ernst Holzlöhner (23 February 1899 in Insterburg – 14 June 1945 in Mohrkirch) was a German physiologist, university lecturer, and Nazi involved in the Nazi experiments on humans.

== Biography ==
Holzlöhner was the son of Martha Holzlöhner, née Koch, and her husband, the school administrator Albert Holzlöhner. From 1917 to 1919 he served in World War I. He then studied medicine at the universities of Freiburg, Kiel, Greifswald, Graz and finally Würzburg, where he received his doctorate in 1923 with the dissertation Über einen Fall von präsystolischem Galopprhythmus mit gleichzeitigem 'Flint'schen Geräusch' bei einer Aorteninsuffizienz (On a case of presystolic gallop rhythm with simultaneous 'Flint'schen noise' in an aortic insufficiency). Holzlöhner was a private lecturer and senior physician with Wilhelm Trendelenburg at the Physiological Institute of the University of Berlin. In 1932 he became a non-official A.O. Professor. In 1933 he joined the NSDAP and became lecturer at the University of Berlin. Later, Holzlöhner became a SS-Sturmbannführer. In 1934, Holzlöhner received a full professorship for physiology at the University of Kiel. During this time, he became a lecturer at Kiel and deputy leader of the Schleswig-Holstein lecturers' association. Together with his assistants Sigmund Rascher and Erich Finke, he carried out sub-cooling experiments on behalf of the Luftwaffe in the Dachau concentration camp from August 1942, in which prisoners were deliberately chilled, i.e. by immersing prisoners in tanks of ice water to simulate hypothermia, then reheated using different methods. At the conference on medical questions in distress and winter death on October 26 and 27, 1942, he discussed the results of the cold tests. In April 1945, Holzlöhner was appointed Rector of the University of Kiel.

A photograph of Rascher and Holzlöhner appeared in Life in a feature on the Nuremberg medical tribunal with the caption 'Human Laboratory Animals'.

Holzlöhner was captured and interrogated by British soldiers after the end of the war. After the interrogation, he committed suicide and attempted to kill his family as well in 1945; his eleven-year-old daughter died, while his wife and another daughter survived the attempted carbon monoxide poisoning.
