= Eduard Wirths =

German Nazi physician (1909–1945)

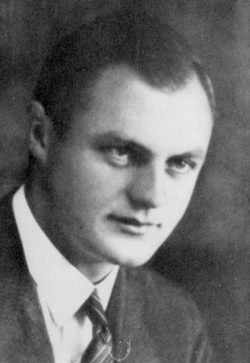
- Wirths in 1939
- Born: 4 September 1909; Würzburg, Kingdom of Bavaria, German Empire
- Died: 20 September 1945 (aged 36); Staumühle, British zone, Allied-occupied Germany
- Spouse: Gertrud Petavy
- Children: 4
- Military career
- Allegiance: Nazi Germany
- Branch: Schutzstaffel
- Service years: 1933–1945
- Rank: SS-Obersturmbannführer
- Commands: Formal responsibility of medical staff at Auschwitz; human medical experimentation performed on prisoners at Auschwitz
- Awards: War Merit Cross 1st Class With Swords; German Social Welfare Decoration 2nd Class

Eduard Wirths (4 September 1909 – 20 September 1945) was the chief SS doctor (SS-Standortarzt) at the Auschwitz concentration camp from September 1942 to January 1945. Thus, Wirths had formal responsibility for everything undertaken by the nearly twenty SS doctors (including Josef Mengele, Horst Schumann and Carl Clauberg) who worked in the medical sections of Auschwitz between 1942 and 1945.

== Early life ==
Eduard Wirths was born in Würzburg, Bavaria into a Catholic family with social democratic and democratic socialist leanings. His father served as a medical corpsman in the First World War and according to Robert Jay Lifton had emerged from the war "...in a depressed state with pacifist leanings, which were undoubtedly expressed in his (as one son put it) 'making doctors of us all...'" Wirth's younger brother, Helmut, became a notable gynecologist (who later went to Auschwitz to visit his brother to participate in cancer experiments but said that he left after only a few days on his brother Eduard's advice, due to a disagreement and because of his revulsion of the place). According to Lifton "...Among the boys it was Eduard who came most under the father’s influence in becoming meticulous, obedient, and unusually conscientious and reliable — traits that continued into his adult life. He never smoked or drank and was described as compassionate and "soft" in his responses to others..." Wirths father was liberal, and he grew up in a household under an "atmosphere of humanism and democratic socialism".

== Nazi party membership ==
Eduard Wirths, however, became an ardent Nazi while studying medicine at the University of Würzburg (1930–35). He joined the Nazi Party and the SA in June 1933 and applied for admission into the SS in 1934. He entered the Waffen SS in 1939, saw action in Norway and the Russian Front and was classified as medically unfit for combat duty in the spring of 1942 after having a heart attack. Wirths then chose to undertake special training for Department leaders in Dachau Concentration Camp and served as chief SS psychiatrist in Neuengamme concentration camp during July 1942. Coincidentally, in 1942, Josef Mengele was also wounded at the Russian Front, pronounced medically unfit for combat, and promoted to the rank of SS-Hauptsturmführer before being assigned to Auschwitz.

== Auschwitz (1942–1945) ==
Wirths was promoted to SS-Hauptsturmführer (captain) and appointed as chief camp physician at Auschwitz in September, 1942. He was appointed on the basis of his reputation as a competent doctor and committed Nazi who would be capable of stopping the typhus epidemics that had increasingly affected SS personnel at Auschwitz.

Wirths was a profound anti-Semite. At Auschwitz, Wirths was known to be protective of "Aryan" prisoner doctors and other prisoners, such as Hermann Langbein, and to have improved conditions on the medical blocks and was remembered favourably by most prisoner doctors and other inmates who had contact with him. At the same time, Wirths approved of harsh treatment of Jewish people and he recommended Josef Mengele for promotion in August 1944. Wirths considered Mengele as of "open, honest, firm … [and] absolutely dependable" character and "magnificent" intellectual and physical talents; of the "discretion, perseverance, and energy with which he has fulfilled every task … and … shown himself equal to every situation"; of his "valuable contribution to anthropological science by making use of the scientific materials available to him"; of his "absolute ideological firmness" and "faultless conduct [as] an SS officer"; and personal qualities as "free, unrestrained, persuasive, and lively" discourse that rendered him "especially dear to his comrades".

Rudolf Höss, the commandant of Auschwitz between 1940 and December 1943, is said to have held Wirths in particularly high regard. He is said to have remarked of Wirths that "During my 10 years of service in concentration-camp affairs, I have never encountered a better one."

In 1943 the impact on inmates of Wirths' actions at Auschwitz resulted in his receiving a Christmas card from Hermann Langbein, a political prisoner who worked with him, which contained the message “In the past year you have saved here the lives of 93,000 people. We do not have the right to tell you our wishes. But we wish for ourselves that you stay here in the coming year.” It was signed: “One speaking for the prisoners of Auschwitz.” The figure of 93,000 was the difference in mortality rate among prisoners from typhus in the year prior to Wirths' arrival. In 1943–45, Wirths protected the Austrian nurse Maria Stromberger against accusations by several SS men at Auschwitz, as Stromberger took charge of and contained the typhus infections and, working for the Auschwitz resistance, saved many prisoners herself. However, Wirths was unaware of Stromberger's clandestine work for the resistance. After the war, Langbein called Wirths an "anständiger Nazi"– a decent Nazi.

=== Prisoner experimentation ===
Wirths was involved in ordering medical experimentation, particularly in gynecological and typhus-related experimental tests. Wirths's primary research concerned pre-cancerous growths of the cervix. Wirths was also interested in the sterilization of women, by removing their ovaries through surgery or radiation. It is generally acknowledged that he himself never directly participated in such experiments but delegated their conduct to subordinates. The victims of these experiments were Jewish women who had been imprisoned in Block 10 of the main camp in Auschwitz. E.W.J. Pearce, an associate professor of Obstetrics and Gynecology at the Truman Medical Center has made the following observation regarding Wirths' medical experiments: ". . . Wirths, without consent, photographed the cervices of women prisoners, then amputated the pictured cervices, and sent both photographs and specimens for study to Dr. Hinselmann of Berlin". Hinselmann was the physician who developed colposcopy.

=== Selection of prisoners ===
Importantly, Wirths also asserted medical control of prisoner selections at the Auschwitz-Birkenau camp, which, prior to spring 1943, had been conducted by the camp commander and his subordinates. Wirths insisted upon taking his own personal turn in performing selections, which he could have deferred to physician subordinates. Witness testimony given at the Trial of Adolf Eichmann provided a useful insight into how the SS approached the issue of how to record the deaths of Auschwitz prisoners (this did not include those who had been immediately selected for gassing – their admission was simply not recorded in the death registers). Those who died while imprisoned at Auschwitz were always recorded as having died from natural causes and never from being executed or murdered.

Wirths was promoted to SS-Sturmbannführer (major) in September 1944. Following the evacuation of Auschwitz in January 1945 he was transferred, along with many other former Auschwitz personnel, to the Mittelbau-Dora concentration camp in Thuringia. Wirths again held the post of chief camp physician until Mittelbau-Dora's evacuation in April 1945.

== Capture and suicide ==
Wirths was captured by the Allies at the end of the war and held in custody by British forces. Later, on 20 September 1945, knowing that he would face trial for war crimes, Wirths committed suicide by hanging.

In 2014 Wirths' son Peter donated his father's photo albums to the USHMM – these contain photos of the Wirths family at the Solahütte, Wirths with Rudolf Höss, pictures of the old village of Birkenau before it was destroyed and pictures of the building of the SS hospital at Auschwitz.

== Summary of SS career ==
Robert Jay Lifton has said that

. . . Wirths was significantly immersed in Nazi ideology in three crucial spheres: the claim of revitalizing the German race and Volk; the biomedical path to that revitalization via purification of genes and race; and the focus on the Jews as a threat to this renewal, to the immediate and long-term "health" of the Germanic race. While Wirths did not absolutize these convictions in the manner of Mengele — they were in him combined with a strong current of medical humanism — his commitment to the Nazi cause was probably no less strong . . .

Perhaps illustrative of Wirths' commitment to medical 'leadership' was his tendency while at Auschwitz to drive about in a car flying a Red Cross flag as well as his enthusiasm for acting as a marriage counselor and personal adviser to other SS personnel. According to Helgard Kramer, Wirths

. . . first seized on a career as a military doctor and officer in the German elite troops of the SS, because he desperately wanted to become a member of the upper class; eventually to provide his future wife with a "decent marriage". To reach that goal he had to become a "tough man"...

== SS ranks and awards ==
Ranks

- September 1942, Promotion to SS-Hauptsturmführer
- September 1944 Promotion to SS-Sturmbannführer
- Final rank in the SS: SS-Obersturmbannführer

Awards during SS career

- War Merit Cross 1st Class With Swords
- Iron Cross 2nd Class 1939
- DRL-Sports Badge in Bronze
- German Social Welfare Medal 2nd Class
- Eastern Front Winter Medal

== See also ==
- Hans Münch
- List of people who died by suicide by hanging
