= Block 10 =

Barrack at Auschwitz

Coordinates: 50.0254°N 19.2035°E

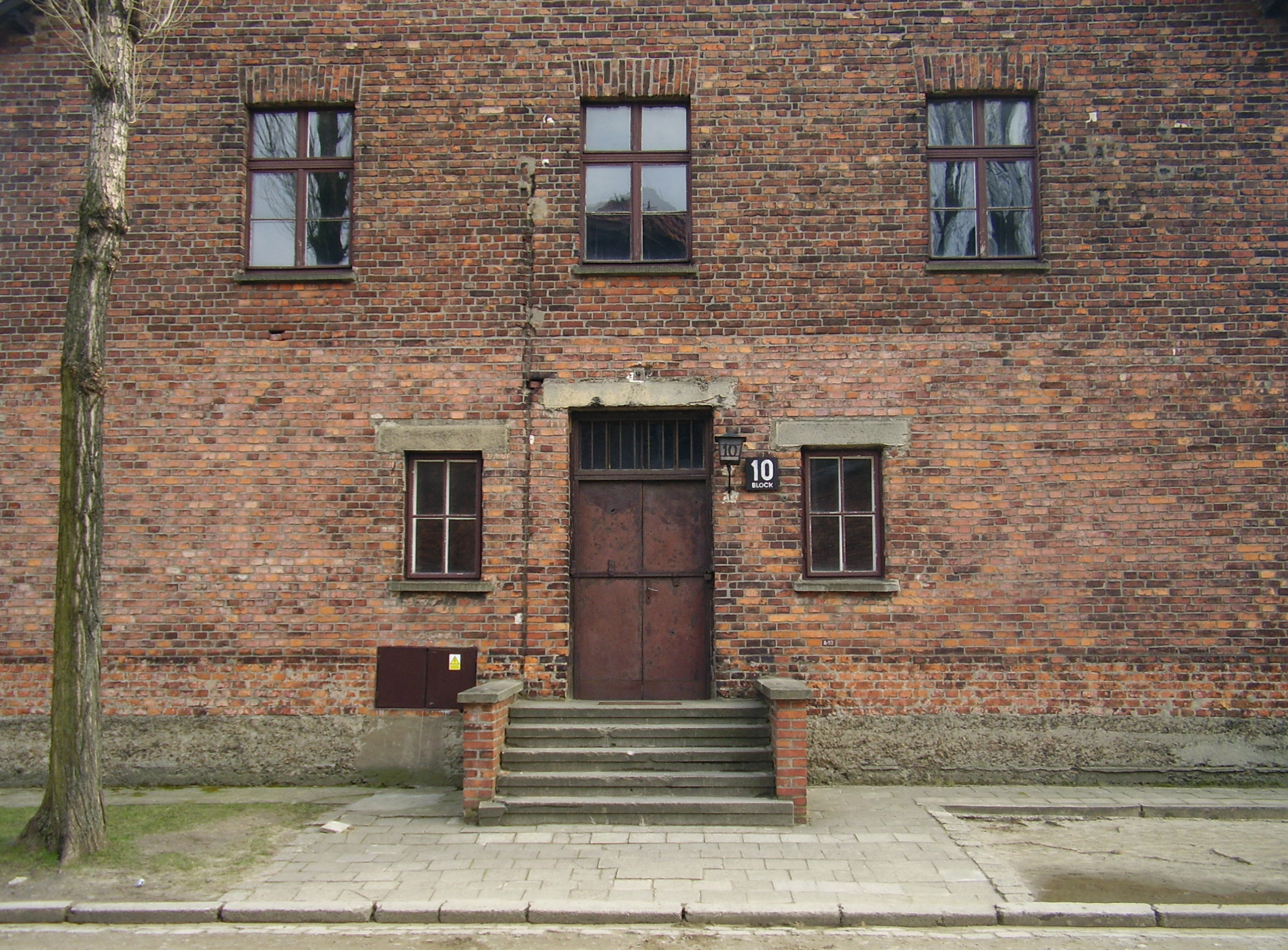
Block 10

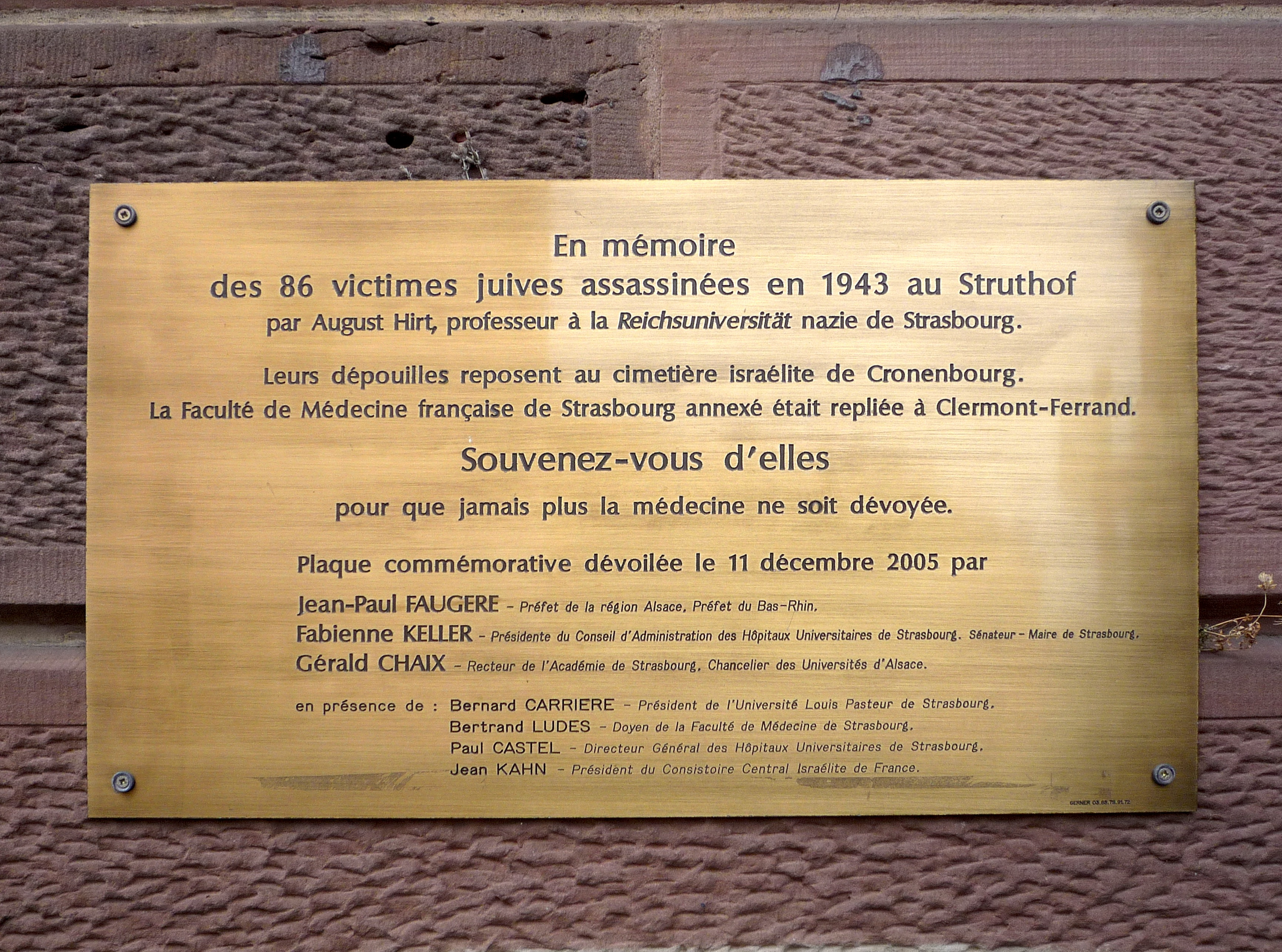
Memorial plaque at the Institute of Anatomy in Strasbourg. Translated, it reads, in part: "In memory of 86 Jews murdered in 1943 at Struthof by August Hirt, professor at the Nazi Reichsuniversität in Strasbourg. Their remains rest in the Jewish cemetery in Cronenbourg....Remember them so that medicine shall never again be misguided."

Block 10 was a barrack at the Auschwitz concentration camp where men and women were used as experimental subjects for Nazi doctors. The experiments in Block 10 tested bodily reactions to various substances, ranging from no effect to sterilization.

Although Block 10 was in Auschwitz I, a part of the camp mainly used for male political prisoners, the experiments conducted were mostly on women. The main doctors who worked in Block 10 were Carl Clauberg, Horst Schumann, Eduard Wirths, Bruno Weber and August Hirt. Each of them had different methods in doing experiments on the inmates.

The prisoners at Auschwitz were also deported to other sites where experimental subjects were needed. For example, twenty Jewish children were transported to the Neuengamme concentration camp in Hamburg where they were injected with virulent tubercular serum and subjected to other experiments, and later murdered at the Bullenhuser Damm school.

== The doctors ==
- Carl Clauberg — He focused on sterilization by injection. His method was to inject a caustic substance into the cervix in order to obstruct the fallopian tubes. Subjects died during the sterilization whilst others experienced severe pain and infection. His experimental subjects were married women between the ages of twenty and forty who had already had children.
- Horst Schumann — His experimental subjects were healthy men and women in their late teens or early twenties, on whom he attempted X-ray sterilization. Victims experienced radiation burns and suppuration upon exposure. The body parts that were affected, mainly the ovaries and testicles, were then surgically removed for examination.
- Eduard Wirths — He focused on the pre-cancerous growth of cervixes, where he frequently photographed cervixes of female prisoners without their consent, amputated them and sent both the photographs and specimen to Dr. Hinselmann. In addition, he sterilized many women by subjecting their ovaries to radiation or surgical removal. He also promoted Josef Mengele in August 1944.
- Bruno Weber — He tested the compatibility of blood types by bleeding prisoners and injecting them with other blood groups. He also experimented on barbiturates and morphine derivatives for mind control purposes.
- August Hirt — He was responsible for organizing a Jewish skull collection from 86 prisoners, to prove their "racial inferiority". He also tested mustard gas on prisoners.

== See also ==
- Unit 731
