= Louis Micheels House =

Modernist house in Connecticut

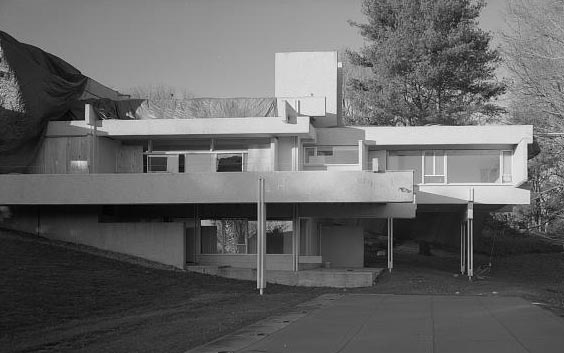
- Louis Micheels House south elevation, east wing, view north
- Interactive map of the Louis Micheels House area

General information
- Status: Demolished
- Type: Single family home
- Architectural style: Modern architecture Brutalist architecture
- Location: 16 Minute Man Hill
- Coordinates: 41°06′44″N 73°21′01″W
- Completed: 1972
- Demolished: 2007
- Owner: Dr. Louis J. and Ina Micheels

Height
- Height: 28.10 ft (8.56 m)

Technical details
- Floor count: 2
- Floor area: 4,200 sq ft (390 m^{2})

Design and construction
- Architect: Paul Rudolph
- Structural engineer: David Hofman
- Main contractor: Charles Remlin

Louis Micheels House was a single family home in Westport, Connecticut, designed in the style of the Sarasota School of Architecture by founder Paul Rudolph. Built in 1972, it was considered an example of Modern and Brutalist architecture. The home was commissioned by Louis Micheels, and it was razed in 2007.

== History ==
=== Construction ===
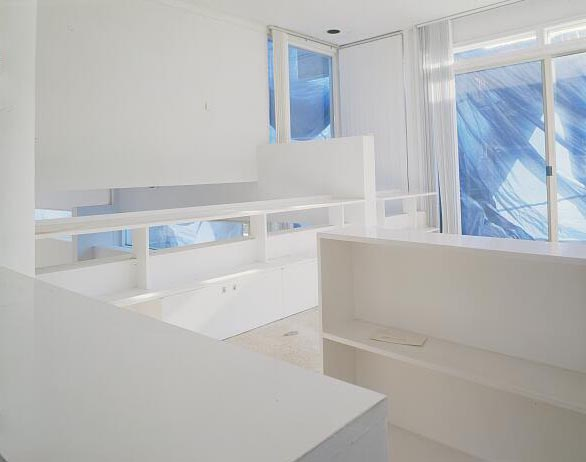
Louis Micheels House west wing office view southeast showing built-in bookcases and cabinets

The Louis Micheels House was a 4,200 sq ft (390 m^{2}) home in Westport, Connecticut, a town on Long Island Sound. It was designed by Paul Rudolph, a founder of the Sarasota School of Architecture, and completed in 1972. The building is named for the owners who commissioned the project, Dr. and Mrs. Louis Micheels. The land was purchased by the Micheels on July 12, 1971, and Rudolph was hired to design a home which had a "light, airy feeling".

=== Demolition ===
In 2005 Louis and Ina Micheels began trying to sell the property. The asking price was 5 million dollars and by late 2006 the building had not found a buyer. The town of Westport began to take an interest in saving the building in 2006. The town issued 92 demolition permits for buildings in the area in 2006 alone and they feared that a new buyer would demolish the building to make way for a modern home. One media outlet reported on the potential for a raze permit to demolish the house in a section they entitled "Teardown of the Day." Because of the publicity the town's Historic District Commission took an interest. At 34 years old, the building was not old enough to trigger the town's "Delay of Demolition" ordinance. The National Trust for Historic Preservation determined the home was of "great significance". Next, the State Historic Preservation Office became involved. On December 21, 2006, the Connecticut Trust filed suit to stop the planned demolition of the building. A buyer who wanted to preserve the building was found. When no deal happened Connecticut's Attorney General Richard Blumenthal filed an injunction prohibiting demolition. Despite the efforts of the officials to stop the building's demolition, the Micheels made a deal with a couple who planned to raze the building.

David and Yvette Waldman purchased the building in 2007, paying $3.234 million for the property. The couple immediately had the building razed to make way for a larger 6,200 sq ft (580 m^{2}) home, and attended the demolition. In 2013, the Sarasota Herald Tribune reported, "Micheels himself opposed a historic designation that could have impeded demolition. He had 3.2 million reasons." Louis Micheels died less than one year after the sale of the home.

== Design ==
The home was designed in the style of Brutalist architecture. It was designed with floating sections that can be seen in Rudolph's later designs (like the Bass Residence in Fort Worth Texas). It had a multiple levels and cantilevered geometric flat planes. The master bedroom was cantilevered from a hillside, and supported with thin piers. To provide shade, thin panels were cantilevered above the windows. The interior of the building was filled with stark white wallboard and white cabinetry.

The exterior walls took on a rough stucco-like appearance: there were pieces of quartz in the finish which gave the walls a rough texture. The home sat on top of a hill and was supported on one side and cantilevered on the other.
