= Ernst-Robert Grawitz =

German Nazi physician and SS-Obergruppenführer (1899–1945)

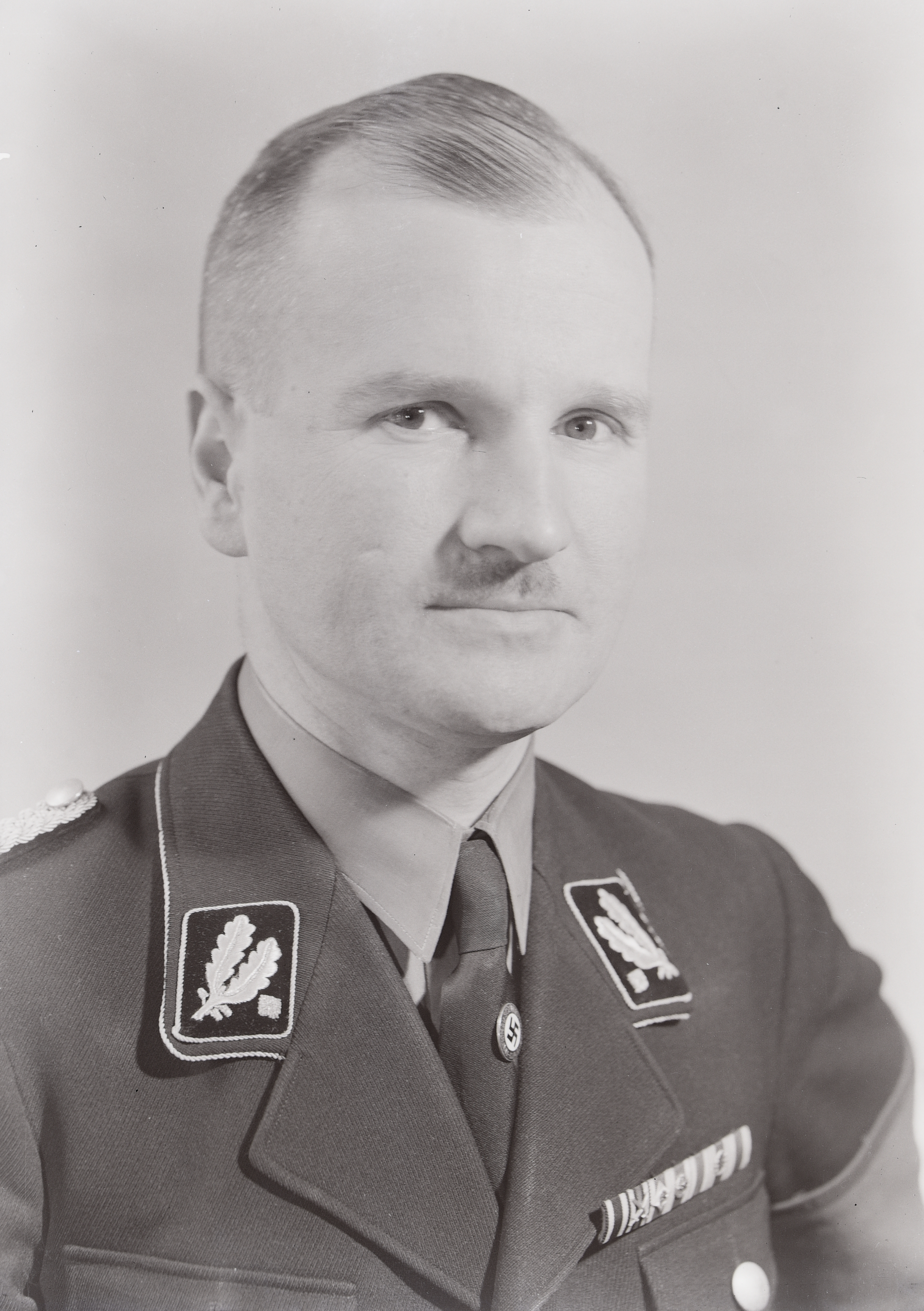
- Born: 8 June 1899; Charlottenburg, Brandenburg, Prussia, German Empire
- Died: 24 April 1945 (aged 45); Potsdam-Babelsberg, Gau March of Brandenburg, Nazi Germany
- Military career
- Allegiance: Nazi Germany
- Branch: German Red Cross
- Rank: SS-Obergruppenführer

Ernst-Robert Grawitz (8 June 1899 – 24 April 1945) was a German physician and an SS functionary (Reichsarzt, "Arzt" meaning "physician") during the Nazi era. Grawitz funded Nazi programs involving experimentation on inmates in Nazi concentration camps and was part of the group in charge of the murder of mentally ill and physically disabled people in the Aktion T4 programme. In April 1945, as the Soviet Red Army advanced on Berlin, Grawitz killed himself and his family using hand grenades.

== Biography ==
Grawitz was born in Charlottenburg, in the western part of Berlin, Germany. As Reichsarzt SS und Polizei (Reich Physician SS and Police), Grawitz was also de facto head of the DRK, the German Red Cross, between 1937 and 1945, changing substantially DRK from its original Red Cross principles.

According to Peter Tatchell, Grawitz met a Copenhagen doctor named Carl Værnet and proposed that Værnet perform research on behalf of the SS into a so-called "cure" for homosexuality, which involved experimentation on inmates at Buchenwald concentration camp. Grawitz himself was chief medical officer of the SS and an "enthusiastic experimenter on concentration camp inmates".

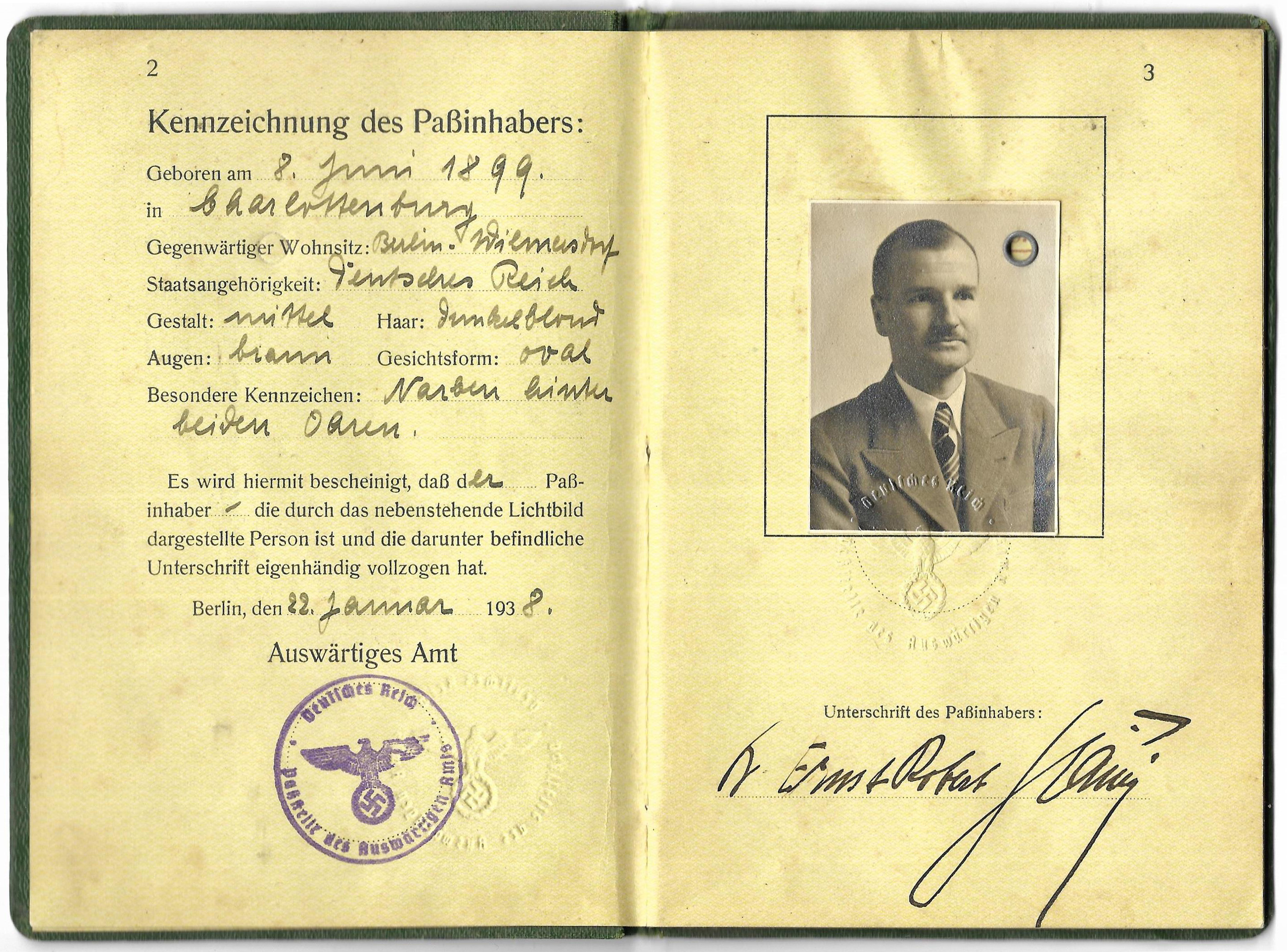
German Diplomatic passport issued in 1938 to Ernst-Robert Grawitz to attend the 16th International Red Cross conference in the UK.

Grawitz was also a part of the group in charge of the murder of mentally ill and physically handicapped people in the Aktion T4 "euthanasia" programme, including children from 1939. The officials selected the doctors who were to carry out the operational part of the killing programme. In addition, researchers both in and outside the SS wanted to exploit the supply of inmates held in the SS camps and use them for experiments. In order to do so, the interested parties had to apply to Grawitz, who forwarded requests to Reichsführer-SS Heinrich Himmler who then gave final approval.

Towards the end of World War II in Europe, Grawitz was a physician in Adolf Hitler's Führerbunker. When he heard that other officials were leaving Berlin in order to escape the advancing Soviet Red Army, Grawitz petitioned Hitler to allow him to leave Berlin; his request was denied. As the Soviet Red Army advanced on Berlin, Grawitz killed himself and his family with grenades at their house in Babelsberg.
