= Carl Clauberg =

German gynaecologist and Auschwitz experimenter

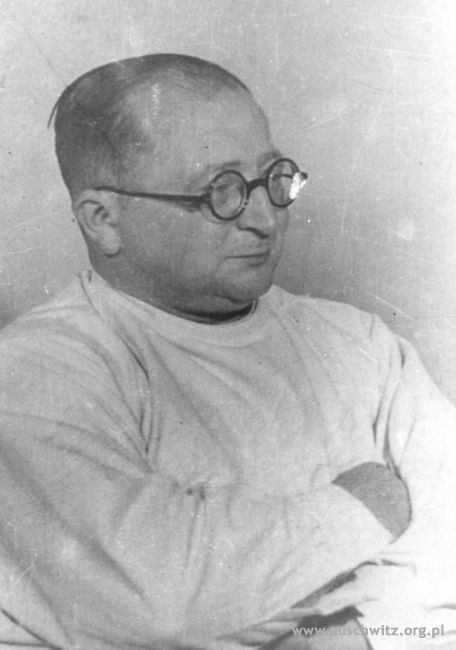
- Clauberg in 1942
- Born: 28 September 1898; Wupperhof, German Empire
- Died: 9 August 1957 (aged 58); Kiel, West Germany
- Military career
- Allegiance: German Empire; Weimar Republic; Nazi Germany
- Branch: Schutzstaffel
- Rank: SS-Gruppenführer der Reserve

Carl Clauberg (28 September 1898 – 9 August 1957) was a German gynecologist who conducted medical experiments on Jewish and Romani women at Auschwitz concentration camp. He worked with Horst Schumann in X-ray sterilization experiments at Auschwitz concentration camp.

In 1945, near the close of WWII, he was captured by the Red Army and sentenced to 25 years in prison. He was released in 1955 under a prisoner exchange agreement, and he returned to Germany and continued to practice medicine. Due to public outcry from Holocaust survivors, Clauberg was arrested in 1955, but died before he could be tried.

== Early life ==
Carl Clauberg was born in 1898 in Wupperhof (now part of Leichlingen), Rhine Province, into a family of craftsmen.

== Medical career ==
During the First World War he served as an infantryman. After the war, he studied medicine and eventually reached the rank of chief doctor at Kiel University's gynaecological clinic. He joined the Nazi party in 1933 and later was appointed associate professor of gynaecology at the University of Königsberg. He carried out research on female fertility hormones (particularly progesterone) and their application as infertility treatments, obtaining a habilitation for this work in 1937. He received the rank of SS-Gruppenführer of the Reserve.

== Human experiments at Auschwitz ==
In 1942 he approached Heinrich Himmler, who knew of him through treatment of a senior SS officer's wife and asked him for an opportunity to perform mass sterilizations on women for his experiments. Himmler agreed, and in December 1942 Clauberg moved to Auschwitz concentration camp. His laboratory was in a part of the Block 10 in the main camp. Clauberg's goal was to find an easy and cheap method to sterilize women. He injected caustic substances into their uteruses without anesthetics. His test subjects were thousands of Jewish and Romani women, who either directly died or suffered permanent injuries and infections.

Himmler wanted to know how much time it would take to sterilize 1000 Jewish women. Clauberg's answer was satisfactory: One doctor with 10 assistants should be able to conduct sterilization of a few hundred, or even a few thousand, Jews in one day.

As he fled from the approaching Red Army, Clauberg moved to the Ravensbruck concentration camp, where he continued his experiments, sterilizing an estimated 700 further women.

== POW, 1945–1955 ==
When the Red Army approached the camp, Clauberg moved to Ravensbrück concentration camp to continue his experiments on Romani women. Soviet troops captured him there in 1945.

After the war in 1948, Clauberg was put on trial in the Soviet Union and was sentenced to 25 years in prison. In 1955, he was released (but not pardoned) by the Soviet Union under the Adenauer-Bulganin prisoner exchange agreement, with the final group of about 10,000 POWs and civilian internees.

== Medical career, arrest and death, 1955–1957 ==
He returned to South Germany, where he was reinstated at his former clinic based on his prewar scientific output. Bizarre behavior, including openly boasting of his "achievements" in "developing a new sterilization technique at the Auschwitz concentration camp", destroyed any chance he might have had of staying unnoticed. In 1955, after public outcry from groups of survivors, Clauberg was arrested. He died before trial on 9 August 1957 in Kiel, Germany.

== Clauberg test ==
The Clauberg test is an obsolete bioassay to assess progestational activity based on the conversion of proliferative endometrium to secretory endometrium in immature rabbits.

== See also ==
- Block 10
- Josef Mengele
- Shiro Ishii

== Bibliography ==
- Ernst Klee: Auschwitz, die NS-Medizin und ihre Opfer. 3. Auflage. S. Fischer Verlag, Frankfurt am Main, 1997, ISBN 3-596-14906-1.
- Alexander Mitscherlich, Fred Mielke: Medizin ohne Menschlichkeit: Dokumente des Nürnberger Ärzteprozesses, 1. Aufl., Heidelberg: Fischer 1960. ISBN 3-596-22003-3, Taschenbuch wird 2008 in der 16. Auflage vertrieben.
- Jürgen Peter: Der Nürnberger Ärzteprozeß im Spiegel seiner Aufarbeitung anhand der drei Dokumentensammlungen von Alexander Mitscherlich und Fred Mielke. Münster 1994. 2. Auflage 1998.
- Till Bastian: Furchtbare Ärzte. Medizinische Verbrechen im Dritten Reich. Originalausgabe, 3. Auflage, Verlag C. H. Beck, München 2001, Becksche Reihe; Band 1113, ISBN 3-406-44800-3.
- R. J. Lifton, The Nazi Doctors. Medical Killing and the Psychology of Genocide. New York 1986), ISBN 3-608-93121-X.
- Hermann Langbein: Menschen in Auschwitz. Frankfurt am Main, Berlin Wien, Ullstein-Verlag, 1980, ISBN 3-548-33014-2.
- Hans-Joachim Lang: Die Frauen von Block 10. Medizinische Experimente in Auschwitz. Hamburg 2011. ISBN 978-3-455-50222-0.
