= Hans Delmotte =

Belgian SS officer (1917–1945)

Hans Delmotte (15 December 1917, in Liège – 1945) was a Nazi SS doctor at the Auschwitz concentration camp in the branch of the Hygiene Institute of the Waffen-SS. He came from Liège, Belgium.

Initially he refused to take part in selections, allegedly going as far as to tell his superiors "You can send me to the front or gas me myself, but I won't do it." By the late fall of 1944 he finally was persuaded to take part in selections. For Delmotte's dissertation, he reserved a Jewish prisoner doctor and professor to assist him. For this research, Delmotte took part in typhus experiments on prisoners at Auschwitz. Delmotte's dissertation entitled "Contributions to pathological physiology of gastric secretion in typhoid fever" was already completed in 1944.

After the evacuation of Auschwitz in January 1945, Delmotte briefly continued to work in Dachau concentration camp.

While trying to make his way back to Belgium, he was arrested by U.S. Army soldiers. During the transfer to a prison, Delmotte had somehow managed to shoot himself, he instantly died from his gunshot wound.

== Literature ==
- Ernst Klee: Auschwitz, die NS-Medizin und ihre Opfer. 3. Auflage. S. Fischer Verlag, Frankfurt am Main, 1997, ISBN 3-596-14906-1.
- Ernst Klee: Das Personenlexikon zum Dritten Reich: Wer war was vor und nach 1945. Fischer-Taschenbuch-Verlag, Frankfurt am Main 2007. ISBN 978-3-596-16048-8
- Hermann Langbein: People in Auschwitz, Frankfurt am Main, Berlin, Wien: Ullstein, 1980; ISBN 3-548-33014-2.
- Wacław Długoborski, Franciszek Piper (Hrsg.): Auschwitz 1940-1945. Studies on the History of the Concentration Camp and Death Camp Auschwitz. Verlag Staatliches Museum Auschwitz-Birkenau, Oswiecim 1999, ISBN 83-85047-76-X.
- Mieczysław Kieta: The Hygiene Institute of the Waffen SS in Auschwitz: Hamburger Institut für Sozialforschung (Hrsg.): Die Auschwitz-Hefte, Band 1, Hamburg, 1994; ISBN 3-8077-0282-2.
