= Sigmund Rascher =

German Schutzstaffel (SS) doctor (1909–1945)

- Rascher posing with one of the children kidnapped by his wife
- Born: 12 February 1909; Munich, Bavaria, German Empire
- Died: 26 April 1945 (aged 36); Dachau concentration camp, Dachau, Nazi Germany
- Cause of death: Execution by shooting
- SS paramilitary career
- Allegiance: Nazi Germany
- Branch: Schutzstaffel
- Service years: 1936–1945
- Rank: SS-Hauptsturmführer

Sigmund Rascher (12 February 1909 – 26 April 1945) was a German Schutzstaffel (SS) doctor. He conducted deadly experiments on humans pertaining to high altitude, freezing and blood coagulation under the patronage of Reichsführer-SS Heinrich Himmler, to whom his wife Karoline "Nini" Diehl had direct connections. When police investigations uncovered that the couple had defrauded the public with their supernatural fertility by 'hiring' and kidnapping babies, she and Rascher were arrested in April 1944. He was accused of financial irregularities, murder of his former lab assistant, and scientific fraud, and brought to Buchenwald and Dachau concentration camps before being executed. After his death, the Nuremberg trials judged his experiments as inhumane and criminal.

== Early life ==
Sigmund Rascher was born in Munich on 12 February 1909, the third child of Hanns-August Rascher (1880–1952) a physician and avid follower of Rudolf Steiner. Therefore, Rascher attended the first Waldorf School in Stuttgart, a school based on Steiner's anthroposophist approach to education. He came under the influence of Ehrenfried Pfeiffer, who believed in the influence of cosmic rhythms on life processes. He completed his secondary education, the German Abitur in Konstanz in 1930 or 1931—he used both dates.

== Education and Party membership ==
In 1933, he began to study medicine in Munich, where he also joined the Nazi Party. The exact day of his joining is uncertain: Rascher insisted that it was on 1 March, whereas documents show 1 May. This is relevant because the first date is 4 days before the Nazi victory in the March 1933 German federal election, whereas the second date is after Hitler had consolidated power on 23 March with his Enabling Act.

After his medical internship, Rascher worked with his now-divorced father in Basel, Switzerland, and continued his medical studies there, joining the Swiss Voluntary Work Forces. In 1934, he returned to Munich to finish his studies, and received his doctorate in 1936. In May 1936, Rascher joined the Sturmabteilung (SA). From 1936 to 1938 Rascher worked on cancer diagnostics, supported by a DFG stipend under Prof. Trumpp in Munich. Until 1939 he was an assistant physician at Munich's hospital Schwabinger Krankenhaus.

== Career with the SS ==
In 1939, Rascher transferred to the SS with the rank of Private. That same year, Rascher denounced his father, and was conscripted into the Luftwaffe. A relationship with and eventual marriage to former singer Karoline "Nini" Diehl gained him direct access to Reichsführer-SS Heinrich Himmler. Rascher's connection with Himmler gave him immense influence, even over his superiors. Though it is unclear as to the precise nature of Diehl's connection to Himmler, she frequently corresponded with him and interceded with him on her husband's behalf; it is suggested that Diehl may have been a former lover of Himmler's.

A week after first meeting Himmler, Rascher presented a paper, "Report on the Development and Solution to Some of the Reichsfuehrer's Assigned Tasks During a Discussion Held on April 24, 1939". Rascher became involved in testing a plant extract as a cancer treatment. Kurt Blome, deputy of the Reich Health Leader and Plenipotentiary for Cancer Research in the Reich Research Council, favoured testing the extract on rodents but Rascher insisted on using human test subjects. Himmler took Rascher's side and a Human Cancer Testing Station was established at Dachau. Blome worked on the project.

=== High altitude experiments ===
Rascher suggested in early 1941, while a captain in the Luftwaffe's Medical Service, that high-altitude/low-pressure experiments be carried out on human beings. While taking a course in aviation medicine at Munich, he wrote Himmler a letter in which he said that his course included research into high-altitude flight and it was regretted that no tests with humans had been possible as such experiments were highly dangerous and nobody volunteered for them. Rascher asked Himmler to place human subjects at his disposal, stating quite frankly that the experiments might prove fatal, but that previous tests made with monkeys had been unsatisfactory. The letter was answered by Rudolf Brandt, Himmler's adjutant, who informed Rascher that prisoners would be made available.

Rascher subsequently wrote back to Brandt, asking for permission to carry out his experiments at Dachau, and plans for the experiments were developed at a conference in early 1942 attended by Rascher and members of the Luftwaffe Medical Service. The experiments were carried out in the spring and summer of the same year, using a portable pressure chamber supplied by the Luftwaffe. The victims were locked in the chamber, the interior pressure of which was then lowered to a level corresponding to very high altitudes. The pressure could be very quickly altered, allowing Rascher to simulate the conditions which would be experienced by a pilot freefalling from altitude without oxygen. After viewing a report of one of the fatal experiments, Himmler remarked that if a subject should survive such treatment, he should be "pardoned" to life imprisonment. Rascher replied to Himmler that the victims had to date been merely Poles and Soviets, and that he believed they should be given no amnesty of any sort. 80 out of the 200 subjects died outright because of the experiment and the rest were murdered.

=== Freezing experiments ===
Rascher also conducted so-called "freezing experiments" on behalf of the Luftwaffe on 300 test subjects without their consent. American investigators later concluded that Rascher had been merely a convenient front for Luftwaffe chief surgeon Erich Hippke, who had been the true source of the ideas for Rascher's experiments. The experiments were conducted at Dachau after the high-altitude experiments had concluded. The purpose was to determine the best way of warming German pilots who had been forced down in the North Sea and suffered hypothermia. Rascher's victims were forced to remain outdoors naked in freezing weather for up to 14 hours, or kept in a tank of icewater for three hours, their pulse and internal temperature measured through a series of electrodes. Warming of the victims was then attempted by different methods, most usually and successfully by immersion in hot water; at least one witness, an assistant to some of these procedures, later testified that some victims were thrown into boiling water for rewarming.

Himmler attended some of the experiments, and told Rascher he should go to the North Sea region and find out how ordinary people there warmed victims of extreme cold. Himmler reportedly said he thought "that a fisherwoman could well take her half-frozen husband into her bed and revive him in that manner" and added that everyone believed "animal warmth" had a different effect than artificial warmth. Four Romani women were sent from Ravensbrück concentration camp and warming was attempted by placing the hypothermic victim between two naked women.

In October 1942, results of the experiments were presented at a medical conference in Nuremberg in two presentations named "Prevention and Treatment of Freezing", and "Warming Up After Freezing to the Danger Point".

Rascher, who had by now been transferred to the Waffen-SS, was eager to obtain the academic credentials necessary for a high-level university position. A habilitation which was to be based on his research failed, however, at Munich, Marburg, and Frankfurt, due to the formal requirement that results be made available for public scrutiny.

Similar experiments were conducted from July to September 1944, as the Ahnenerbe provided space and materials to doctors at Dachau to undertake "seawater experiments", chiefly through Wolfram Sievers. While working in Dachau, Rascher developed the standard cyanide capsules, which could be easily bitten through, either deliberately or accidentally. From the 300 prisoners that were used as test subjects for the experiments, 90 of them died.

=== Blood coagulation experiments ===
Rascher experimented with the effects of Polygal, a substance made from beet and apple pectin, which aided blood clotting. He predicted that the preventive use of Polygal tablets would reduce bleeding from gunshot wounds sustained during combat or during surgery. Subjects were given a Polygal tablet and shot through the neck or chest, or their limbs amputated without anaesthesia. Rascher published an article on his experience of using Polygal without detailing the nature of the human trials and also set up a company to manufacture the substance, staffed by prisoners.

== Personal life and execution ==
Attempting to please Himmler through demonstrating that population growth could be accelerated by extending female childbearing age, Rascher publicized the fact that his wife, Karoline, had given birth to three children even after reaching 48 years of age, and Himmler used a photograph of Rascher's family as propaganda material. However, during her fourth "pregnancy", Karoline Rascher was arrested by the Kriminalpolizei while attempting to kidnap a baby. An investigation later revealed that her other three children had been either purchased or kidnapped.

In addition to acting as an accessory in the kidnappings of the three infants, Rascher was also accused of financial irregularities, the murder of his former lab assistant, and scientific fraud. In December 1943, Rascher's lab assistant and housekeeper, Julie Muschler, disappeared while on a mountain trip with the couple. When her body was found in April 1944, both Raschers came under strong suspicion of murder. Muschler had once lived in an apartment with the Raschers.

Himmler, enraged that the Raschers had exploited him, had both of them sent without trial to concentration camps. Sigmund was sent to Buchenwald concentration camp and Karoline was sent to Ravensbrück concentration camp. Both were held in bunkers meant for special prisoners. Sigmund remained in Buchenwald following his arrest in 1944, until the camp's evacuation in April 1945. He and other prisoners were then taken to Dachau, where he was shot on 26 April 1945, three days before the camp was liberated by American troops. In another first-hand account, a fellow SS officer witnessed Rascher's execution by SS-Hauptscharführer Theodor Bongartz on Himmler's direct order by shooting him through the cell observation and food delivery door, then kicking his body with the words 'You pig, now you've got the punishment you deserve'. Around the same time, Karoline was executed by hanging in Ravensbrück.

After his death, the Nuremberg trials judged his experiments as inhumane and criminal. In 1990, a thorough review of his hypothermia research revealed serious experimental flaws (beyond the ethical context) as well as evidence of the falsification of data.
