= Robert Berger (surgeon) =

Hungarian-American surgeon

Robert Laszlo Berger
- Born: September 26, 1929; Debrecen, Hungary
- Died: January 1, 2016 (aged 86); Boston, Massachusetts, United States
- Education: Harvard University; Boston University
- Children: 2
- Medical career
- Profession: Surgeon
- Institutions: Boston City Hospital, St. Elizabeth's Medical Center (Boston), Boston University School of Medicine, Beth Israel Deaconess Medical Center
- Sub-specialties: Lung volume reduction surgery
- Research: Cardiology, pulmonology, medical ethics

Robert Berger (September 26, 1929 – January 1, 2016) was a Hungarian-American surgeon specializing in cardiology and pulmonology. He is known for leading the team of physicians whose patient was the first to survive surgery to implant a partial artificial heart. A Holocaust survivor, Berger is also known for his scholarship on ethics in the medical profession during and after World War II.

== Early life and education ==
Berger was born in 1929 in Debrecen, Hungary. After being forced into hiding during the Holocaust, he eventually crossed the Atlantic and settled in Boston, where he attended Boston Latin School, Harvard University (in Cambridge), and later, the Boston University School of Medicine.

== Career ==
Berger played a leading role in numerous pioneering surgical procedures of the heart and lungs. In 1965, he assisted in the first case of a total exchange of blood in a young patient. He also broke ground in the understanding of lung volume reduction surgery, and he helped to develop that procedure.

Berger was one of the notable physicians whose work led to the development of an artificial heart. In 1978, Berger headed the team working with a patient who became the first to survive the implantation of a partial artificial heart. At the Boston University School of Medicine, Berger reported that he and his colleagues saved the life of a heart attack victim with the installation of a partial artificial heart device known as the Left Ventricular Assist Device.

Starting in 1990, Berger became an outspoken critic of academics citing the scientific experiments conducted on concentration camp prisoners in Nazi Germany. In a study he published that year, Berger argued that, despite numerous citations in the scientific literature, such experiments contained scientific inconsistencies, improper methods, and apparent data falsification.

Berger eventually became director of clinical research in the division of thoracic surgery and interventional pulmonology at Beth Israel Deaconess Medical Center in Boston.

== Personal life ==
Berger was married to a fellow doctor, Patricia Downs Berger, and had two daughters, Shana and Ilana. He died in 2016 at age 86.

I learned during the war that every material thing you have can be taken away from you, but what you have in your head is yours always.

— Robert Berger
