= Sergio De Simone =

Italian Child Holocaust victim (1937–1945)

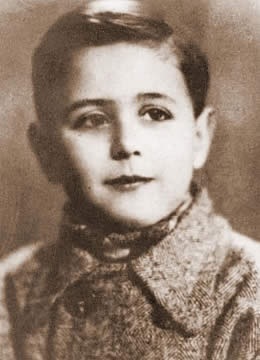
- Born: 29 November 1937; Naples, Italy
- Died: 20 April 1945 (aged 7); Bullenhuser Damm, Hamburg, Germany
- Other name: Neuengamme Concentration Camp Prisoner 179614

The story of my brother and the other 19 children... should never be silenced or merely hinted at — but rather narrated in its full and aberrant detail.

— Mario De Simone
Sergio De Simone's younger brother

My brother was murdered because he was compromising evidence.

— Mario De Simone

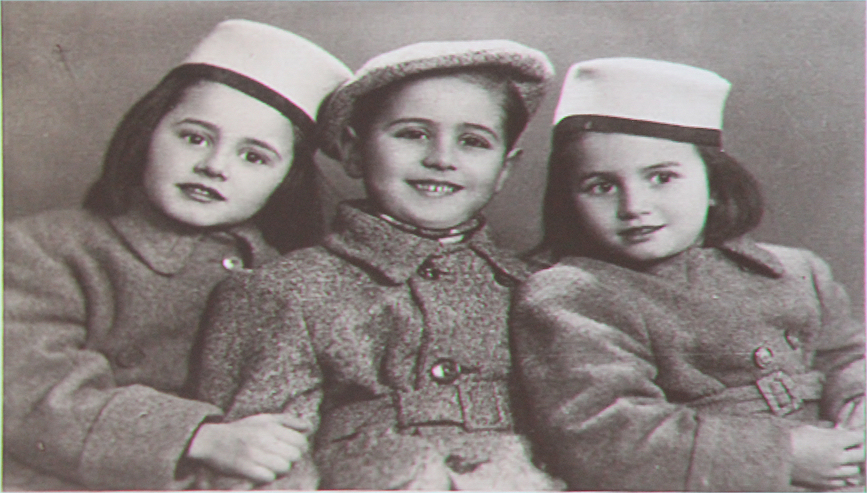
Sergio De Simone, with his cousins, sisters Andra and Tatiana Bucci

Sergio De Simone (29 November 1937 – 20 April 1945) was a Neapolitan child victim of the Holocaust who was arrested with his Jewish family while summering in Rijeka (now Croatia, then part of the Kingdom of Italy). He was then deported to Germany, where he was subjected to human experimentation and subsequently murdered.

At age seven, De Simone was one of the children of the Bullenhuser-Damm Massacre. Twenty children of disparate nationalities were selected by Joseph Mengele as human subjects for medical experimentation by Kurt Heissmeyer at the Neuengamme concentration camp near Hamburg. As the Allies closed in on Hamburg and the perpetrators sought to destroy evidence of the experimentation, all 20 children, their four adult caretakers and 24 Soviet prisoners were taken to the basement of Hamburg's Bullenhuser Damm School and murdered.

Although almost initially lost in the wake of WWII, the story and identity of the children was ultimately uncovered through the research of German journalist, Günther Schwarberg (1926-2008) and his wife, attorney Barbara Hüsing. Today the children are remembered internationally; numerous books and films document their story, as well as a foundation: Children of Bullenhuser Damm.

On the street where Sergio De Simone's family lived in Naples, a memorial plaque and a pavement Stolperstein mark his life, which is commemorated annually on 27 January International Holocaust Remembrance Day.

== Background ==
Sergio De Simone was born in the Vomero district of Naples, Italy, on 29 November 1937 to Eduardo De Simone (unknown-1964), a Catholic, non-commissioned officer in the Italian Navy and Gisella Perlow. De Simone's mother, of Jewish origin, was born on 23 September 1904 in Vidrinka, a town that no longer exists (possibly in Belarus, though more likely, Ukraine). The two met in Rijeka (on the Istrian Peninsula of what then belonged to the Kingdom of Italy), where Perlow's family lived. After marrying, the couple settled in Naples, on Via Morghen, not far above Piazza Vanvitelli.

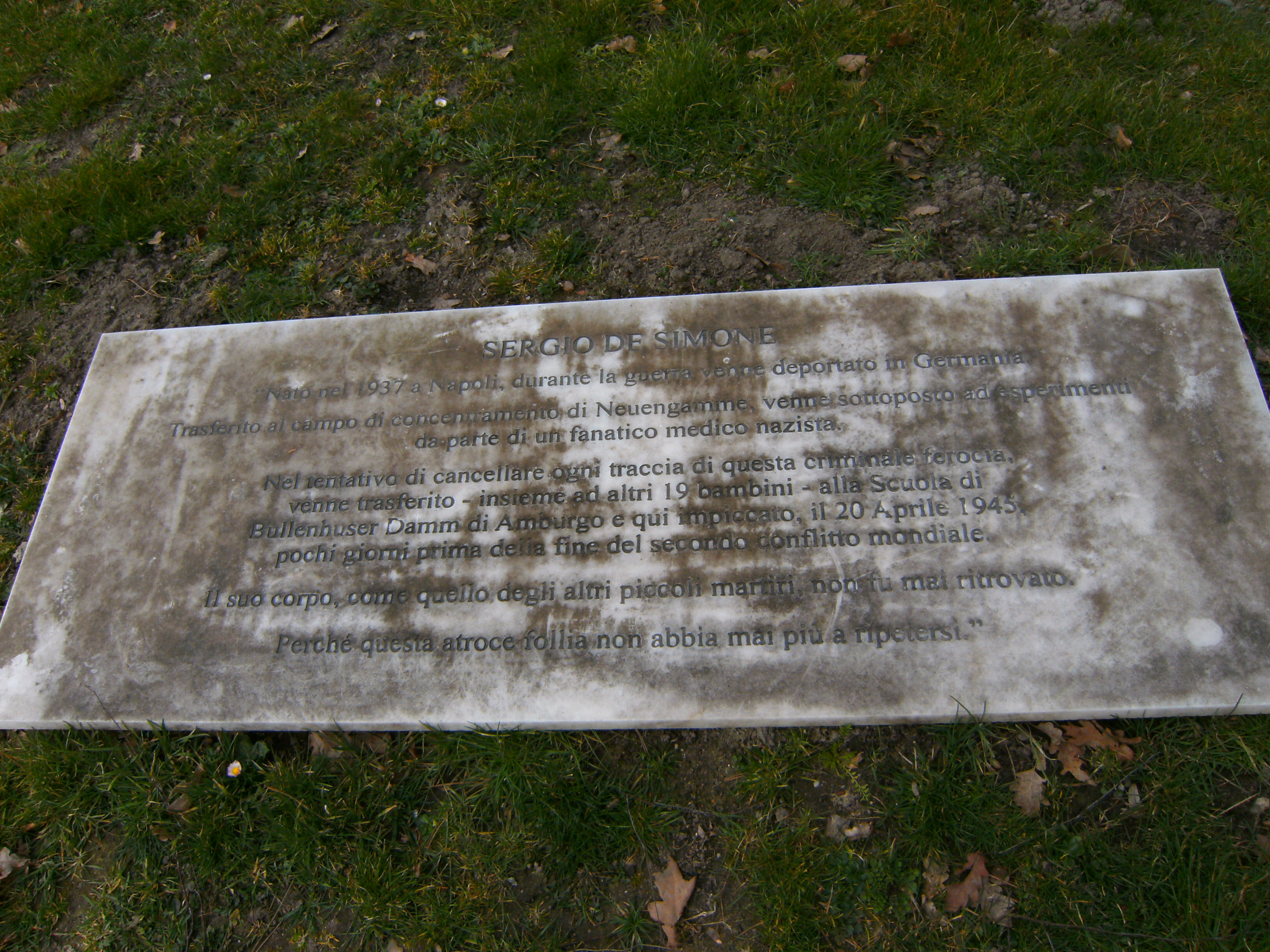
Commemoration of Sergio De Simone, at the Italian War Cemetery, Hamburg-Öjendorf Friedhof Translated: SERGIO DE SIMONE, born 1937, Napoli, deported during the war to Germany, transferred to Neuengamme concentration camp, subjected to experiments by a fanatical Nazi doctor. In an attempt to erase any trace of this criminal ferocity he was transferred together with 19 other children to the Bullenhuser Damm School in Hamburg and hanged there on 20 April 1945, a few days before the end of the Second World War. His body, like that of the other little martyrs, was never found. So that this atrocious madness may never repeat itself.

In August 1943, with her husband called to the Navy (later taken to Dortmund as slave labor) and Italy having entered the war alongside Nazi Germany, Gisella Perlow was alone with her six-year-old son in Naples, which now experienced heavy bombings and where she risked being discovered in the hunt for Jews, by Nazi-fascists. Gisella unwittingly moved to Fiume (Rijeka) with Sergio to join her mother, brothers and sisters at their home at Via Milano 17. Rijeka was, at the time, part of the Kingdom of Italy.

Almost immediately, by September, Rijeka fell under German control. On 21 March 1944, betrayed by an acquaintance, Germans arrived up at the Perlow home and arrested the family, including Gisella, Sergio (then aged 6), and seven other family members, including his cousins (photo) Andra (6) and Tatiana Bucci (4). The latter would ultimately be the youngest Italian survivors of the Holocaust.

The Perlow family was taken to the Risiera di San Sabba concentration camp and immediately joined the group of deportees leaving on 29 March and arriving in Auschwitz after six days in by convoy. Gisella and Sergio survived the first selection and Sergio was assigned with his cousins in the Kinderblock (Children's hut).

Sergio's cousins Andra and Tatiana Bucci were with Sergio, had begun to understand German and had been warned that the guards could exploit the children's greatest vulnerability: they would line up the children and ask those who wanted to see their mother to step forward. In this way, the experimenters could easily walk their subjects away without resistance. The sisters had warned Sergio, but with a single step he had unknowingly volunteered as one of Joseph Mengele's human subjects. The cousins would survive.

== Neuengamme experimentation ==
Having been chosen in November 1944 by Joseph Mengele as one of the twenty children (10 boys and 10 girls) to be sent to the Neuengamme concentration camp, Sergio was made available as a human subject in Kurt Heissmeyer's tuberculosis experimentation.

As early as April 1944, Heissmeyer had conducted medical experiments on Russian POWs. As the court expert would later testify during the subsequent trials of the early 1960s, Heissmeyer had no scientific expertise or background in immunology or bacteriology, but based his work on pseudo-science, studies already considered scientifically unreliable at the time. But Heissmeyer was convinced that by injecting tuberculosis bacilli under a subject's skin, infection would form that would generate immune defense responses, leading to vaccinations against pulmonary tuberculosis. He was not discouraged by his first negative results and with influential support among the Nazi leaders, he insisted that the experiment continue, now with Jewish children.

On 29 November 1944, Sergio's seventh birthday, he and 19 other children, from France, the Netherlands, Yugoslavia, and Poland, arrived at the Neuengamme concentration camp, accompanied by Dr. Paulina Trocki and three nurses. In Neuengamme the children were entrusted to four deportees, charged with taking care of the group: the French doctors, René Quenouille and Gabriel Florence, and two Dutch nurses, Anton Hölzel and Dirk Deutekom.

For several weeks the children experienced a period of relative calm; the experiment required their good health. On 9 January 1945 Heissmeyer began the experiments: he had the skin on the chest of 11 children, under the right armpit, incised with X-shaped cuts, three to four centimeters long, to introduce tuberculosis bacilli with a spatula — causing rapid spread of the disease. In early March the children, sick and feverish, were operated on to remove their axillary lymph nodes, which according to the doctor's theories should have produced antibodies against tuberculosis.

A series of twenty surviving photographs document the operations; they show each child, shaven and shirtless, presenting their raised arms and their under-arm incisions. The experiment had failed: the removed lymphatic glands were sent to Hans Klein, a pathologist at the Hohenlychen clinic, who on 12 March 1945 certified to Heissmeyer that no antibodies had been generated.

Before leaving the extermination camp on 17 January 1945, the German SS burned all possible evidence attesting to what happened in Auschwitz-Birkenau. Sergio's name appears in a rare exception, a medical report, one of the few documents not destroyed. The document, dated 14 May 1944, confirmed the presence of the children of Bullenhuser Damm.

== Bullenhuser Damm Massacre ==
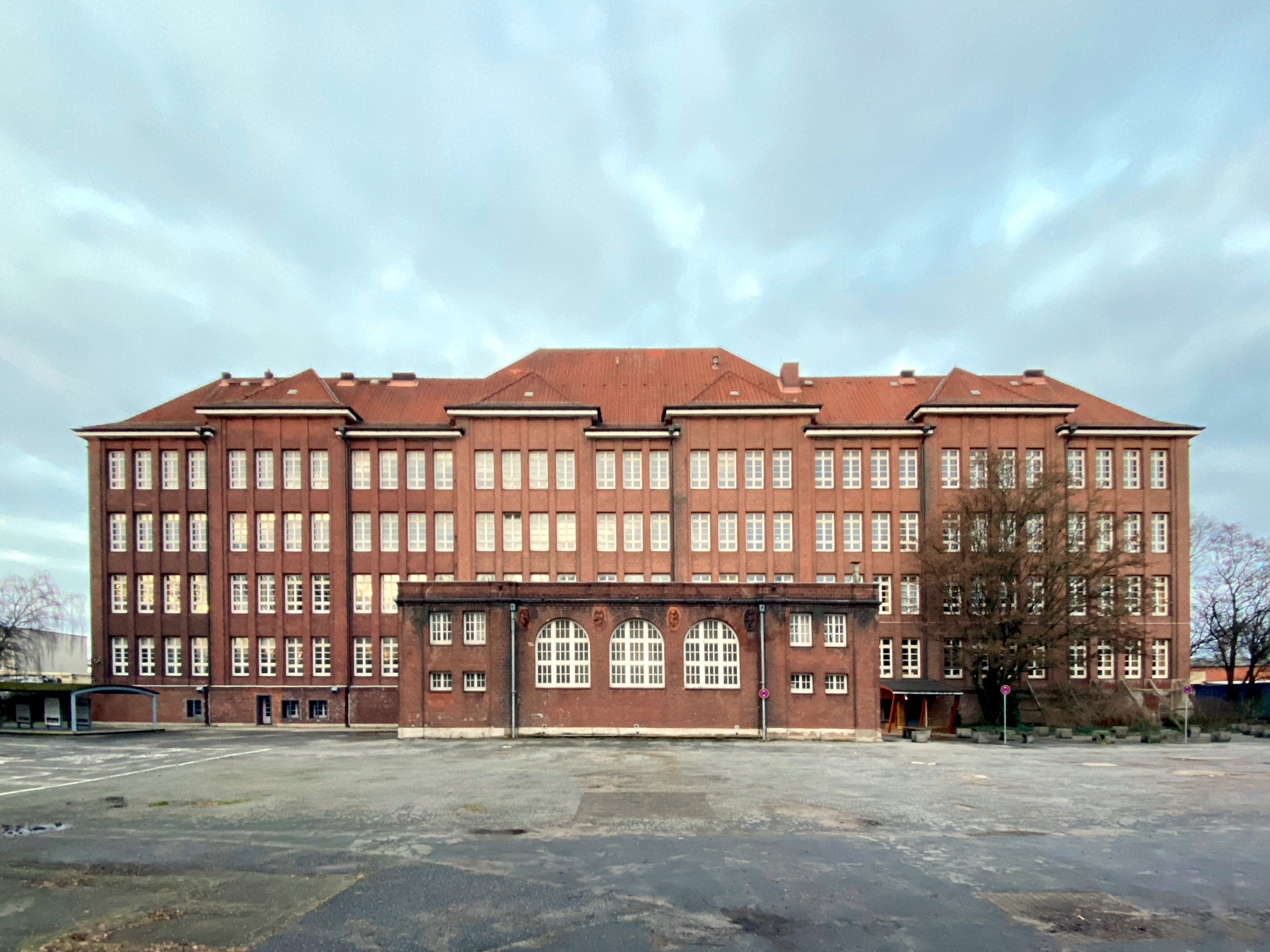
The Bullenhuser Damm school, site of the massacre

By the time his experiments failed and news traveled that the Allies were fast approaching, Heissmeyer had fled. The camp commander Max Pauly was left to deal with the children. On the evening of 20 April, orders came directly from Berlin to eliminate all trace of what had transpired in Neuengamme.

At 10pm on the evening of 20 April, the children, their four adult caretakers and several Soviet prisoners were loaded into a mail truck and driven the approximately 30 kilometers from the Kinderblock hut 4a, the site of the experimentation, to Bullenhuser Damm — along with Wilhelm Dreimann, Adolf Speck, Heinrich Wiehagen, their executioners, so-called SS doctor Alfred Trzebinski and Johann Frahm, German SS sergeant.

Johann Frahm, German SS sergeant at Neuengamme concentration camp and deputy camp commander at the Neuengamme satellite camp on Bullenhuser Damm, reported on 2 May 1946:

The commander of the Bullenhuser Damm camp was Jauch, the executor of the orders was Strippel... I went down to the cellar where the new arrivals were gathered. There were about 20 children. Some appeared to be sick. Besides the children in the cellar were Dr. Trzebinski, Dreimann and Jauch. Strippel came and went. The children had to undress in a cellar room, then were taken to another room, where Dr. Trzebinski gave them an injection to put them to sleep. Those who still showed signs of life after the injection were taken to another room. A rope was put around their necks and they were hung on a hook. This was done by Jauch, myself, Trzebinski and Dreimann. When asked by Captain Walter Freud "How did he hang them?" Frahm replied "Wie Bilder an die Wand" (like pictures on the wall).

Eleven months later at the British Curiohaus Trials in Rotherbaum in March 1946, Trzebinski testified:

The children suspected absolutely nothing. I wanted at least to relieve them of the last ones me hours. I had morphine with me... I called the children one at a time... I gave them the injection on the buttock, where it is least painful. In order for them to believe it was really a vaccination, I changed the needle after each injection. The dose was supposed to get them to sleep. I must say that the children were in a pretty good state, except for a 12-year-old who was quite sick. This baby fell asleep right away. There were six or eight still awake, the others were asleep... Frahm took the 12-year-old in his arms and said to the others: 'He will be put to bed'. He took him to another room, about six or eight meters from the one where the children were, and there I saw that there was already a rope on a hook. On this rope Frahm hung the sleeping child, then he hung himself with all the weight of his body on the child's body so that the rope would close and hang him...

The massacre ended at dawn on the morning of April 21, with the killing of eight other Russian prisoners. The bodies were brought back to the Neuengamme concentration camp and cremated.

== De Simone Family aftermath ==
Sergio's parents, Eduardo De Simone and Gisella Perlow De Simone survived the war. Sergio's mother had also been deported to Auschwitz and sent in the spring of 1945 to the Ravensbrück concentration camp, where she was released. Gravely ill, she was only able to return to Italy in November 1945 and reunite with Eduardo, who after 8 September had also been deported to the Dortmund labor camp in Germany. Thirteen members of Gisella Perlow's family had been apprehended before the war; four survived.

His parents had searched for news of Sergio, only learning in the late 1940s that their son had been transferred from Auschwitz to another camp. Gisella and her husband would have another son, Mario De Simone, born in 1946.

In the 1980s, around the time the story of the Bullenhuser Damm Massacre began to emerge, Sergio's mother began receiving letters from Hamburg, dismissing them because she didn't read German. In 1983, after the death of Sergio's father in 1964, his mother was informed of the massacre. Mario De Simone later related that on learning of the atrocities, his mother — who had clung to the possibility of Sergio's survival — was deeply affected; her entire affect changed. She attended the memorial ceremony on 20 April 1984 in Hamburg and died in 1986, less than two years from learning of the Neuengamme experimentation and the Bullenhuser-Damm Massacre. Sergio's younger brother continues to advocate for human rights. In 2019, he said "my brother was murdered because he was compromising evidence."

Sergio's two cousins, sisters Anda and Tatiana (Tati) Bucci, survived and were initially relocated to Lingfield in England via Prague. In 2020, the sisters authored their story Storia di Sergio with Alessandra Viola. His two cousins describe Sergio's death "like a boulder that weighs inside us."

== Legacy ==
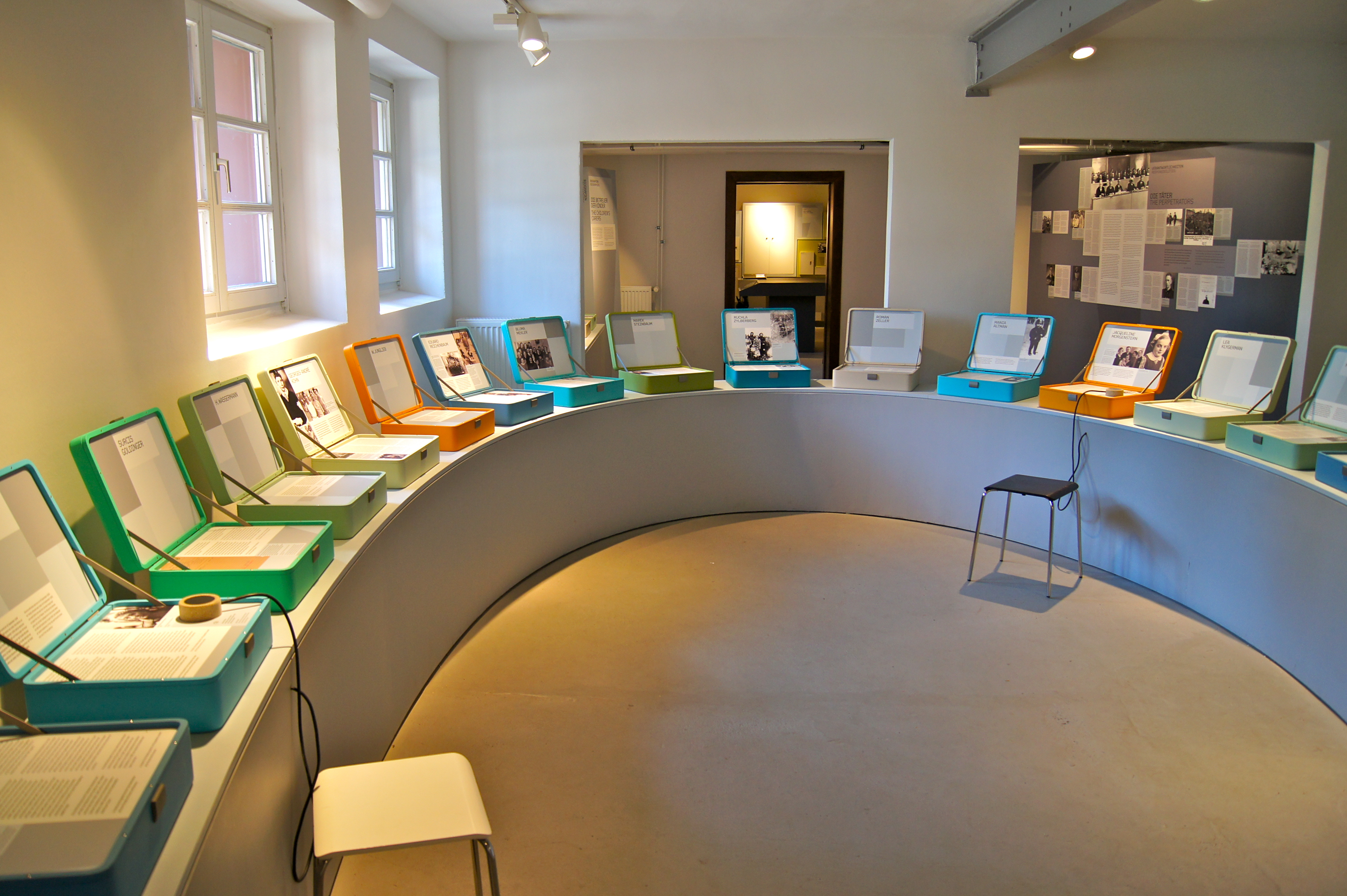
Museum at The Bullenhuser Damm School, dedicated to the victims of the massacre.

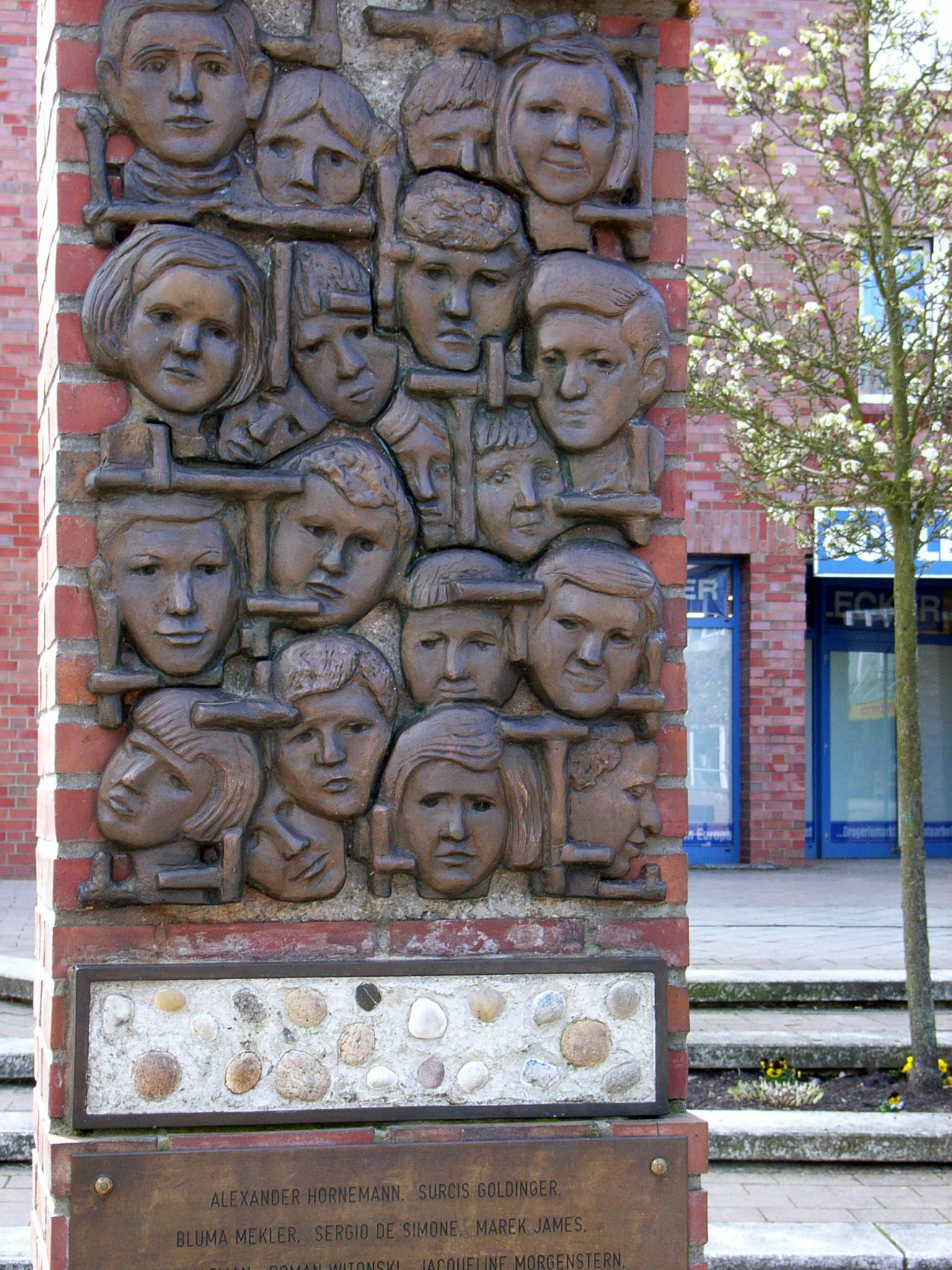
Bronze Relief Stele Commemorating the 20 Children of the Bullenhuser Damm Massacre Bronze relief stele, mounted on brick pilaster; below the relief: listing of the children's names; artist: Leonid Mogilevski (Russian, 1931-); bronze: 0.30m wide 0.60m high; placed 13 July 2001; initiative by and paid for by Hamburg citizens (with Kunststiftung Heinrich Stegemann); marked with an annual commemoration on 20 April. Location: Roman-Zeller-Platz Hamburg-Schnelsen Burgwedel A-Bahn stop 53°38′48.9″N 9°54′37.3″E

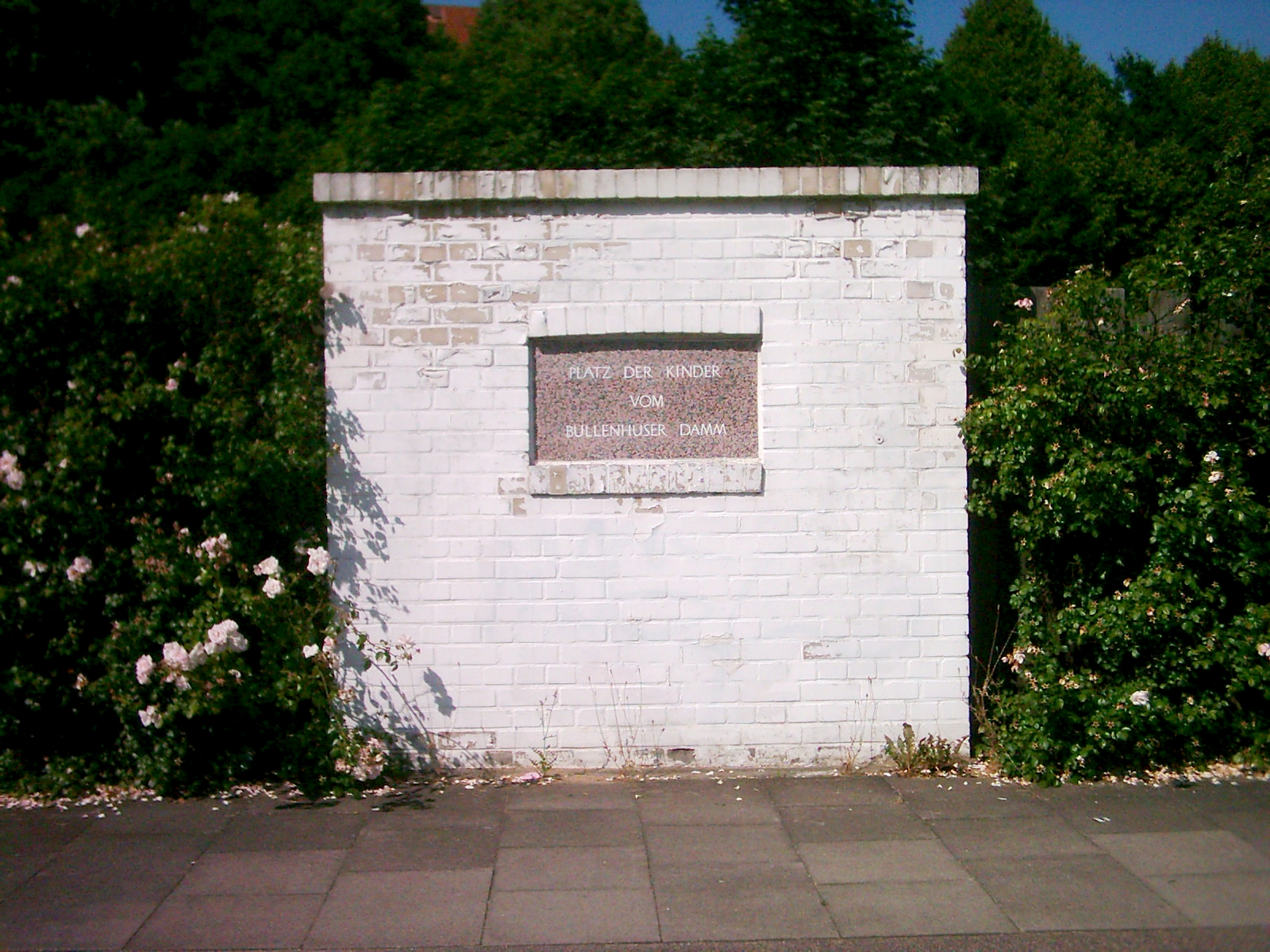
Commemorative Marker, the Place of Children of Bullenhuser Damm at the site of the Bullenhuser Damm Massacre, 20 April 1945 in Hamburg, Germany

In April 1946 the main material perpetrators of the massacre, including Commander Max Pauly, who gave the final orders, were tried by an English court and sentenced to death, carried out in October 1946. Although the responsibilities of Kurt Heissmeyer were brought to light in the trial, the German doctor was not indicted because he was not present at the massacre; he would continue his medical career unimpeded.

Though a small group of ex-Neuengamme fellow prisoners continued to bring flowers each year to Bullenhuser Damm, collective memory of the massacre itself had almost been lost. After 1945, the Bullenhuser Damm building reopened as a school, without mention of the basement massacre. In 1959, German journalist Günther Schwarberg published a series of articles dedicated to the massacre in the weekly Stern, implicating Heissmeyer. The reopening of the trial in 1963 led to Heissmeyer's life sentence in 1966. He died of a heart attack the following year in Bautzen prison.

Obersturmbannführer Arnold Strippel, the highest-ranking Nazi criminal involved in child murder, was sentenced to life imprisonment in 1949, but was released in 1969 and even received around 120,000 marks in compensation. He died a free man in 1994.

With his wife, attorney Barbara Hüsing, Schwarberg began the task of identifying and tracing the relatives of the murdered children, creating in 1979 the Association of the Children of Bullenhuser Damm. From 1979, the association Children of Bullenhuser Damm underwrote the memorial for the victims of the massacre, until it was transferred to municipal sponsorship in 1999 and became a branch of the Neuengamme concentration camp memorial.

In 1980 (expanded in 2010–11), the cellar at the Bullenhuser Damm School was made a Holocaust museum, where the other children and adult victims of the massacre are commemorated.

=== Hamburg-Schnelsen ===
In 1991, 20 streets in the Schnelsen Burgwedel district of Hamburg were named after the children, including a street near Wassermann Park Sergio De Simone Stieg, as well as a kindergarten, playground, and park.

The park, Wassermannpark, is named after the eight-year old Polish victim, known only as H. Wassermann. Wassermannpark was completed in 1995, includes 28 hectares of water features, cycle paths, picnic areas, and playgrounds.

Roman-Zeller-Platz is named after one of the 20 children of Bullenhusen Damm. A masonry stele was erected on 13 July 2001, with a bronze relief of children by Russian artist Leonid Mogilevski (1931-). The stele was an initiative by, and paid for by, Hamburg citizens with underwriting by Kunststiftung Heinrich Stegemann. Citizens of Hamburg attend the commemoration ceremony on 20 April every year.

Schnelsen/Burgwedel Stele: 53°38′48.9″N 9°54′37.3″E

=== Italy and Naples ===
In Italy, the story became widely known after with a series of publications by Maria Pia Bernicchia and Bruno Maida (see Bibliography). In 2006 a documentary retraced the story.

In the Vomero district of Naples, Italy, in front of the building where Sergio's family lived at Via Morghen 65 bis (at Via Bonito), a plaque marks Sergio's life and story.

Vomero Historic Marker, Via Morghen: 40°50′41.9″N 14°14′03.7″E

On 27 January 2014 an annual Remembrance Day was inaugurated in Naples in his memory, in conjunction with International Holocaust Remembrance Day.

In 2020, a small engraved memorial Stolperstein or stumbling block (Italian: pietra d'inciampo) was laid at Piazza Bovio (at the Naples Royal Hospital for the Poor), marking those deported to concentration camps during the war, and including a block for Sergio.

In 2022, a small engraved memorial Stolperstein or stumbling block (Italian: pietra d'inciampo) was inlaid in front of his family's Vomero residence, in a ceremony attended by Sergio's younger brother Mario de Simone (born in 1946, after the war).

A street in Naples, near the Royal Palace of Capodimonte, is named after Sergio De Simone.

=== La Stella by Andra and Tati ===
Presented on 13 April 2018 in Turin, the animated feature La Stella by Andra and Tati was dedicated to the deportation of the Bucci sisters, Sergio's two cousins, to Auschwitz — becoming the first European animated film on the Holocaust. Focusing on his two cousins, the feature includes Sergio, up until he was separated from his cousins.

Debuting on the occasion of the 80th anniversary of the fascist racial laws in Italy, the 30-minute film, directed by Rosalba Vitellaro and Alessandro Belli, was presented at the International Animation Festival on the Bay, held in 2018 in the Piedmontese capital.

=== Kinderblock ===
Kinderblock: the Last Deception, is a 54-minute film, documenting the story of Kinderblock (the "children's block") and the massacre of Sergio, his cousins Andra and Tatiana and the children of Bullenhuser Damm.

=== Santobono Pediatric Hospital, Naples ===
On 9 February 2021, the emergency room of the Santobono Children's Hospital in Naples was named after Sergio de Simone. At the ceremony, the emergency room was declared "a place where help and care is offered to all children, regardless of their condition and creed. It takes on greater symbolic value to remember those who were denied this and for whom the most humane of the practices, the care of the little ones, was transformed into."

== See also ==
- The Holocaust in Italy
- Children in the Holocaust
- Association of the Children of Bullenhuser-Damm

== Bibliography ==
- Storia di Sergio: Andra and Tatiana Bucci, with Alessandra Viola (2020). Storia di Sergio. Milano: Rizzoli. ISBN 978-88-171-4454-4. Archived from the original on 2022-01-27.
- La Shoah dei bambini: Maida, Bruno (2020). Einaudi (ed.). La Shoah dei bambini. Torino: Einaudi. ISBN 978-88-06-24297-8.
- Who wants to see their mother, take a step forward: The 20 children of Bullenhuser Damm: Bernicchia, Maria Pia (2014). Chi vuole vedere la mamma faccia un passo avanti: I 20 bambini di Bullenhuser Damm. Milano: Proedi. ISBN 978-88-97350-25-5.
- Better Not to Know: Marrone, Titti (2003). Meglio Non Sapere. Laterza. ISBN 9788858118252.
- Günther Schwarberg (1979–80) The SS Doctor and the Children : Haller, Daniel (2003). Günther Schwarberg (1979-80) Der SS-Arzt und die Kinder. Hamburg: Hg. Henri Nannen Gruner und Jahr. ISBN 9788858118252.
