= Georges André Kohn =

Victim of the Holocaust

Photograph of Georges André Kohn taken at his Confirmation

Georges André Kohn (23 April 1932 – 20 April 1945) was a distant relative of the Rothschild banking family of England. His father Armand Edouard Kohn (1894–1962) was the manager of the Rothschild Hospital in Paris, and his mother Suzanne Jenny (née Netre; 1895–1945) was a first cousin of Bertrand Léopold Goldschmidt, son-in-law of Lionel Nathan de Rothschild. Georges André's father was Jewish but he, his mother and his elder brother and sisters were practicing Roman Catholics.

Georges and his family were arrested in the last week of July 1944; they were among a group of prominent Jews who had previously been awarded protective status in occupied France. Georges was among a group of fifty-one people deported in the last transport from the Drancy transit camp in France on 17 August 1944, a week prior to the liberation of Paris, along with his parents, grandmother Jeanne Marie (75), sisters Antoinette (22) and Rose Marie (18) and brother Philippe (21).

The railroad car they were deported in was attached to the end of the last train out of Drancy which also carried Drancy commandant SS Hauptsturmführer Alois Brunner and other German military personnel. They intended upon using the fifty-one Jewish deportees as potential hostages.

On the train ride east to the camps some of the prisoners escaped including Rose-Marie and Phillipe Kohn. Georges wanted to go along with them but was stopped by his father who feared reprisals for the escapes on those who remained. Armand went to Buchenwald and would survive the war, Suzanne and Antoinette were transported from Buchenwald to Bergen-Belsen where both died a short while later; Jeanne Marie and Georges were sent to Auschwitz-Birkenau, where Jeanne Marie was gassed shortly after arrival. Georges was placed in Barracks No. 11, with other Jewish children. He quickly befriended Jacqueline Morgenstern who was close in age, was from France and also spoke French. Armand, Phillippe, and Rose Marie survived the war.

Georges was among a group of twenty Jewish children chosen at the behest of Kurt Heissmeyer by Josef Mengele to be sent from Auschwitz to Neuengamme concentration camp for medical experiments.

At Neuengamme, Georges and the other children, nine other boys and ten girls, from ages five to twelve, were infected with live tuberculosis bacilli by Heissmeyer.

They all later had their axillary lymph nodes surgically removed for study. In April 1945 the British Army was advancing through Lower Saxony toward the location of Neuengamme and the city of Hamburg. As the medical experiments conducted on the children would be grounds for being charged with war crimes, an order was issued from Berlin to dispose of the evidence, which included killing Georges and the other children.

Three days before his thirteenth birthday, on the night of 20 April 1945, Georges and the other children were brought to the Bullenhuser Damm School in Hamburg and hanged in the basement. His body was brought back to Neuengamme the next day and they were cremated.
