= Alois Brunner =

Austrian war criminal (1912–2001/2010)

- Brunner in 1940
- Born: 8 April 1912; Nádkút, Austria-Hungary
- Died: December 2001 (aged 88–89) or 2010 (aged 97–98); Damascus, Syria
- Resting place: Al-Affif cemetery
- Known for: Eichmann's right-hand man; Commander of the Drancy internment camp; Arms trafficking
- Conviction: Crimes against humanity
- Penalty: Death (1954) (in absentia); Life imprisonment (2001) (in absentia)
- SS service
- Allegiance: Nazi Germany
- Branch: Schutzstaffel
- Service years: 1932–1945
- Rank: SS-Hauptsturmführer
- Commands: Drancy internment camp

Alois Brunner (8 April 1912 – December 2001 or 2010) was an Austrian officer who held the rank of SS-Hauptsturmführer (captain) during World War II. Brunner played a significant role in the implementation of the Holocaust through rounding up and deporting Jews in occupied Austria, Greece, France, and Slovakia. He was known as Final Solution architect Adolf Eichmann's right-hand man.

Brunner was responsible for sending over 100,000 European Jews from Austria, Greece, France and Slovakia to ghettos and concentration camps in eastern Europe. At the start of the war, he oversaw the deportation of 47,000 Austrian Jews to camps. In Greece, 43,000 Jews were deported in two months while he was stationed in Thessaloniki. He then became commander of the Drancy internment camp outside Paris from June 1943 to August 1944, during which nearly 24,000 men, women and children were sent to the gas chambers. His last assignment involved the destruction of the Jewish community of Slovakia. After some narrow escapes from the Allies in the immediate aftermath of World War II, Brunner managed to elude capture and fled West Germany in 1954, first for Egypt, then Syria, where he remained until his death.

In Syria, Brunner was granted asylum by the Ba'athist regime and assisted Hafez al-Assad in organizing the Ba'athist secret police, training them on Nazi torture practices. Brunner was the object of many manhunts, investigations, and assassination attempts over the years by different groups, including the Simon Wiesenthal Center, the Klarsfelds, and Mossad. In 1954, he was convicted in absentia in France for crimes against humanity and sentenced to death, later commuted to life imprisonment in 2001 (France had abolished the death penalty in 1981). In Syria, he lost an eye and then the fingers of his left hand as a result of letter bombs sent to him in 1961 and 1980, reportedly by Israeli intelligence.

Starting in the 1990s and continuing for two decades, Brunner was one of the most-wanted Nazi war criminals. In November 2014, the Simon Wiesenthal Center reported that Brunner had died in Syria in 2010, and that he was buried somewhere in Damascus. However, a 2017 French investigation stated that evidence pointed to December 2001 as the time of his death in Damascus. The German intelligence agency Bundesamt für Verfassungsschutz (BfV) disputed this conclusion, reaffirming his death in 2010. Brunner's exact date and place of death remain unknown.

== Early life ==
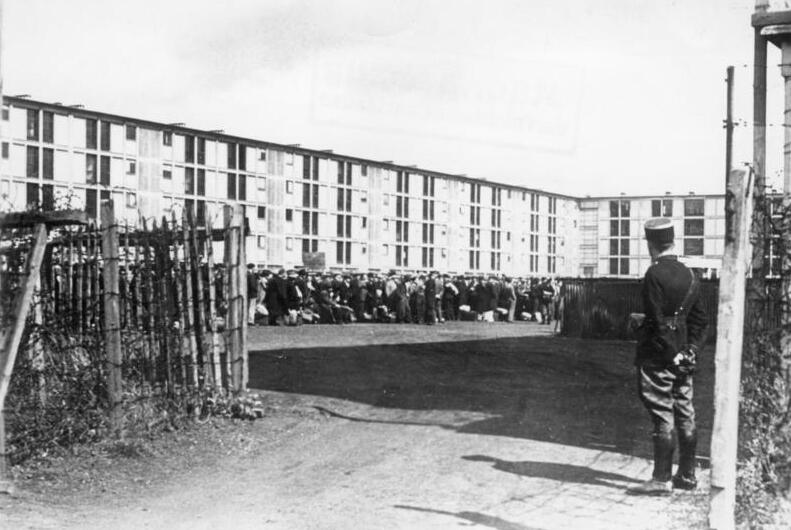
Drancy camp in the outskirts of Paris

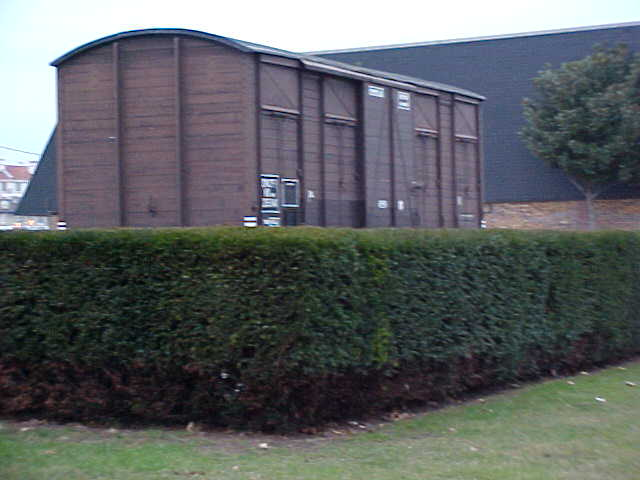
The railway wagon used to carry internees to Auschwitz and now displayed at Drancy

Alois Brunner was born on 8 April 1912 in the town of Vas, Austria-Hungary (now Rohrbrunn, Burgenland, Austria), the son of Joseph Brunner and Ann Kruise. He joined the Nazi Party at the age of sixteen and the Sturmabteilung (SA) a year later. In 1933, Brunner moved to Germany where he joined the Nazi paramilitary group Austrian Legion. After the annexation of Austria in 1938, he volunteered with the SS and was assigned to the staff of the Central Office for Jewish Emigration in Vienna, becoming its director in 1939. Following the German occupation of the Czech lands on 15 March 1939, he was sent to the Protectorate of Bohemia and Moravia to accelerate the emigration of Czech Jews. Brunner became known as Adolf Eichmann's right-hand man.

== Second World War ==
After the war started Brunner worked closely with Eichmann on the Nisko Plan, a failed attempt to set up a Jewish reservation in Poland, managing by October 1939 to organize the deportation of more than 1,500 Viennese Jews to Nisko, Poland. Over time Brunner supervised the deportation of 56,000 Austrian Jews. In October 1942, he was transferred to Berlin to implement his method there. Brunner held the rank of SS-Hauptsturmführer (captain) when he organized deportations to Nazi concentration camps from Vichy France and Slovakia. He was commander of a train of Jews deported from Vienna to Riga in February 1942. En route, Brunner shot and killed Jewish financier Siegmund Bosel, who, although ill, had been hauled out of a Vienna hospital and placed on the train. According to historian Gertrude Schneider, who as a young girl was deported to Riga on the same train, but survived the Holocaust:

Alois Brunner chained Bosel, still in his pajamas, to the platform of the first car—our car—and berated him for having been a profiteer. The old man repeatedly asked for mercy; he was very ill, and it was bitterly cold. Finally Brunner wearied of the game and shot him. Afterward, he walked into the car and asked whether anyone had heard anything. After being assured that no one had, he seemed satisfied and left.

Before being named commander of Drancy internment camp near Paris in June 1943, Brunner deported 43,000 Jews from Vienna and 46,000 from Salonika. He was personally sent by Eichmann in 1944 to Slovakia to oversee the deportation of Jews. In the last days of the Third Reich, he managed to deport another 13,500 from Slovakia to Theresienstadt, Sachsenhausen, Bergen-Belsen, and Stutthof of whom a few survived; the remainder, including all the children, were sent to Auschwitz, where none are known to have survived. According to some accounts, Brunner was responsible for the deportation of 129,000 people to death camps.

While serving as the commandant at Drancy, Brunner was remembered for his exceptional brutality. He personally conducted interrogations of new prisoners, and survivors of the camp have claimed that his office was covered in bloodstains and bullet holes. He instituted torture even for slight offences. As he was personally responsible to Eichmann, he circumvented the typical chain of command that included Helmut Knochen, the Chief of the SS in Paris, and Heinz Rothke, the Jewish Affairs expert of the German police. He introduced a rigid system of categorization to control the inmates using information about their race and ethnicity derived from the interrogations. He deliberately misled prisoners about the living standards of their destinations at the extermination camps in the General Government, including Auschwitz-Birkenau. Brunner also led round-ups of Jews in the Italian Military Administration of France when the Germans assumed control in 1943 following the Armistice of Cassibile, ended all legal exemptions preventing Jews from being deported by Vichy France, and extended the deportations to Jews of French nationality. He continued deportations and arrests even as the Allies and the Free French Forces advanced towards Paris.

While the Wehrmacht was already retreating from France, Brunner had 1,327 Jewish children arrested and deported in Paris between July 20 and 24, 1944. Brunner left Paris on August 17, 1944, a week before the liberation of Paris, on the last train from the Drancy transit camp with fifty-one deported people, including Georges André Kohn (hanged at Bullenhuser Damm), and other German military personnel. His intention was to use the deportees as potential hostages.

Brunner had 23,500 Jews of all ages deported from France to the concentration camps. From 30 September 1944 to 31 March 1945 he smashed the Jewish underground movement in Slovakia and headed the Sereď concentration camp, from where he had approximately 11,500 people deported to Auschwitz, Sachsenhausen, Bergen-Belsen, and Terezín for extermination.

== Postwar flight and escape to Syria ==
In a 1985 interview with the West German magazine Bunte, Brunner described how he escaped capture by the Allies immediately after World War II. The identity of Brunner was mixed up with that of another Nazi with the same surname, Anton Brunner, who was executed for war crimes. Alois, like Josef Mengele, did not have the SS blood type tattoo, which protected his identity from detection in an Allied prison camp. Anton Brunner, who had worked in Vienna deporting Jews, was confused after the war with Alois due to the shared surname, including by historians such as Gerald Reitlinger.

Claiming he had "received official documents under a false name from American authorities", Brunner claimed he had found work as a driver for the United States Army in the period after the war.

It has been alleged that Brunner found a working relationship after World War II with the Gehlen Organization.

He fled West Germany only in 1954, on a fake Red Cross passport, first to Rome, then Egypt, where he worked as a weapons dealer, and then to the Syrian Republic (as it then was), where he took the pseudonym of Dr Georg Fischer. In Syria, he was hired as a government adviser. The exact nature of his work is unknown. Syria had long refused entry to French investigators as well as to Nazi hunter Serge Klarsfeld, who spent nearly 15 years bringing the case to court in France. Simon Wiesenthal tried unsuccessfully to trace Brunner's whereabouts. However, East Germany, led by Erich Honecker, negotiated with Syria in the late 1980s to have Brunner extradited and arrested in Berlin. The government of Syria under Hafez al-Assad was close to extraditing Brunner to East Germany, but the fall of the Berlin Wall in November 1989 severed contacts and halted the extradition plan. During his long residence in Syria, Brunner was reportedly granted asylum, a generous salary and protection by the ruling Ba'ath Party in exchange for his advice on effective torture and interrogation techniques used by Nazis in World War II.

In the Bunte interview, Brunner was quoted as saying he regrets nothing and that all of the Jews deserved their fate. In a 1987 telephone interview with Chuck Ashman, published in the Chicago Sun Times, Brunner was reported to have said: "All of [the Jews] deserved to die because they were the Devil's agents and human garbage. I have no regrets and would do it again." In a later interview with the Austrian Holocaust denier and neo-Nazi Gerd Honsik, Honsik wrote that Brunner claimed he only heard about gas chambers after the war, and that his earlier statements were about deportations.

Until the early 1990s, he lived in an apartment building at 7 Rue Haddad in the fashionable Abu Rummaneh district in Damascus, meeting with foreigners and occasionally being photographed. In the 1990s, the French Embassy received reports that Brunner was meeting regularly and having tea with former East German nationals. According to The Guardian, he was last seen alive by reliable witnesses in 1992.

In December 1999, unconfirmed reports surfaced that Brunner had died in 1996 and been buried in a Damascus cemetery. However, he was reportedly sighted at the Meridian Hotel in Damascus by German journalists that same year, where he was said to be living under police protection. The last reported sighting of him was at the Meridian Hotel in late 2001 by German journalists.

In 2011, Der Spiegel reported that the German intelligence service Bundesnachrichtendienst (BND) had destroyed its file on Brunner in the 1990s, and that remarks in remaining files contain conflicting statements as to whether Brunner had worked for the BND at some point.

== Assassination attempts ==
In 1961 and 1980, letter bombs were sent to Brunner while he was a resident in Syria. As a result of the letter bomb he received in 1961, he lost an eye, and in 1980, he lost the fingers on his left hand when the parcel blew up in his hands. A 2018 article in Newsweek by journalist Ronen Bergman disclosed that the 1961 bomb was sent by Military Intelligence Unit 188, a branch of the Israel Defense Forces (IDF), and was the first target of a new method of letter bomb that was developed for deployment against ex-Nazi scientists working for Gamal Abdel Nasser in developing missiles targeting Israel. The article, excerpted from Bergman's book Rise and Kill First (2018), says that Brunner was located by Israeli spy Eli Cohen.

According to information released by the Israeli intelligence agency Mossad in 2017, it was behind the 1980 letter bomb attack. After intelligence gathering revealed that Brunner had previously bought herbs from an Austrian mail order firm, Mossad agents broke into its office to steal brochures and envelopes with the company logo. After a suitable explosive device was created in Israel, the agents then returned to the town in Austria where the office was located in order to post the letter bomb; however, the slot in the mailbox was too small for it to fit. This necessitated in the agents having to repackage the device into a smaller envelope with less explosives, which resulted in Brunner only being injured rather than being killed outright in the blast it created.

== Convictions in absentia ==
Germany and other countries unsuccessfully requested Brunner's extradition. He was twice sentenced to death in absentia in the 1950s; one of those convictions was in France in 1954. In August 1987, an Interpol "red notice" was issued for him. In 1995, German state prosecutors in Cologne and Frankfurt posted a $330,000 reward for information leading to his arrest.

On 2 March 2001, Brunner was found guilty in absentia by a French court for crimes against humanity, including the arrest and deportation of 345 orphans from the Paris region (which had not been judged in the earlier trials) and was sentenced to life imprisonment. According to Serge Klarsfeld, the trial was largely symbolic—an effort to honour the memories of victims. Klarsfeld's own father, arrested in 1943, was reportedly one of Brunner's victims.

== Later attempts to locate ==
In 2004, the television series Unsolved History, in an episode titled "Hunting Nazis", used facial recognition software to compare Alois Brunner's official SS photograph with a recent photo of "Georg Fischer" from Damascus, and came up with a match of 8.1 points out of 10, which they claimed was, despite the elapse of over 50 years in aging, equivalent to a match with 95% certainty.

In 2005, Brazilian police were reportedly investigating whether a suspect living in the country under an assumed name was actually Alois Brunner. Deputy Commander Asher Ben-Artzi, the head of Israel's Interpol and Foreign Liaison Section, passed on a Brazilian request for Brunner's fingerprints to Nazi hunter Efraim Zuroff, head of the Simon Wiesenthal Center in Jerusalem, but Zuroff could not find any.

In July 2007, the Austrian Justice Ministry declared that they would pay €50,000 for information leading to his arrest and extradition to Austria.

In March 2009, the Simon Wiesenthal Center acknowledged the "slim" possibility of Brunner still being alive. In 2011, some media reports included him on a list of "World's Most Wanted" criminals.

In 2013, the Simon Wiesenthal Center described Brunner as "the most important unpunished Nazi war criminal who may still be alive". Brunner was last seen in 2001 in Syria, whose government had long rebuffed international efforts to locate or apprehend him, but was presumed dead as of 2012.

In April 2014, Brunner was removed from the Simon Wiesenthal Center's list of most-wanted Nazi war criminals.

== Death ==
On 30 November 2014, the Simon Wiesenthal Center reported receiving credible information that Brunner had died in Syria in 2010. He would have been 97 or 98 years old. Partly due to the then-ongoing Syrian civil war, the exact date and place of death were unknown.

According to the director of the Wiesenthal Center, Efraim Zuroff, the information came from a "reliable" former German secret service agent who had served in the Middle East. The information was also reported in the press. The new evidence revealed that Brunner was buried in an unknown location in Damascus around 2010, unrepentant of his crimes to the end. Zuroff said that, owing to the civil war in Syria, the exact location of Brunner's grave was unknowable.

In 2017, the French quarterly review XXI published an investigation about Brunner's last years in Syria by journalists Hédi Aouidj and Mathieu Palain. Three former security guards in charge of the protection of Brunner recounted how the Assad family used him to train intelligence services staff, then afterwards kept him under house arrest in a Damascus basement throughout the 1990s until his death in December 2001. One of the former guards said that Brunner, who went by the name of Abu Hussein, "suffered and cried a lot in his final years", "couldn't even wash" and ate only "an egg or a potato" a day. According to the report at the time of his death, Brunner's body was washed according to Islamic rites. Brunner was buried in secret, and at night, in the Al-Affif cemetery in Damascus. Serge Klarsfeld called the report "highly credible". In March 2021, the district court in Vienna-Döbling officially declared him dead.

== In popular culture ==
Brunner is portrayed by André Eisermann in the 2023 political thriller series Bonn – Alte Freunde, neue Feinde. The series was directed and co-written by Claudia Garde.

Numerous sources have said that Brunner was the inspiration for Hans Landa, the Austrian SS officer nicknamed "the Jew Hunter" in the 2009 Quentin Tarantino film Inglourious Basterds, though Tarantino has not confirmed this.

== Sources ==
- "'The man who killed 130,000 Jews died in Syria basement'". Arab News. 2017-01-12.
- Bartrop, P.R.; Grimm, E.E. (2019). Perpetrating the Holocaust: Leaders, Enablers, and Collaborators. ABC-CLIO. ISBN 978-1-4408-5897-0.
- Baxter, I. (2014). Nazi Concentration Camp Commandants 1933-1945: Rare Photographs from Wartime Archives. Images of War. Pen & Sword Military. ISBN 978-1-78159-388-2.
- Cesarani, D. (2005). Eichmann: His Life and Crimes. Vintage. ISBN 978-0-09-944844-0.
- Megargee, G.P.; White, J.R.; Hecker, M. (2018). The United States Holocaust Memorial Museum Encyclopedia of Camps and Ghettos, 1933–1945: Volume III. Indiana University Press. ISBN 978-0-253-02386-5.
