= Suzanne Kohn =

French Holocaust victim

Suzanne Kohn (née Netre, 18 September 1895 – 8 March 1945) was a French Jew who was murdered in the Holocaust.

Kohn was born into one of France's most prominent Jewish families; her father owned a tobacco company, her grandparents were personal friends of Albert I, Prince of Monaco and she grew up in an environment of wealth and elegance.

Kohn's husband, Armand Kohn, was Secretary-General of the Rothschild Foundation in Paris from 1940. The couple had four children: Antoinette, Rose-Marie, Philippe and Georges André. In 1942 Kohn and her children converted to Catholicism to avoid the persecution of Jews by the Nazi regime, however in July 1944 the family was arrested and imprisoned in the Drancy internment camp in Paris. Kohn and her daughter Antoinette were taken to the Bergen-Belsen concentration camp, where they both were murdered.
