= Bullenhuser Damm =

School used as a concentration camp in Hamburg, Germany

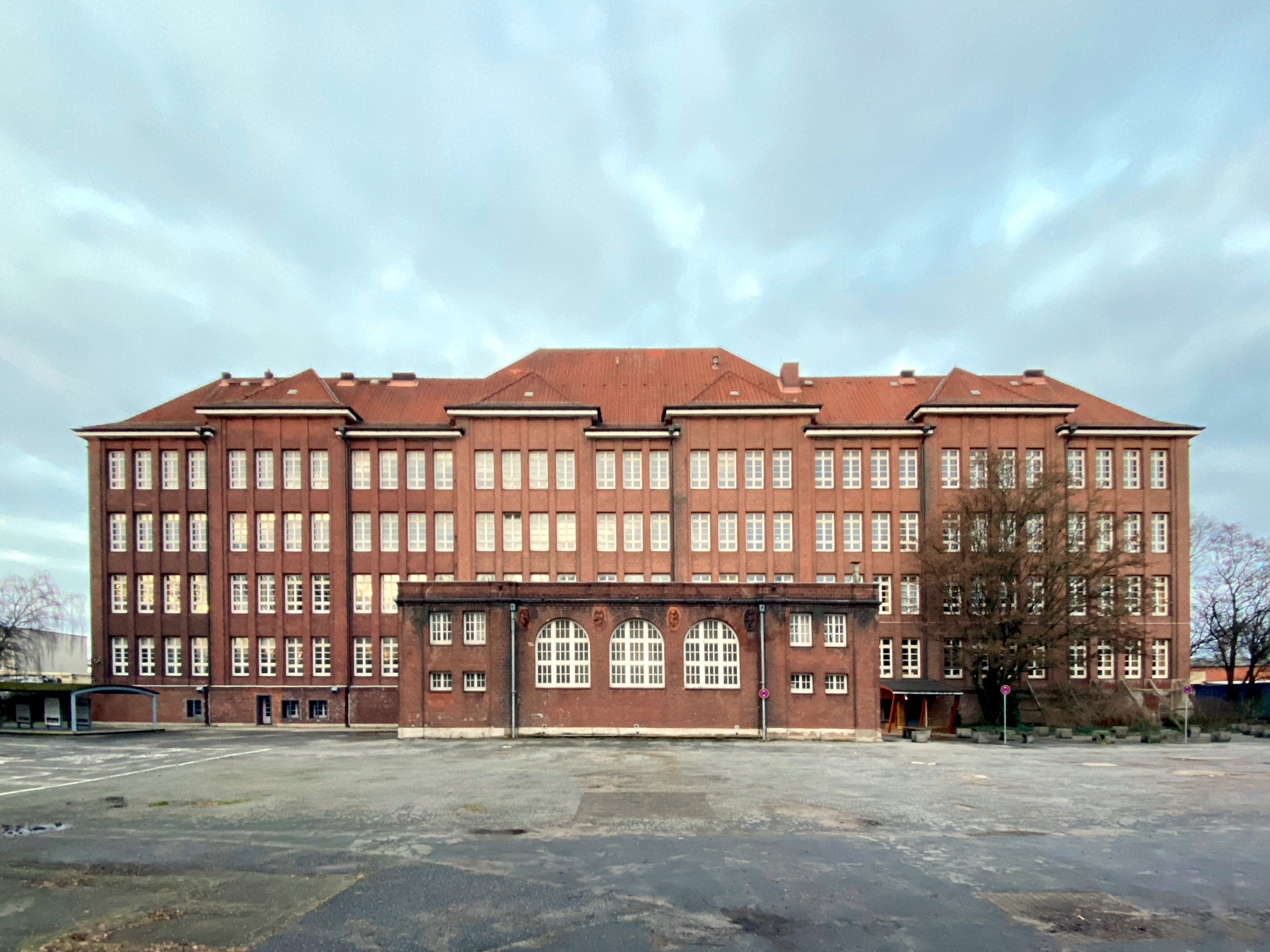
The school at Bullenhuser Damm

The Bullenhuser Damm School is located at 92–94 Bullenhuser Damm in the Rothenburgsort section of Hamburg, Germany – the site of the Bullenhuser Damm Massacre, the murder of 20 children and their adult caretakers at the very end of World War II's Holocaust – to hide evidence they were used as human subjects in brutal medical experimentation.

During heavy air raids in the Second World War, many areas of Hamburg were destroyed, and the Rothenburgsort section was heavily damaged. The school was only slightly damaged. By 1943, the surrounding area was largely obliterated so the building was no longer needed as a school. In October 1944, a subcamp of the Neuengamme concentration camp was established in the school to house prisoners used in clearing the rubble after air raids. The building was evacuated on April 11, 1945. Two SS men were left to guard the school: SS Unterscharführer Johann Frahm and SS Oberscharführer Ewald Jauch, and the janitor Wilhelm Wede.

On the night of April 20, 1945, 20 Jewish children, who had been used as human subjects in medical experiments at Neuengamme, along with their four adult caretakers and six Soviet prisoners, were injected with morphine and suspended from their necks to die on the basement walls of the school. Later that evening, 24 Soviet prisoners were brought from another subcamp at Spaldingstraße to the school to be murdered.

The names, ages and countries of origin of the victims, who'd transited through the Neuengamme concentration camp, were recorded by Hans Meyer, one of the thousands of Scandinavian prisoners released to the custody of Sweden in the closing months of the war.

== Neuengamme experimentation ==
SS physician Kurt Heissmeyer, to achieve a credentialled professorship, needed to present original research. Although previously disproven, his hypothesis was that the injection of live tuberculosis bacilli into subjects would act as a vaccine. Another component of his experimentation was based on pseudoscientific Nazi racial theory that race played a factor in developing tuberculosis.

He attempted to prove his hypothesis by injecting live tuberculosis bacilli into the lungs and bloodstream of Untermenschen (subhumans), Jews and Slavs being considered by the Nazis to be racially inferior to Germans.

He was able to have the facilities made available and to test his subjects as a result of his personal connections: his uncle, SS General August Heissmeyer, and his close acquaintance, SS General Oswald Pohl.

The medical experiments on tuberculosis infection were initially carried out on concentration camp prisoners from the Soviet Union and other countries at the Neuengamme concentration camp. The experiments were then extended to Jews. For this Heissmeyer chose to use Jewish children. Twenty Jewish children (10 boys and 10 girls) from Auschwitz concentration camp were chosen by Josef Mengele and sent to Neuengamme. Mengele allegedly asked the children, "Who wants to go and see their mother?"

The children were accompanied to Neuengamme by four women prisoners. Two were Polish nurses and one was a Hungarian pharmacist, and they were killed upon arrival at Neuengamme. The fourth woman, Polish-born Jew Paula Trocki, was a doctor. She survived the war and later gave testimony in Jerusalem about what she had witnessed:

The transport was accompanied by an SS guard. There were 20 children, one female medical doctor, three nurses. The transport was in a separate carriage that was coupled on a normal train. Presented in this manner it appeared to be an ordinary carriage. We had to take off the stars of David lest we attract any attention. To prevent people from approaching us they said it was a transport of people suffering from typhoid fever... The food was excellent; on that journey we were given chocolate and milk. After a two-day trip we arrived at Neuengamme at ten o'clock at night.

— Paula Trocki

The children were injected with live tuberculosis bacilli, and they all became ill. Heissmeyer then had their axillary lymph nodes surgically removed from their armpits and sent to Hans Klein at the Hohenlychen Hospital for study. All the children were photographed holding up one arm to show the surgical incision. Klein was not prosecuted.

The collapsing western front and imminent approach of British troops prompted the perpetrators to murder the subjects of the experiment to cover up their crimes. The orders for the murders were issued from Berlin.

The children, their four adult caretakers and six Soviet prisoners were taken by truck to the Bullenhuser Damm School in the Hamburg suburb of Rothenburgsort. The school had been taken over by the SS to house prisoners from Neuengamme used to clear rubble from the surrounding area after Allied bombing raids. The SS evacuated the building around April 11, 1945, leaving a skeleton crew of two SS guards: Ewald Jauch and Johann Frahm and a janitor. They were accompanied by three SS guards (Wilhelm Dreimann, Adolf Speck, and Heinrich Wiehagen), as well as the driver, Hans Friedrich Petersen, and SS physician Alfred Trzebinski. The children as well as others were told they were being taken to Theresienstadt. Upon arriving at the school they were led into the basement. According to one of the SS men present, the children "sat down on the benches all around and were cheerful and happy that they had been for once allowed out of Neuengamme. The children were completely unsuspecting."

They were then made to undress and were then injected with morphine by Trzebinski. They were then led into an adjacent room and hanged from hooks set into the wall. The execution was overseen by SS Obersturmführer Arnold Strippel. The first child to be hanged was so light that the noose would not tighten. Frahm grabbed him in a bearhug and used his own weight to pull down and tighten the noose. The adults were hanged from overhead pipes; they were made to stand on a box, which was pulled away from under them. That same night, about 30 additional Soviet prisoners were also brought by lorry to the school to be executed; six escaped, three were shot trying to do so, and the rest were hanged in the basement.

== Victims ==
The children showing the location of the scar where the axillary lymph nodes were excised

Sergio de Simone (b. Nov. 29, 1937 d. April 20, 1945), seven-year-old Jewish Italian boy killed at the Bullenhauser Damm School

- Marek James, a boy aged 6, from Radom, Poland; prisoner no. B 1159.
- H. Wassermann, a girl aged 8, from Poland. Commemorated with the Wassermann Park in Hamburg-Burgwedel, named after her.
- Roman Witonski, a boy aged 6, and his sister; prisoner number A-15160.
- Eleonora Witonska, a girl aged 5, from Radom, Poland; prisoner number A-15159. (Roman and Eleanora were deported to Auschwitz along with their mother, Rucza Witonska (prisoner number A-15158) from the ghetto in Radom, Poland. Their father, Seweryn Witonski, a pediatrician from Radom, was gunned down at an execution in the Szydlowiec cemetery. Ruzca worked in the laboratory of Josef Mengele. In November 1944, the children were separated from their mother when she was sent to the concentration camp in Gebhardsdorf in Lower Silesia. Roman and Eleonora were sent to the "Kinderheim" (orphanage) at Auschwitz. Rucza survived the war and tried to find her children. She later remarried and had another child. Rosa Grumelin has visited the memorial)
- Roman Zeller, a boy aged 12, from Poland. Roman-Zeller-Platz, in Hamburg Schnelsen is named after Roman Zeller.
- Riwka Herszberg, a girl aged 7, from Zdunska Wola, Poland. (Her parents were Mania and Moishe Herszberg. They were kept in the family barracks for a period of time. Her mother survived the war.)
- Mania Altmann, a girl aged 5, from Radom, Poland.
- Sara Goldfinger, a girl aged 11, from Poland.
- Lelka Birnbaum, a girl aged 12, from Poland.
- Ruchla Zylberberg, a girl aged 8, from Zawichost, Poland. (Ruchla's sister, Esther, and her mother, Fajga (née Rosenblum), were gassed upon arrival in Auschwitz. Her father, Nison Zylberberg, survived the war in the Soviet Union, with his brother, Henry, and his sister, Felicja; he then emigrated to the United States. He died in Colorado on September 29, 2002, at the age of 86. He visited the memorial.)
- Eduard Reichenbaum, a boy aged 10, from Katowice, Poland. (His brother Itzhak survived the war and emigrated to Haifa, Israel. He visitied the memorial every year until his death)
- Blumel Mekler, a girl aged 11, from Sandomierz, Poland. (Her sister, Shifra, survived the war because, as she recalled, her mother told her to "run! Shifra! run!" as the round-up began. She was 8 at this time, and Blumel was 5. She was kept hidden by a Polish family. She emigrated to Tel Aviv, Israel, and married. She has visited the memorial.)
- Eduard (Edo) Hornemann, a boy aged 12. (Born on January 1, 1933), he lived with his mother, Elisabeth, his father, Philip, and his brother, Alexander, at 29 Staringstraat in Eindhoven, the Netherlands. His parents worked at the Philips factory. Philip died on February 21, 1945, at Sachsenhausen, where he arrived after a stop at Dachau with the "death march". Elisabeth died of typhus in Auschwitz in October 1944.
- Alexander Hornemann, a boy aged 8. (b. May 31, 1936.)
- Georges André Kohn, a boy aged 12, from Paris, France. (b. April 23, 1932.)
- Jacqueline Morgenstern, a girl aged 12, from Paris. (b. May 26, 1932. A cousin, Henry Morgenstern, survived the war and has visited the memorial several times.)
- Sergio De Simone, a boy aged 7, from Naples, Italy; prisoner no. 179694. (b. November 29, 1937). Son of Italian Eduardo de Simone and his Russian Jewish wife Gisella (née Perlow). Arrested March 21, 1944, in Fiume. First sent to San Sabba then on March 29, 1944, to Auschwitz. His mother survived the war and has visited the memorial.
- Marek Steinbaum, a boy aged 10, from Radom, Poland. (His sister, Lola, survived the war and emigrated to the US, she was living in San Francisco; she has visited the memorial.)
- Walter Jungleib, a boy aged 12, from Slovakia. As researched by Bella Reichenbaum (Haifa), the Neuengamme Concentration Camp Memorial received a letter from Israel in July 2015 noting that the name Jungleib had been recorded on a list of a prisoner transport from Auschwitz to Lippstadt; contact was made with this family near Tel Aviv via the website of the Yad Vashem Memorial; there the 85-year-old Grete Hamburg, born in Hlohovec / Slovakia confirmed that it was her brother: Walter Jacob Jungleib.
- Lea Klygermann, a girl aged 12, from Poland; prisoner no. A 16959.

The children were in the care of four male prisoners, a French doctor and a chemist and two Dutch prisoners, all of whom had been imprisoned because of their anti-German activities.

The French doctor and the chemist were:

- René Quenouille (born December 6, 1887, in Lyon). He was a physician and radiologist at a hospital in Villeneuve-Saint-Georges, near Paris and a member of the French Resistance. He was arrested by the Gestapo, together with his wife, Yvonne, on March 3, 1943. Yvonne was released after three and a half months, but he was sentenced to death, although the sentence was later commuted to imprisonment.
- Professor Gabriel Florence (born June 12, 1884). He was a chemist who taught at the University of Lyon. He fought in World War I and joined the French Resistance during World War II. He was arrested by the Gestapo on March 4, 1944.

The two Dutch prisoners were:

- Anton Hölzel (born May 7, 1909), who came from Deventer. He was a driver and a member of the Dutch Communist Party, who joined the Resistance after the German invasion. He became a waiter at the Novotel Den Haag, a hotel in The Hague, to facilitate the transfer of messages. He was arrested on September 11, 1941, and sent to Buchenwald. He was later transferred to Neuengamme.
- Dirk Deutekom (born December 12, 1895), who was a typographer. A member of the Dutch Resistance, he tried to hinder the deportation of Dutch Jews from the Netherlands. He was arrested in July 1941 and sent to Buchenwald, where he was given a job in the infirmary, owing to his fluency in German. On June 6, 1944, he was transferred to the concentration camp at Neuengamme.

== Criminal prosecutions ==
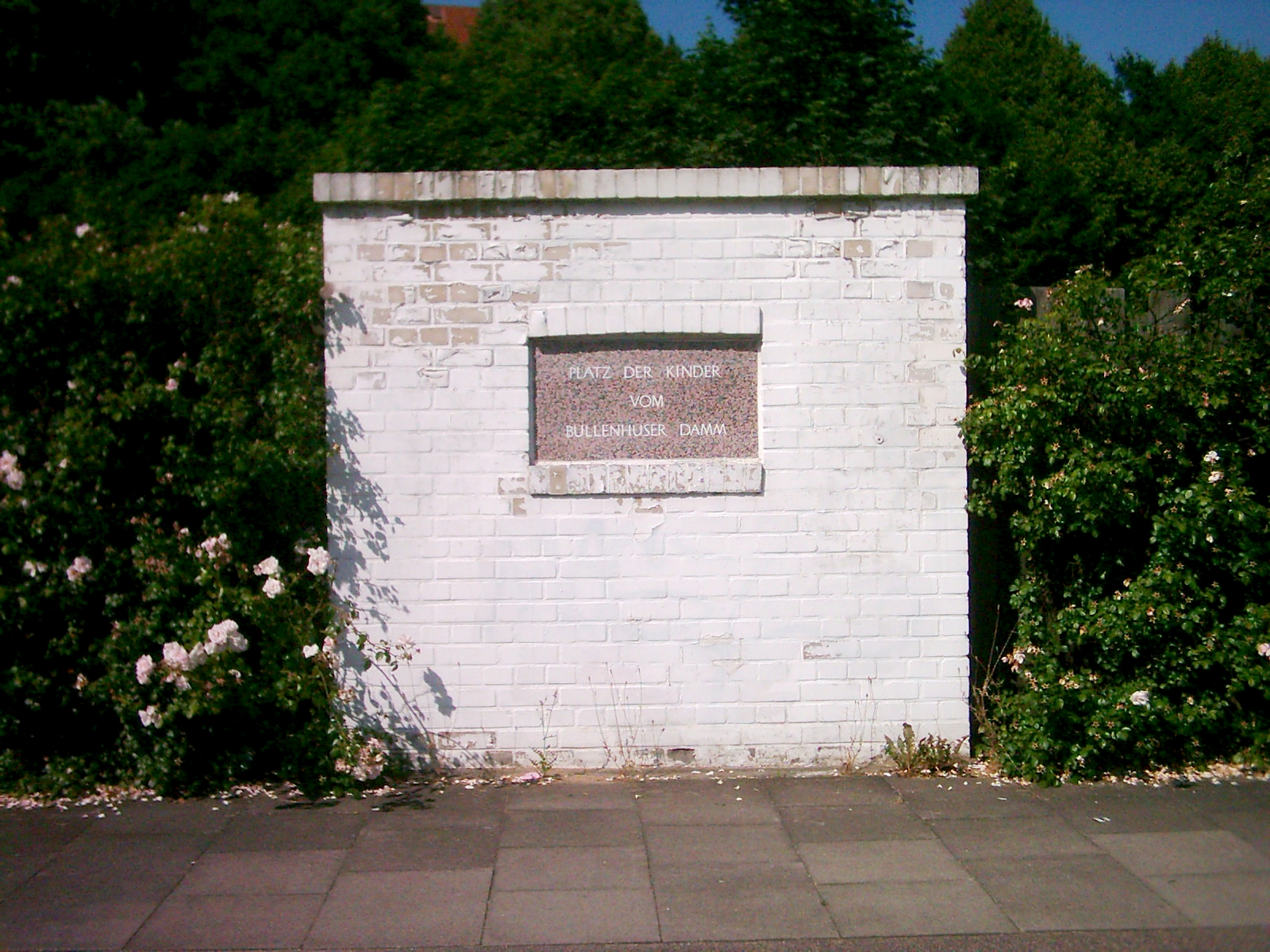
"Place of children from Bullenhuser Damm" in Hamburg, Germany

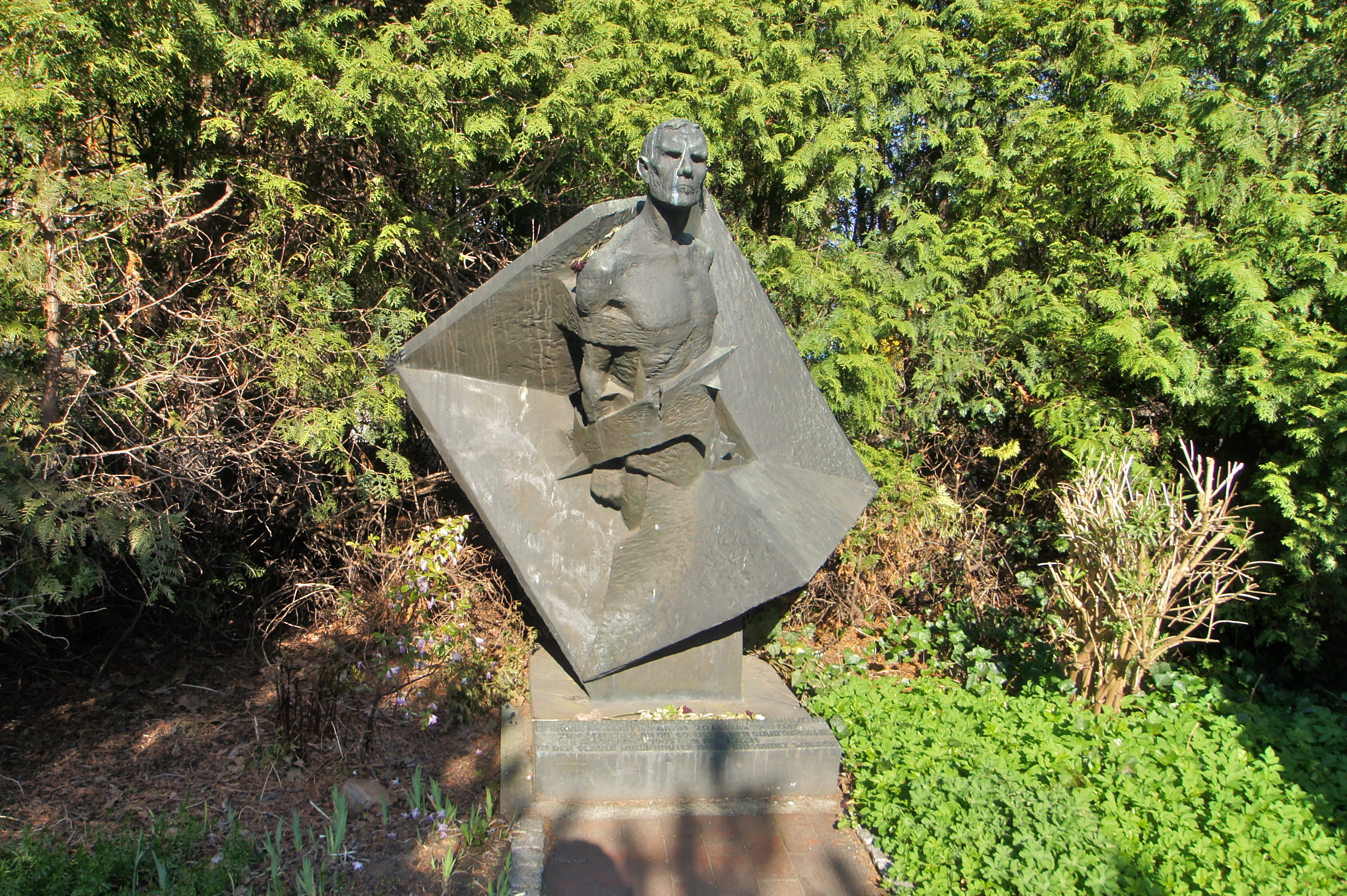
Memorial for the Soviet prisoners

Most of those involved in the killings were tried by a British military court in Hamburg in 1946. Trzebinski, Neuengamme commandant Max Pauly, Dreimann, Speck, Jauch and Frahm were convicted and sentenced to death. They were all hanged at Hamelin Prison on October 8, 1946.

Two of those directly responsible for the children's suffering and murder, Kurt Heissmeyer and Arnold Strippel, escaped and remained at large. Strippel had served at other concentration camps before Neuengamme, including Buchenwald. He was recognized on the street in Frankfurt in 1948 by a former Buchenwald prisoner. He was tried for the murders of 21 Jewish inmates committed on November 9, 1939, as retribution for the failed assassination of Adolf Hitler at the Bürgerbräukeller in Munich by Georg Elser. Strippel was tried, convicted of 21 counts of murder, and sentenced to 21 life terms by a Frankfurt court in 1949. In 1964, an investigation into his involvement with the Bullenhuser Damm School murders was begun by the Hamburg prosecutor's office. The statute of limitations had run out for manslaughter, so he had to be charged with murder. Among the criteria for murder, it had to be proven that the accused acted cruelly, insidiously or with motive. In 1967 the prosecutor, Helmut Münzberg, dropped the charges for lack of evidence, stating that Strippel had not acted cruelly as "the children had not been harmed beyond the extinction of their lives". In 1969, Strippel was released from prison after his other convictions were reduced to being an accessory to murder. After his release, he applied for a retrial, and in 1970 his original conviction was overturned and he was retried. At this retrial, he was convicted as being just an accessory to the Buchenwald murders and sentenced to six years' imprisonment. Because he had already served 20 years in prison, 14 years longer than this sentence, he was compensated with 121,477.92 Deutschmarks. In 1979, partly as a result of articles written by Günther Schwarberg, Strippel's case was reopened. He was not reincarcerated, and in 1987 the case was abandoned by the Hamburg prosecutor's office, owing to Strippel's frailty. Strippel died on May 1, 1994.

Kurt Heissmeyer returned to his home in Magdeburg in postwar East Germany and started a successful medical practice as a lung and tuberculosis specialist. He was eventually found out in 1959. In 1966, he was convicted and sentenced to life imprisonment. At his trial he stated, "I did not think that inmates of a camp had full value as human beings." When asked why he did not use guinea pigs he responded, "For me there was no basic difference between human beings and guinea pigs." He then corrected himself: "Jews and guinea pigs". Heissmeyer died in prison on August 29, 1967.

== Memorial ==
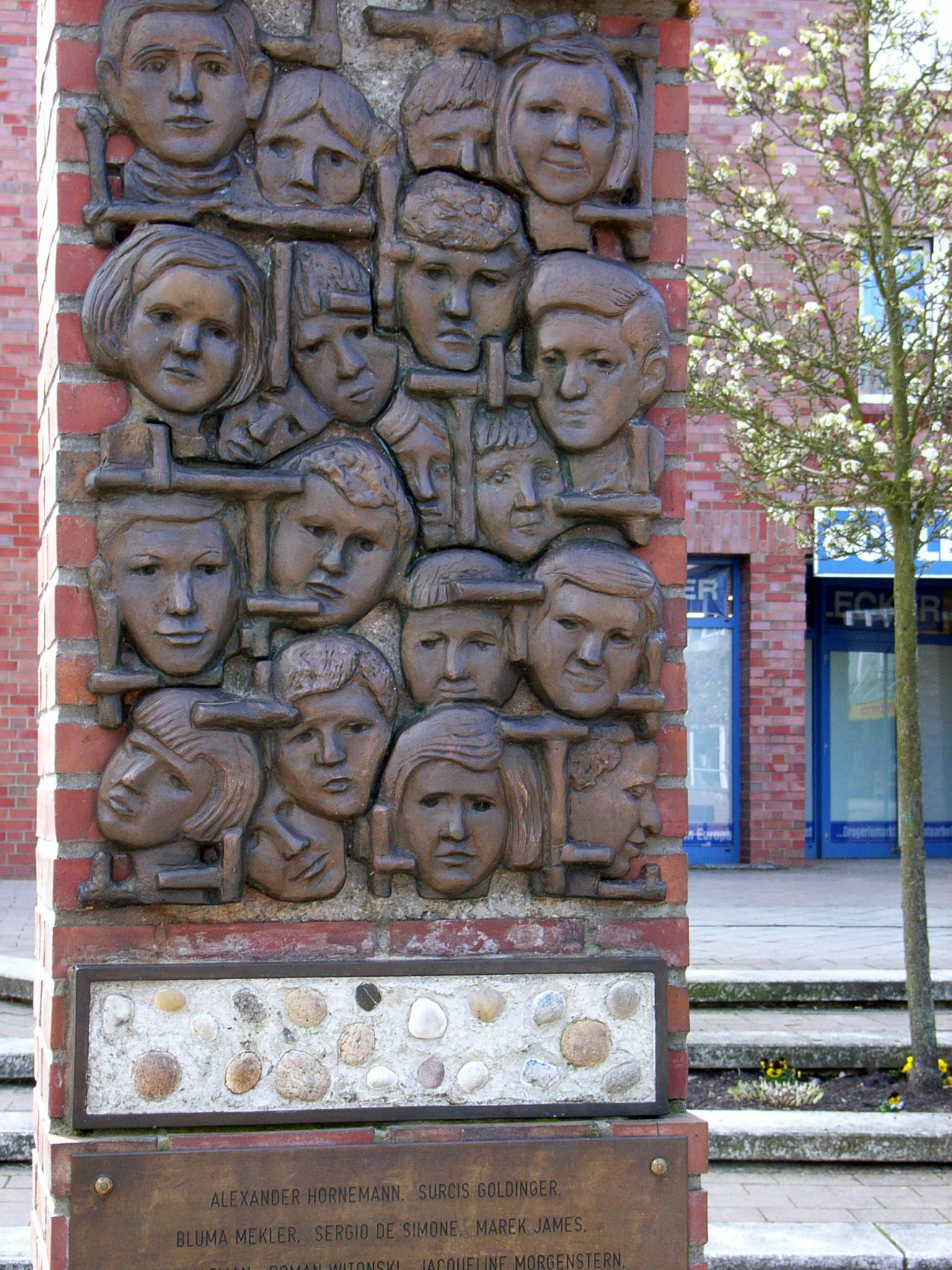
Bronze Relief Stele Commemorating the 20 Children of the Bullenhuser Damm Massacre Bronze relief stele, mounted on brick pilaster; below the relief: listing of the children's names; artist: Leonid Mogilevski (Russian, 1931-); bronze: 0,30m wide 0,60m high; placed July 13, 2001; initiative by and paid for by Hamburg citizens; marked with an annual commemoration on April 20. Location: Roman-Zeller-Platz Hamburg-Schnelsen 53°38′48.9″N 9°54′37.3″E

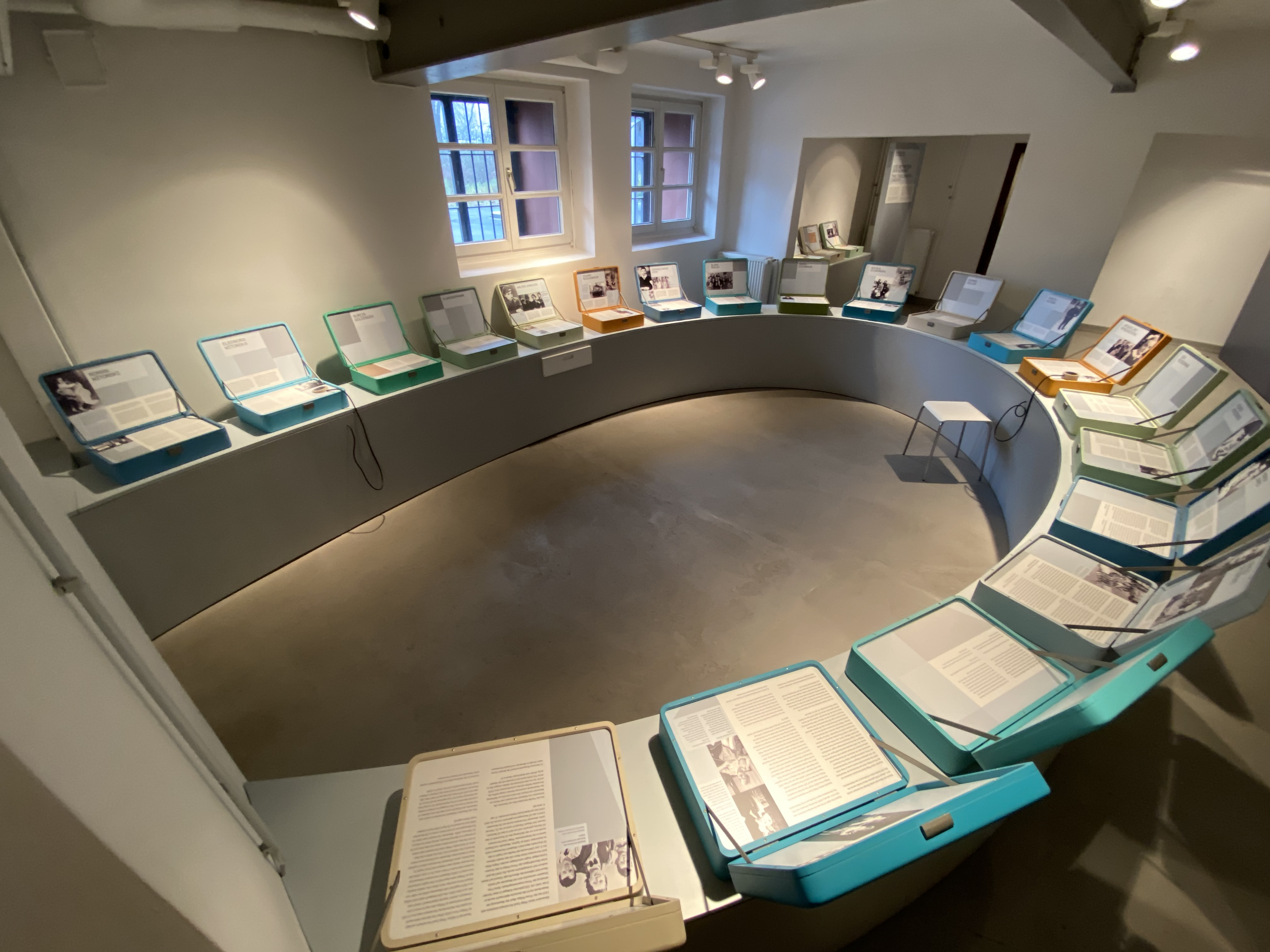
One of the exhibition rooms at Bullenhuser Damm Memorial presenting biographies

The building at Bullenhuser Damm was used by the British as a transit camp for German POWs until 1947. It was then used by the Hydrograpichal Institute's meteorological service until 1949, when it again became a school, for 800 boys. In 1959, the organization representing Neuengamme survivors proposed to the Hamburg school board that a memorial plaque should be placed in the school. However, it was not until 1963 that the text for the plaque was approved. The text aroused controversy because it omitted mention of the Soviet victims and did not state that the children were Jewish or give any information about their personal identity. In 1980, information signs were placed in the basement of the school, and the Senate of Hamburg (government) declared the school to be a memorial site, renaming it Janusz Korczak School: Korczak was a Polish-Jewish pediatrician and author who was murdered at Treblinka extermination camp with about 190 orphans. A rose garden was established in 1985.

Later, in the Schnelsen Quarter of the city several streets were named after the children who died at the school and a memorial tablet was installed. Much of the work of identifying the victims and of bringing the story to the public's attention was due to the efforts of the journalis Günther Schwarberg.

In 2005, Wolfgang Peiner, Minister of Finance of Hamburg, published plans to sell the building. However, after several protests a spokesman denied these plans.

In 2011 a new exhibition (telling the story in German and English) was opened at the Memorial.

== See also ==
- List of subcamps of Neuengamme
- The Rose Garden - a film based on these events
