= Alfred Trzebinski =

SS physician in Nazi Germany (1902–1946)

Alfred Albrecht Josef Trzebinski
- Born: 29 August 1902; Jutroschin, Kingdom of Prussia, German Empire
- Died: 8 October 1946 (aged 44); Hamelin Prison, Hamelin, Allied-occupied Germany
- Cause of death: Execution by hanging
- Military career
- Allegiance: Nazi Germany
- Branch: Schutzstaffel
- Rank: Hauptsturmführer
- Commands: SS Medical Corps in concentration camps
- Other work: Executed for the medical atrocities and murders of children he committed in concentration camps

Alfred Trzebinski (29 August 1902 – 8 October 1946) was an SS-physician at the Auschwitz, Majdanek and Neuengamme concentration camps in Nazi Germany. He was sentenced to death and executed for his involvement in war crimes committed at the Neuengamme subcamps.

== Life ==
Trzebinski was born in Jutroschin, Province of Posen. After his study and graduation he became a physician in Saxony. Trzebinski was a member of the Nazi Party and SS. Trzebinski was a camp physician (German: Lagerarzt) at Auschwitz concentration camp from July 1941 to October 1941, and from October 1941 to September 1943 at the Majdanek camp. He was then transferred to Neuengamme concentration camp. At Neuengamme he was the supervisor for SS physician Kurt Heissmeyer. Heißmeyer had done medical experiments on adult concentration camp prisoners and children. Trzebinski was liable for the medical care of the inmates of the Neuengamme camp and all its subcamps. Of 100,000 inmates, at least 42,900 died between 1938 and 1945.

== Murder of children ==
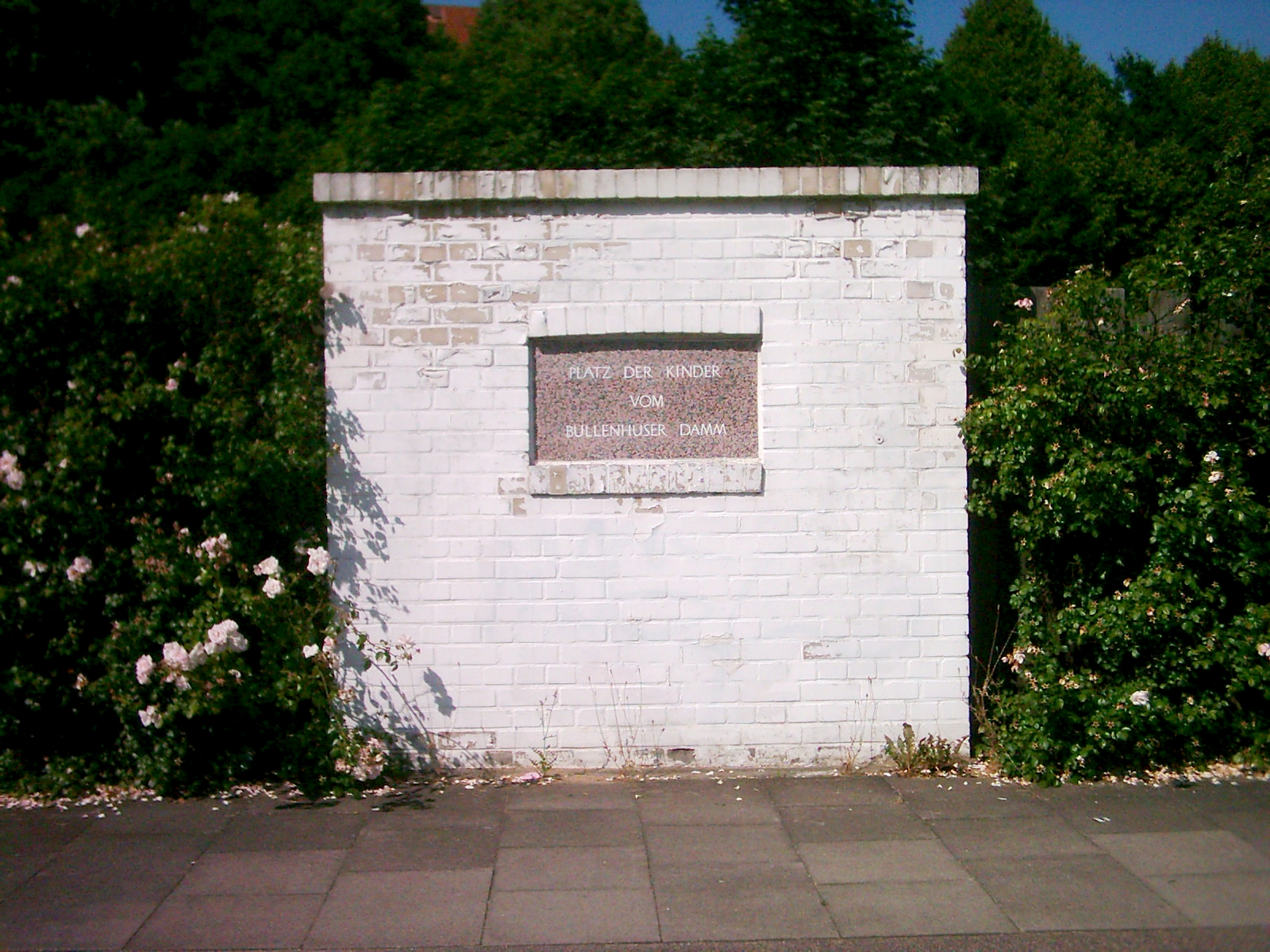
Commemorative Marker, the Place of Children of Bullenhuser Damm at the site of the Bullenhuser Damm Massacre, April 20, 1945 in Hamburg, Germany

Trzebinski was involved in the murder of 20 children at the subcamp Bullenhuser Damm, a former school partly destroyed during the bombing of Hamburg in World War II. Heißmeyer had ordered 20 Jewish children (10 boys and 10 girls) from Auschwitz to continue his experiments. His purpose had been to inject tuberculosis bacteria and to excise the axillary lymph nodes. On the night of 20 April 1945, Trzebinski injected morphine into the children (to sedate them) after which they were hanged in the basement of the Bullenhuser Damm school. That same night, 28 adults died as well, the children's four adult caretakers and 24 Soviet prisoners.

== Trial and execution ==
Trzebinski was able to escape at the end of the Second World War. On 1 February 1946 he was arrested—after working for the British forces in the POW camp Neumünster—because of the persistency of Walter Freud, a grandchild of Sigmund Freud.

Trzebinski was sentenced to death during the "Curiohaus Trials" in Rotherbaum in March 1946, also for his complicity in the homicide of the children. At his trial he confessed freely and frankly, saying, "If I had acted as a hero the children might have died a little later, but their fate could no longer be averted" and admitted "you cannot execute children, you can only murder them" but they were "only" Jews. Trzebinski was executed by hanging on 8 October 1946 by Albert Pierrepoint at Hamelin Prison.
