= The Rose Garden (film) =

1989 American film by Fons Rademakers

- Directed by: Fons Rademakers
- Screenplay by: Paul Hengge
- Produced by: Artur Brauner
- Starring: Liv Ullmann; Maximilian Schell; Peter Fonda; Jan Niklas; Hanns Zischler; Gila Almagor
- Cinematography: Gernot Roll
- Edited by: Kees Linthorst
- Music by: Egisto Macchi
- Production company: The Cannon Group
- Distributed by: Cannon Film Distributors
- Release date: December 22, 1989
- Running time: 112 minutes
- Countries: United States; Germany; Austria
- Language: English

The Rose Garden is a 1989 American drama film directed by Fons Rademakers and written by Paul Hengge. The film stars Liv Ullmann, Maximilian Schell, Peter Fonda, Jan Niklas, Hanns Zischler, Alma Almagor as Ruthi and Kurt Hübner. The film was released on December 22, 1989, by Cannon Film Distributors.

== Plot ==
A holocaust survivor Aaron Reichenbach (Maximilian Schell) returns to Germany and attacks ex-Nazi officer Arnold Krenn (Kurt Hübner) in a Frankfurt airport. When Arnold files assault charges, a public defender, Gabriele Schlüter-Freund (Liv Ullmann), represents Aaron, expecting a straightforward case. But when Gabriele discovers that Aaron is one of many victims of cruel medical experiments in concentration camps, she resolves to seek justice. Aaron is reunited with his long lost sister Ruthi (Gila Almagor) who has also survived. At the end of the movie the experimentation on, and execution of 20 Jewish children in the Bullenhuser Damm is revealed by Ruthi. Arnold Krenn is found not guilty although he was.

== Cast ==
- Liv Ullmann as Gabriele
- Maximilian Schell as Aaron
- Peter Fonda as Herbert
- Jan Niklas as Paessler
- Hanns Zischler as Eckert
- Kurt Hübner as Krenn (Krenn was based on Arnold Strippel)
- Georg Marischka as Brinkmann
- Gila Almagor as Ruth
- Lena Müller as Tina
- Nicolaus Sombart as Judge
- Özay Fecht as Mrs. Marques
- Achim Ruppel as Klaus
- Friedhelm Lehmann as Professor Stauffer
- Mareike Carrière as Mrs. Moerbler
- Lutz Weidlich as Schubert
- Peter Kortenbach as Emminger
- Marco Kröger as Harald
- Hans-Jürgen Schatz as Hrudek
- Dagmar Cassens as Dr. Kurth
- Horst D. Scheel as Ward Physician
- Roland Schäfer as SS Doctor
- Uwe Schawz as SS Unterscharfuehrer
- Rolf Mautz as SS Rottenfuehrer
- Martin Hoppe as Young Krenn
- Helga Sloop as Old Lady
- Helmut Krauss as Taxi Driver
- Hans Martin Stier as Patient
- Barbara Werz as Frau Hasold
- Sylvia Martin as Frau Stülp
- Andreas Schmidt as Vladimir
- Deirdre Fitzpatrick as Helga
- Ines Fridman as Rachel Reichenbach
- Evelyn Kussmann as Ruth Reichenbach
- Ute Brankatsch as Journalist
- Jean-Theo Jost as Court Officer
