= Arnold Strippel =

German SS commander and criminal (1911–1994)

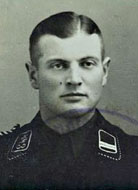
- Born: 2 June 1911; Hessen, German Empire
- Died: 1 May 1994 (aged 82); Frankfurt, Germany
- Known for: Bullenhuser Damm murders Deputy commandant of Majdanek concentration camp
- Status: Deceased
- Conviction: Accessory to murder (62 counts)
- Trial: Majdanek Trials
- Penalty: Life imprisonment; commuted to 6 years imprisonment (original sentence in 1949; conviction and sentence revised in 1970); 3.5 years imprisonment (1981)
- SS career
- Allegiance: Nazi Germany
- Branch: Schutzstaffel
- Service years: 1934–1945
- Rank: Obersturmführer (1st Lieutenant)

Arnold Strippel (2 June 1911 – 1 May 1994) was a German SS commander during the Nazi era and a convicted criminal. As a member of the SS-Totenkopfverbände, while assigned to the Neuengamme concentration camp, he was given the task of murdering a group of children who had suffered a tuberculosis medical experiment conducted by Kurt Heissmeyer.

== SS career ==
Strippel served in various concentration camps starting in 1934, when he joined the SS. His first assignment was at Sachsenburg, and his next was Buchenwald, where he participated in the shooting of 21 Jewish inmates on November 9, 1939, following the failed assassination attempt on Adolf Hitler in Munich. While at Buchenwald, Strippel caught an inmate who was using a rope and some paper to alleviate heavy loads he was carrying on his work. This was against camp regulations (stealing Third Reich property), so Strippel decided to make an example out of him. "You used this rope; you'll hang on a rope. And the whole camp will watch as you twist in the wind." The inmate's hands were tied behind his back and he was lifted two feet off the ground from a tree. The weight of his body was all on the shoulder joints and the pain was "excruciating beyond all description."

Strippel's next assignment from March to October 1941 was the Natzweiler-Struthof concentration camp in occupied France. Strippel then served in Majdanek near Lublin Poland, Ravensbrück, then at Peenemünde on the Usedom peninsula, in the Karlshagen II forced labor camp, the site of V-2 rocket production and launches. From there, he worked at Herzogenbusch concentration camp, in the Netherlands, more commonly known as Camp Vught. During his time in Herzogenbusch, Strippel participated in the Bunker Tragedy. His final assignment was at Neuengamme.

== Trial and conviction ==
In the fall of 1948, Strippel voluntarily turned himself into U.S. occupation authorities Dachau internment camp. He was released after presenting them with the proper papers. However, in December 1948 a former Buchenwald prisoner recognized Strippel on the street and immediately alerted the authorities. In 1949 a West German court found Strippel guilty of 21 counts of murder, inflicting grievous bodily harm, and violating his duty to provide proper care. He was sentenced to 21 life terms in prison plus 10 years. In 1965 Strippel, who was still in prison, was investigated for supervising the hangings of 20 Jewish children at the Bullenhuser Damm to conceal the fact that they had been used as human test subjects. However, the investigation was halted after the prosecutor concluded that he could not prove Strippel had acted with "base motives", which is required under German law for a murder conviction. He could not prosecute Strippel for manslaughter either, since the statute of limitations had expired. The prosecutor [Helmut Münzberg] also declined to prosecute Strippel for supervising the subsequent executions of 30 Soviet POWs, after concluding that they had been lawfully killed after a trial.

In 1969 Strippel's murder convictions were reduced to accessory to murder, resulting in his release on 21 April 1969, since he'd already served more time than the maximum sentence. In 1970, Strippel's sentence was formally reduced to six years. He then received approximately 121,500 DM from the West German government for the 14 additional years that he had "unjustly" spent in prison. In 1979, Strippel won a fine against a newspaper accusing him of murdering the Soviet POWs whose executions he'd supervised at Bullenhuser Damm.

In 1981, Strippel was convicted of 41 counts of being an accessory to murder at the Third Majdanek Trial before the West German Court in Düsseldorf (1975–1981) for his actions at Buchenwald and at the Majdanek concentration camp, where he served as deputy commandant (Case no. 145 & 616 in Frankfurt District Court). He was implicated in the torture and killing of dozens of people. Strippel received a nominal 3 1/2-year sentence for organizing the murders of 21 Soviet POWs, which he did not have to serve due to the "unjust time" he'd already served. In 1983, a West German court ordered the local prosecutor to investigate Strippel for the Bullenhuser Damm murders. However, the case was dropped in 1987, due to Strippel's ill health. Strippel used the money he'd received from the West German government to purchase a condominium on Talstrasse in Frankfurt Kalbach, which he occupied until he died in 1994.

== In popular culture ==
A character inspired by Strippel was featured in the 1989 film The Rose Garden.
