= Günther Schwarberg =

German journalist and author (1926-2008)

Günther Schwarberg (14 October 1926 – 3 December 2008) was a German journalist and author whose 1979 series of articles in German news magazine Der Stern and subsequent book The SS Doctor and the Children brought the World War II-era war crimes committed in Neuengamme concentration camp and Bullenhuser Damm School in Hamburg to the public's conscience in Germany, and the rest of the world. He worked at the Weser Courier in the beginning of his career then the Bremer Nachrichten in Bremen and worked at Der Stern for twenty five years.

== Bibliography ==
- Die Kinder vom Bullenhuser Damm. Hamburg: Staatliche Landesbildstelle Hamburg/Museumspädagogischer Dienst Hamburg, 1983. (in German)
- The Murders at Bullenhuser Damm: The SS Doctor and the Children (English version) Göttingen, 1988 ISBN 3-88243-095-8
- Angriffsziel Cap Arcona (Attack on the Cap Arcona) (1998) ISBN 3-88243-590-9
- Der Juwelier von Majdanek (The Jeweler of Majdanek) (1981) ISBN 3-570-02526-8
- Der letzte Tag von Oradour (The Last Day of Oradour), Göttingen 1992 ISBN 3-88243-092-3
- Die Mörderwaschmaschine (The Killers Laundry) Steidl (January 1990) ISBN 3-88243-150-4
- Meine zwanzig Kinder (My Twenty Children), Göttingen 1996 ISBN 3-88243-431-7
- Die letzte Fahrt der Exodus (The Last Voyage of the Exodus), Göttingen 1988 ISBN 3-88243-097-4
- In the Ghetto of Warsaw (English) 2 March 2001 ISBN 978-3-88243-214-5
- Es war einmal ein Zauberberg: Thomas Mann in Davos: Eine Spurensuche (There Once Was a Magic Mountain) Steidl (January 2001) (English version) ISBN 3-88243-775-8
- Sommertage bei Bertolt Brecht (Summer with Bertolt Brecht) ISBN 3-89136-613-2
- Dein ist mein ganzes Herz(Fritz Löhner-Beda) Yours is My Heart (2000) ISBN 3-88243-715-4
- Das vergess ich nie (I'll never forget), Göttingen 2007 ISBN 978-3-86521-560-4

=== As coauthor ===
- At Home and in the World, Societe des Expositions du Palais des Beaux-Arts de Bruxelles (February 2, 2001) ISBN 90-74816-21-5

== Filmography ==
- Das Tribunal – Mord am Bullenhuser Damm
