= Schnelsen =

- Quarter of Hamburg
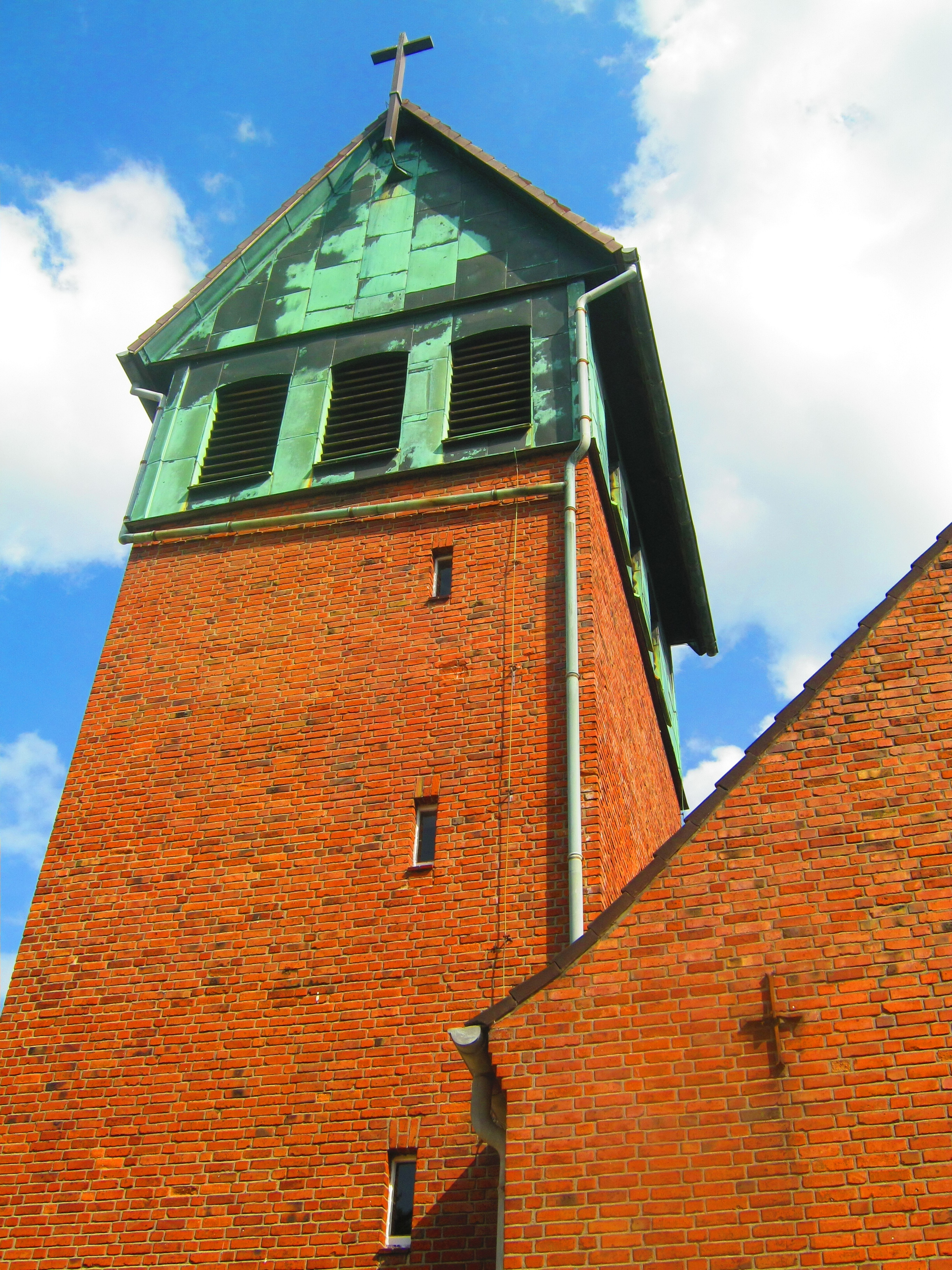
- Advent Church in Schnelsen

- Location of Schnelsen in Hamburg
- Interactive map of Schnelsen
- Location within Germany Location within Hamburg
- Coordinates: 53°38′0″N 9°55′0″E
- Country: Germany
- State: Hamburg
- City: Hamburg
- Borough: Eimsbüttel

Area
  - Total: 9.0 km^{2} (3.5 sq mi)

Population (2024-12-31)
  - Total: 31,323
  - Density: 3,500/km^{2} (9,000/sq mi)
- Time zone: UTC+01:00 (CET)
  - Summer (DST): UTC+02:00 (CEST)
- Dialling codes: 040
- Vehicle registration: HH

Schnelsen (German pronunciation: [ˈʃnɛlzn̩]) is a quarter of Hamburg, Germany, in the borough of Eimsbüttel. In 2020 it had a population of over 30,100 people and borders the state of Schleswig-Holstein.

== Geography ==
Schnelsen borders with the quarters Eidelstedt and Niendorf. It also borders with Rellingen, Ellerbek and Bönningstedt in the Kreis Pinneberg as well as Norderstedt in Segeberg, which are both parts of Schleswig-Holstein.

== Politics ==
These are the results of Schnelsen in the Hamburg state election:

State Election	SPD	Greens	CDU	Left	AfD	FDP	Others
2020	46,3 %	21,1 %	11,1 %	6,0 %	5,8 %	4,3 %	5,4 %
2015	53,7 %	9,5 %	15,1 %	5,4 %	6,0 %	7,2 %	3,2 %
2011	53,0 %	8,8 %	21,5 %	4,5 %	–	4,5 %	4,9 %
2008	33,0 %	7,8 %	46,2 %	5,3 %	–	5,2 %	2,1 %

== Transportation ==
Schnelsen has access to the AKN and 8 different bus lines.
