= Kurt Heissmeyer =

German physician and Nazi criminal (1905–1967)

Kurt Heissmeyer (26 December 1905 – 29 August 1967) was a Nazi SS physician involved in medical experimentation on concentration camp inmates including children, notably seven-year old Sergio de Simone.

== Medical experiments ==
In order to obtain a professorship, Heissmeyer needed to present original research.

Although previously disproven, his hypothesis was that the injection of live tuberculosis bacilli into subjects would act as a vaccine. Another component of his experimentation was based on pseudoscientific Nazi racial theory that race played a factor in developing tuberculosis. He attempted to prove his hypothesis by injecting live tuberculosis bacilli into the lungs and bloodstream of "Untermenschen" (subhumans), Jews and Slavs being considered by the Nazis to be racially inferior to Germans.

He was able to have the facilities made available and to test his subjects as a result of personal connections: his uncle, SS general August Heissmeyer, and his close acquaintance, SS general Oswald Pohl.

His experiment was conducted on 20 Jewish children at Neuengamme concentration camp. The children, along with their four adult caretakers, were murdered by being hanged in the basement of Bullenhuser Damm School in Hamburg.

After the war, Heissmeyer escaped detection and returned to his home in Magdeburg in postwar East Germany and started a successful medical practice as a lung and tuberculosis specialist. He was eventually found out in 1959, and arrested in 1963. In 1966, he was convicted and sentenced to life imprisonment. At his trial he stated, "I did not think that inmates of a camp had full value as human beings." When asked why he didn't use guinea pigs he responded, "For me there was no basic difference between human beings and guinea pigs." He then corrected himself: "Jews and guinea pigs". Heissmeyer died in prison on 29 August 1967.

== See also ==
- Bullenhuser Damm
