= Hamburg-Steinwerder concentration camp =

Hamburg-Steinwerder was a subcamp of Neuengamme, operational from July 1944 to April 1945, whose prisoners were forced to work in Steinwerder shipyard by the German company Blohm & Voss. At least 89 prisoners died.

== Sources ==
- Buggeln, Marc (2009). "Hamburg-Steinwerder (Blohm & Voss)". In Megargee, Geoffrey P. (ed.). Early Camps, Youth Camps, and Concentration Camps and Subcamps under the SS-Business Administration Main Office (WVHA). Encyclopedia of Camps and Ghettos, 1933–1945. Vol. 1. Translated by Pallavicini, Stephen. Indiana University Press. pp. 1126–1127. ISBN 978-0-253-35328-3.
- Eiber, Ludwig (1996). "Das KZ-Außenlager Blohm & Voss im Hamburger Hafen". Konzentrationslager und deutsche Wirtschaft 1939–1945 (in German). VS Verlag für Sozialwissenschaften. pp. 227–238. ISBN 978-3-322-97342-9.
- Meyhoff, Andreas. Blohm & Voss im »Dritten Reich«, Eine Hamburger Großwerft zwischen Geschäft und Politik (Hamburger Beiträge zur Sozial- und Zeitgeschichte, Band 38) (in German). Hamburg, Germany: Forschungsstelle für Zeitgeschichte in Hamburg, 2001. ISBN 3-89244-916-3.
