= Geoffrey P. Megargee =

American military historian (1959–2020)

- Born: November 4, 1959; Esopus, New York, U.S.
- Died: August 1, 2020 (aged 60); Arlington, Virginia, U.S.
- Occupations: Historian, author, editor

Academic background
- Education: Ohio State University (PhD); San Jose State University (MA); St. Lawrence University (BA)

Academic work
- Era: 20th century
- Institutions: United States Holocaust Memorial Museum
- Main interests: Modern European history Military history History of the Holocaust
- Notable works: Encyclopedia of Camps and Ghettos, 1933–1945

Geoffrey P. Megargee (November 4, 1959 – August 1, 2020) was an American historian and author who specialized in World War II military history and the history of the Holocaust. He served as the project director and editor-in-chief for the Encyclopedia of Camps and Ghettos, 1933–1945 produced by the United States Holocaust Memorial Museum. Megargee's work on the German High Command (the OKW) won the 2001 Distinguished Book Award from the Society for Military History.

== Early life and education ==
Megargee was born in Esopus, New York in 1959 and graduated from St. Lawrence University, St. Lawrence County, New York, with a Bachelor of Arts in 1981. He then served in the United States Army and worked in the private sector. He completed a Master of Arts in European history at the San Jose State University and then completed his Doctor of Philosophy in military history at the Ohio State University in 1998.

== Academic career ==
=== Nazi military history ===
Megargee authored several books on the German military operations during World War II, including a 2006 work on Operation Barbarossa, the Germany invasion of the Soviet Union. Titled War of Annihilation: Combat and Genocide on the Eastern Front, 1941, the book focuses on the intermingling of military and genocidal aims of Nazi Germany during the invasion. Reviewing the book, historian Stephen G. Fritz of East Tennessee State University notes that Megargee's intention was to remediate a "curious disconnect in the historical literature on the German-Soviet war between the campaign's military and criminal aspects". Fritz commends the author on this intention and that he has written "an excellent synthesis of the first six months of the Nazi-Soviet war that manages to be both concise and yet surprisingly substantive". According to Fritz, the book also focuses on the "recurring characteristic of the German war effort: considerable operational aptitude combined with strategic confusion".

Megargee also authored the 2000 book Inside Hitler's High Command. Published by the University Press of Kansas, the book received the 2001 Distinguished Book Award from the Society for Military History. Inside Hitler's High Command looks at the inner workings of the Supreme Command of the Armed Forces, the OKW (Oberkommando der Wehrmacht). Reviewing the work for Foreign Affairs magazine, the political scientist Eliot A. Cohen describes the book as a "well-executed history that demolishes self-exculpatory accounts" by Wehrmacht generals who subscribe to the " 'if the Führer had only listened to me' school of historiography". Cohen notes:

In a clear but scholarly analysis of the German high command, Megargee shows that the German general staff, despite flashes of real brilliance, had deep, long-term flaws in such areas as intelligence, logistics, and strategic planning. (...) His analysis reminds the reader that it is the drudgery of staff work that often wins and loses wars; it is a tribute to the author's abilities that he can make that fact not only clear but highly interesting.

=== Encyclopedia of Camps and Ghettos ===
Megargee served as the project director and editor-in-chief for the Encyclopedia of Camps and Ghettos, 1933–1945, a seven-part encyclopedia series that explores the history of the concentration camps, ghettos, forced-labor camps, and other sites of detention, persecution, or state-sponsored murder run by Nazi Germany and other Axis powers in Europe and Africa. The series is produced by the United States Holocaust Memorial Museum (USHMM) and published by Indiana University Press. Research began in 2000; the first volume was published in 2009; the final volume is slated for publication in 2025. Along with entries on individual sites, the encyclopedias also contain scholarly overviews for historical context.

The project attracted media attention when its editors announced in 2013 that the series would cover more than 42,500 sites, eight times more than expected. The first two volumes in the series, covering the Nazi German concentration camps and Nazi German ghettos, received a positive response from both scholars and survivors. Multiple scholars have described the encyclopedias as the most comprehensive reference on their given subjects. Volume I was awarded the 2009 National Jewish Book Award in the Holocaust category.

== Death ==
Megargee died peacefully at home in Arlington Virginia on August 1, 2020, after a nine-month illness.

== Awards ==
- 2001 Distinguished Book Award from the Society for Military History for Inside Hitler's High Command (2000)
- 2009 National Jewish Book Award for the Encyclopedia of Camps and Ghettos, 1933–1945, Volume I in the Holocaust category.

== Publications ==
- Megargee, Geoffrey P. (2000). Inside Hitler's High Command. Lawrence, Kansas: University Press of Kansas. ISBN 0-7006-1015-4.
- Megargee, Geoffrey P. (2006). War of Annihilation: Combat and Genocide on the Eastern Front, 1941. Lanham, MA: Rowman & Littlefield. ISBN 978-0-7425-4482-6.
- Megargee, Geoffrey P., ed. (2009). Early Camps, Youth Camps, and Concentration Camps and Subcamps under the SS-Business Administration Main Office (WVHA). Encyclopedia of Camps and Ghettos, 1933–1945. Vol. I. Bloomington: Indiana University Press. ISBN 978-0-253-35328-3.
- Megargee, Geoffrey P., ed. (2012). Ghettos in German-Occupied Eastern Europe. Encyclopedia of Camps and Ghettos, 1933–1945. Vol. II. Bloomington: Indiana University Press. ISBN 978-0-253-00202-0.
- Megargee, Geoffrey P., ed. (2018). Camps and Ghettos under European Regimes Aligned with Nazi Germany. Encyclopedia of Camps and Ghettos, 1933–1945. Vol. III. Bloomington: Indiana University Press. ISBN 978-0-253-02373-5.
