= Concentration Camps in Nazi Germany (book) =

2009 essay collection

Concentration Camps in Nazi Germany: The New Histories
- Title page for Concentration Camps in Nazi Germany: The New Histories (2009)
- Editor: Jane Caplan; Nikolaus Wachsmann
- Language: English
- Genre: Essay collection
- Publisher: Routledge
- Publication date: 2009

Concentration Camps in Nazi Germany: The New Histories is a collection of essays on aspects of the Nazi concentration camps, edited by Jane Caplan and Nikolaus Wachsmann. It was published by Routledge in 2009.
