= Tandler =

Tandler is a surname. Notable people with the surname include:

- Adolf Tandler (1875–?), American film score composer and conductor of the Los Angeles Symphony Orchestra
- Hans Tandler (1901–1959), Austrian footballer
- Julius Tandler (1869–1936), Austrian physician and Social Democratic politician
- Maik Tändler (born (1979), German historian
