= Encyclopedia of Camps and Ghettos, 1933–1945 =

Encyclopedia on the Holocaust

- Cover art of Volume II of the Encyclopedia
- Editor: Geoffrey P. Megargee
- Language: English
- Genre: History; Holocaust studies
- Publisher: Indiana University Press; United States Holocaust Memorial Museum
- Publication date: 2009 (Volume I); 2012 (Volume II); 2018 (Volume III); 2022 (Volume IV)
- Publication place: United States
- Media type: Print, PDF
- Awards: 2009 National Jewish Book Award
- Website: www.ushmm.org/research/publications/encyclopedia-camps-ghettos

The Encyclopedia of Camps and Ghettos, 1933–1945 is a seven-part encyclopedia series that explores the history of the concentration camps, ghettos, forced-labor camps, and other sites of detention, persecution, or state-sponsored murder run by Nazi Germany and other Axis powers in Europe and Africa. The series is produced by the United States Holocaust Memorial Museum (USHMM) and published by Indiana University Press. Research began in 2000; the first volume was published in 2009; and the final volume is slated for publication in 2025. Along with entries on individual sites, the encyclopedias also contain scholarly overviews for historical context.

The project attracted media attention when its editors announced in 2013 that the series would cover more than 42,500 sites, eight times more than expected. The first two volumes in the series, covering the Nazi concentration camps and Nazi ghettos, received a positive response from both scholars and survivors. Multiple scholars have described the encyclopedias as the most comprehensive reference on their given subjects.

== Publication history ==
The work on the series began in 2000 by the researchers at the USHMM's Center for Advanced Holocaust Studies. Its general editor and project director is the American historian Geoffrey P. Megargee. The project has received financial support from the Helen Bader Foundation and the Claims Conference. The entries are written by experts on each individual site; contributors include professional historians as well as a wide variety of amateurs, including survivors and relatives of perpetrators. The co-editor of the second volume, Martin Dean, had previously worked as an investigator of Nazi war criminals. The overall aim of the series is to become the standard reference work for the Holocaust and other Nazi persecutions.

Originally, the editors planned to include about 5,000 sites of Nazi persecution, murder, and imprisonment. However, their estimate doubled by the next year. At an academic conference in 2013, Megargee and Dean said that they had uncovered more than 42,500 sites which will be covered in the encyclopedia, including 30,000 forced-labor camps, 1,150 ghettos, 980 concentration camps and subcamps, 1,000 prisoner-of-war camps, and 800 German military brothels. However, the figure of 42,500 is a considerable underestimate, because the researchers require multiple witness testimonies and documentary evidence to publish an entry on a site. Sites also must have housed at least 20 people and existed for more than a month.

The figure of 42,500 was soon picked up as a news story in the German- and English-language media because "new, more, larger—and, of course, Nazis" are "all the elements of a sensational headline", according to Dutch historian Robert Jan Van Pelt. Megargee remarked, "You could not turn a corner in Germany [during the war]... without finding someone there against their will." Dean commented, "To document this on a map and see how the Holocaust affected every single community throughout Europe makes quite clear the scope of the Nazi regime's murder campaign."

The first volume in the series, Early Camps, Youth Camps, and Concentration Camps and Subcamps under the SS-Business Administration Main Office (WVHA) was published in 2009, and the second volume, Ghettos in German-Occupied Eastern Europe, was published in 2012. Volume 3, Camps and Ghettos under European Regimes Aligned with Nazi Germany, was published in 2018. In 2017, the first two volumes of the series were released online for free download. The editors plan to complete the series of seven volumes in 2025, which will contain about 12,000 pages in thirteen separate books.

== Content ==
The entries are organized by region, following German administrative districts, and then alphabetically. Following each entry is a bibliography and a guide to archival sources. Entries are illustrated by historical photographs when available.

=== Volume I ===
Volume I covers the early camps that the Sturmabteilung (SA) and Schutzstaffel (SS) set up in the first year of the Nazi regime, and the camps later run by the SS Economic Administration Main Office (WHVA) and their numerous sub-camps. For historical context, the American historian Joseph Robert White provided an overview of the early camps, while German historian Karin Orth contributed a section on the history of the WHVA camps. She documents the rapid expansion of the concentration camp system, from 20,000 prisoners in August 1939 to more than 100,000 by the end of 1942, and 715,000 in January 1945, as many as half of whom died before liberation. Mass murder became an essential part of the camp system in late 1941, and forced labor and genocide intertwined. Despite Nazi orders aimed at improving the productivity of concentration camp labor, conditions remained deadly.

These essays are the only analysis presented in the volume; most of the content catalogues the camps, including locations, duration of operation, purpose, perpetrators and victims. The volume contains 1,100 entries written by 150 contributors. The volume covers both well-known camps such as Auschwitz II-Birkenau and lesser-known camps such as a labor camp at a Polish Catholic cemetery in Poznań, where Jewish prisoners were forced to smash headstones and dig up graves in search of gold and other valuables.

=== Volume II ===
Volume II, which profiles 1,150 ghettos in German-occupied Eastern Europe, was published in 2012. It is introduced by an essay by Christopher Browning, detailing the history and historiography of the ghetto system. Browning criticizes "the temptation to see Nazi ghettoization as a uniform, centralized and calculated preparatory step for the Final Solution", arguing that local conditions played a major role in the establishment of ghettos and that the ghettoization began before the Nazis planned to exterminate the Jews. The book does not include extensive survivor testimony, instead covering each ghetto from a variety of available sources and perspectives. Along with entries on the ghettos, the encyclopedia also contains extensive maps. Beyond the implementation of ghettoization, the entries also cover massacres, other atrocities, Jewish resistance, and rescue attempts.

=== Volume III ===
Volume III covers camps, ghettos, and other detention centers run by other Axis powers and allied and cobelligerent states, including the Slovak State, the Independent State of Croatia, the Italian Social Republic, Finland, Kingdom of Hungary, Kingdom of Bulgaria, Norway, Kingdom of Romania, and Vichy France. The encyclopedia also covers camps run by these allied countries in occupied territory, such as the Italian occupation zones of Greece, France, Albania, and Yugoslavia, and camps run by Vichy France and Italy in North and East Africa. Each country is introduced by an overview. The volume is noted for the diversity of perpetrators, victims, and the type of persecution.

=== Volume IV ===
The fourth volume, published in March 2022, covers thousands of camps operated by the German armed forces including the German military brothels. Many of these sites were little-known prior to the publication of the book, which the authors suggest will help dismantle the myth of the clean Wehrmacht.

=== Upcoming volumes ===
Future volumes will cover sites where non-Jews were persecuted, sites where Jews were persecuted, and sites where the Nazis exploited the forced labor of unwilling prisoners. This last category consists of an estimated 30,000 to 40,000 locations.

== Reception ==
=== Overall ===
A review by British historian Simone Gigliotti in the German Studies Review found that the encyclopedia is "a highly significant and overdue synthesis of existing documentary studies and specialized knowledge", although she notes it is not the first effort at a comprehensive reference on a Holocaust topic: previous multivolume encyclopedias had been published by Yad Vashem and the Deutsche Forschungsgemeinschaft. Samuel Kassow praised the bibliographical information in the book, writing that the encyclopedia is "a terrific resource for researchers" that "will stimulate further study". Van Pelt wrote that the encyclopedia's strengths included bringing together information from sources that were otherwise scattered, which is reflected in the "extensive annotation" and bibliographical information.

Both Gigliotti and Van Pelt questioned the utility of a paper encyclopedia, writing that this format would be underutilized in the Internet age, especially when online encyclopedias such as Wikipedia provide generally accurate, freely accessible content. However, Van Pelt wrote that print was a better medium for difficult-to-understand topics like the Holocaust. He reported that some survivors and their descendants had paid full price ($295.00) for the first volume of the encyclopedia because it "stands as a bulwark between their own memory and the denials" and controversies surrounding Holocaust history, by containing basic facts about locations of persecution. Noah Lederman, a grandson of a survivor, wrote in a Jewish Telegraphic Agency op-ed that his grandfather's testimony about a little-known forced-labor camp had been included in the encyclopedia:

To read these words reminded me that Poppy mattered, and that Karczew mattered. Every single one of these encyclopedia entries — chronicling the tens of thousands of places like Karczew — all matter. They will paint a picture of what was lost — and encourage remembering by all of us.

=== Volume I ===
According to Kassow, "one cannot ask for a better guide" to the Nazi concentration camps than this volume of the encyclopedia. He highlights the "wealth of detail" to be found in the book, including information on prisoners' daily lives, relations between prisoner categories, the death marches, and specifics about the companies involved in the Holocaust. A story in The New York Times noted that the encyclopedia also serves a practical purpose, in helping victims receive compensation for their imprisonment in previously unknown sites.

In an interview in Die Welt, Wolfgang Benz, the editor of a nine-volume German-language scholarly encyclopedia of the WHVA camps, Der Ort des Terrors, criticized the USHMM encyclopedia project. He said that it was "arrogant" to label the project an encyclopedia. Benz also accused the USHMM editors of copying his work and claimed that the encyclopedia was not based on original research, unfounded allegations according to Van Pelt. His criticism was interpreted by Van Pelt and German historian Marc Buggeln as being related to concern that the USHMM encyclopedia, which is more ambitious in scope, would overshadow Benz' work. According to Van Pelt, the two encyclopedias serve complementary goals.

=== Volume II ===
Van Pelt and German historian Klaus-Peter Friedrich compare Volume II to The Yad Yashem Encyclopedia of the Ghettos During the Holocaust, which covers similar territory. The Yad Vashem book has less detail on what took place during the war, instead emphasizing Jewish life before the war and continuity between the prewar community and the wartime ghetto. It also covers fewer locations, due to restricting its definition of a ghetto to places where a Jewish community existed before the war. Unlike the USHMM encyclopedia, the Yad Vashem encyclopedia did not cite sources, because it was based mostly on survivor testimony and Yizkor books. Van Pelt characterized the lack of continuity in the USHMM encyclopedia as its greatest omission.

American historian Waitman Wade Beorn praised the volume for its detailed coverage of the Holocaust in Eastern Europe, previously an under-studied topic. The "encyclopedia surpasses any other reference currently available" and the entries are "fantastically rich with information". He also commented that the encyclopedia charts the particulars of each victim's death or survival story, something that Beorn characterized as being more of an emphasis in recent scholarship. According to Beorn, the entries document not only "the complexity and variability" of ghettoization, but also the attention to detail of contributors and editors. Commenting on the large numbers of maps in the volume, he wrote that "the entries can be viewed as extensive collections of metadata for discrete geographical locations", providing the basis for thinking spatially about the Holocaust. Despite the high price of the encyclopedia, Beorn wrote, it was an essential purchase for academic libraries and scholars of the Holocaust.

== Awards ==
- 2009 National Jewish Book Award in the Holocaust category.

== Volumes ==
- Volume I: Early Camps, Youth Camps, and Concentration Camps and Subcamps under the SS-Business Administration Main Office (WVHA), 2009, ISBN 978-0-253-35328-3
- Volume II: Ghettos in German-Occupied Eastern Europe, 2012, ISBN 978-0-253-00202-0
- Volume III: Camps and Ghettos under European Regimes Aligned with Nazi Germany, 2018, ISBN 978-0-253-02386-5
- Volume IV: Camps and Other Detention Facilities Under the German Armed Forces, 2022, ISBN 978-0-253-06089-1
