= Peter Hayes (historian) =

American historian

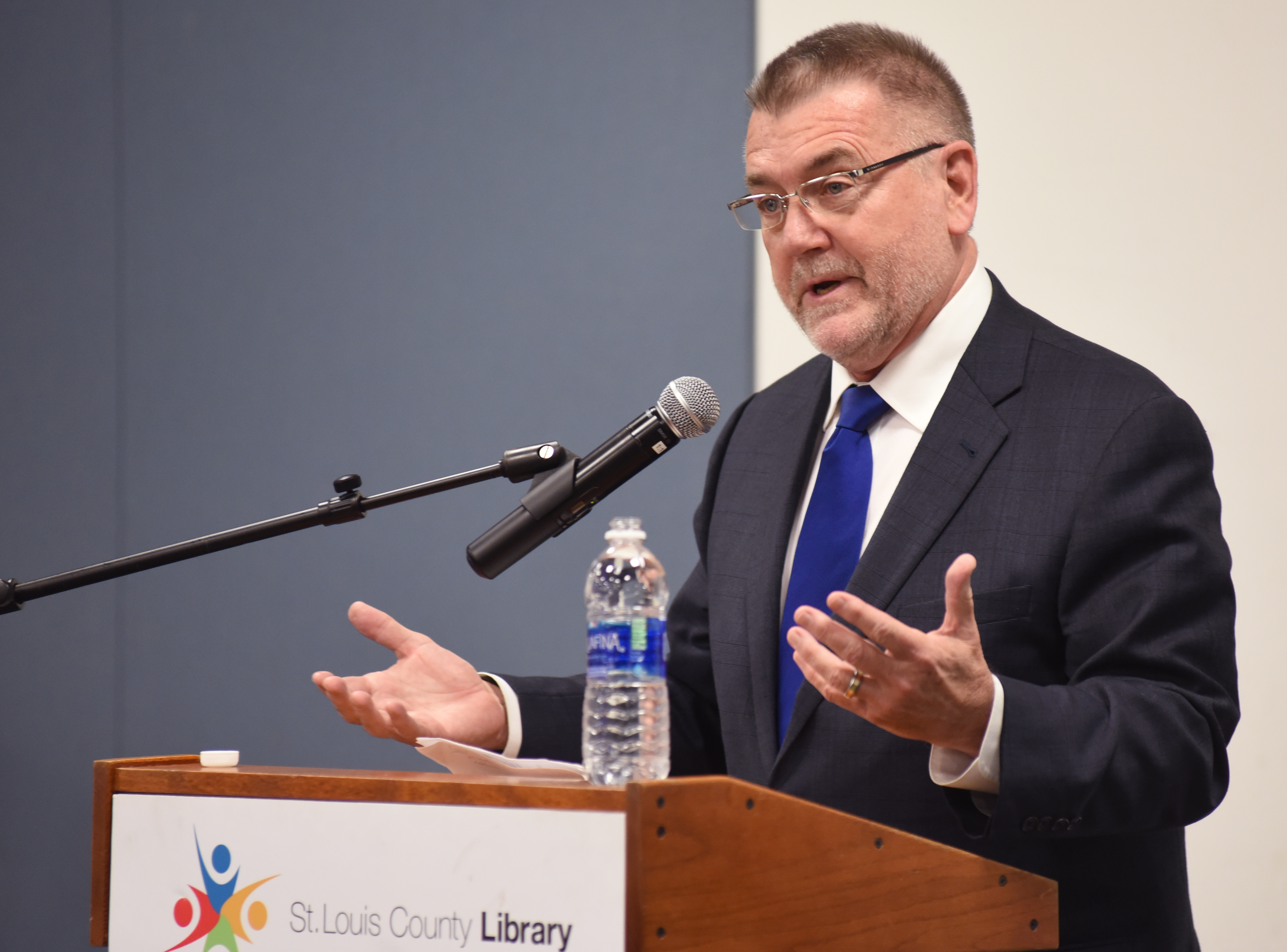
- Hayes at the St. Louis County Library, December 2017
- Education: AB (1968), government, Bowdoin College; BA (1971), MA (1976), PPE, Balliol College, Oxford; MA (1974), MPhil (1976), PhD (1982), history, Yale University
- Known for: Holocaust research
- Notable work: Industry and Ideology: IG Farben in the Nazi Era (1987)
- Website: peterfhayes.com

Peter F. Hayes (born 1946) is professor emeritus of history at the Weinberg College of Arts and Sciences, Northwestern University, and former chair of the Academic Committee of the United States Holocaust Memorial Museum.

Specializing in the Holocaust, genocide and the history of modern Germany, Hayes is the author or editor of 14 books, including Industry and Ideology: IG Farben in the Nazi Era (1987), a prize-winning study of the IG Farben corporation. He has been described as the leading scholar of the historiography of industry in Nazi Germany.

== Early life and education ==
Hayes was born in the Boston area to an Irish Catholic family; when he and his three siblings were older, his mother worked as a secretary for Honeywell. After attending middle and high school in Framingham, MA, Hayes completed his AB in government in 1968 at Bowdoin College, Brunswick, Maine, where he was supervised by John Rensenbrink for his senior thesis on African politics.

He had intended to study law but instead became interested in history after winning a Keasbey Scholarship to Balliol College, Oxford, where he studied Politics, Philosophy and Economics; he was taught German history at Oxford by Timothy Mason. He graduated from Oxford with a BA in 1971, then studied history at Yale University, where he was taught by Henry Ashby Turner, obtaining an MA in 1974, MPhil in 1976 and PhD in 1982.

== Career ==
Hayes began his first teaching job at Northwestern in 1980, before completing his PhD, and taught there continuously for 36 years, first as professor of history and German, then from 2000 to 2016 as Theodore Zev Weiss Holocaust Educational Foundation Professor. From 2009 until 2014 he was chair of Northwestern's history department.

His first book, Industry and Ideology: IG Farben in the Nazi Era (1987), a study of the relationship between the Nazi Party and IG Farben, a German chemical company, was awarded the Biennial Book Prize by the Conference Group for Central European History, American Historical Association.

In 2022, Hayes said he was “very concerned” about the normalization of antisemitism, noting the increased “public discussion of things that used to be beneath contempt”.

== Personal life ==
Hayes lives in Chicago with his husband, Voltaire Miran, and their miniature poodles, Boden and Bobsie.

== Selected works ==
- (1986) with Volker Durr and Kathy Harms, eds. Imperial Germany. Madison: University of Wisconsin Press.
- (1987) Industry and Ideology: IG Farben in the Nazi Era. Cambridge: Cambridge University Press.
- (1991), ed. Lessons and Legacies I: The Meaning of the Holocaust in a Changing World. Evanston, IL: Northwestern University Press.
- (1999), ed. Lessons and Legacies III: Memory, Memorialization and Denial. Evanston, IL: Northwestern University Press.
- (2002) with David Mickenberg and Corinne Granof, eds. The Last Expression: Art and Auschwitz. Block Museum.
- (2004) From Cooperation to Complicity: Degussa in the Third Reich. Cambridge: Cambridge University Press.
- (2010) with Eckart Conze, Norbert Frei and Moshe Zimmermann. Das Amt und die Vergangenheit: Deutsche Diplomaten im Dritten Reich und in der Bundesrepublik. Karl Blessing Verlag.
- (2010) with John K. Roth, eds. The Oxford Handbook of Holocaust Studies. New York: Oxford University Press.
- (2015), ed. How Was It Possible? A Holocaust Reader. Lincoln, NE: University of Nebraska Press.
- (2017) Why? Explaining the Holocaust. New York: W. W. Norton & Company.
- (2019) with Christopher Browning and Raul Hilberg, German Railroads, Jewish Souls: The Reichsbahn, Bureaucracy, and the Final Solution. New York: Berghahn Books.
- (2025) Profits and Persecution: German Big Business in the Nazi Economy and the Holocaust. Cambridge University Press.
