= Norbert Frei =

German historian (born 1955)

Norbert Frei (born March 3, 1955, in Frankfurt) is a German historian. He holds the Chair of Modern and Contemporary History at the University of Jena, Germany, and leads the Jena Center of 20th Century History. Frei's research work investigates how German society came to terms with Nazism and the Third Reich in the aftermath of World War II.

== Career ==
From 1973 to 1978 Frei studied modern history, political and communication sciences in Munich, where he also completed editorial training at the German School of Journalism. In 1979, he received his doctorate with a thesis on the "National Socialist conquest of the provincial press".

Between 1979 and 1997 he worked as a research assistant at the Institute of Contemporary History in Munich. While there, from 1987 he worked as an editorial member of quarterly periodicals for contemporary history and was editor of the series of quarterly issues. He was at Harvard University in 1985 and 1986, on a John F. Kennedy Fellowship.

After his time at Bielefeld University in 1996, he wrote a highly regarded study on the policies of the Adenauer era, in book form titled Vergangenheitspolitik: Die Anfänge der Bundesrepublik und die NS-Vergangenheit ("Adenauer's Germany and the Nazi Past: The Politics of Amnesty and Integration"). Frei joined the Ruhr University Bochum in 1997. For the summer semester 2005 he moved to the Friedrich Schiller University Jena. For the years 1995 and 1996 he was a freelance Fellow at the Berlin Institute for Advanced Study. For the years 2008 and 2009 he was a member of the Institute for Advanced Study in Princeton, N.J. In the academic. In year 2010/2011, he taught as Theodor Heuss Professor at the New School for Social Research in New York. In the summer semester of 2013, he held a visiting professorship at the Hebrew University of Jerusalem. In the summer semester of 2019, he was Gerda Henkel Visiting Professor in The Department of German Studies of Stanford University.

Frei is a member of numerous scientific advisory boards and commissions. From 1996 to 2003 and again since 2018 he worked on the Scientific Advisory Board of the Fritz Bauer Institute in Frankfurt. Since 1999 he is Chairman of the Scientific Board of Trustees of the Buchenwald and Mittelbau-Dora Memorials Foundation. From 2000 to 2016 Frei was a member of the Scientific Advisory Board of the Institute for German History at the University of Tel Aviv. From 2005 to 2017, he was chairman of the Scientific Advisory Council of the Koebner Minerva Center for German History at the Hebrew University of Jerusalem. From 1999 to 2002 he was a member of the Independent Historical Commission for the Study of the History of Bertelsmann in the "Third Reich". In 2011 Frei was elected as a full member of the Saxon Academy of Sciences and Humanities in Leipzig.

Frei's longer-term research projects concerned the practice of reparation in Germany and Israel since 1952 and the history of the Flick Group in the Third Reich, both completed in 2009. In 2005, German Foreign Minister Joschka Fischer appointed Frei to the Independent Commission of Historians - Foreign Office, which thoroughly examined the history of the Foreign Service in National Socialism and its handling of this past after 1945. In October 2010, the Commission published its findings as a book entitled The Office and the Past, followed by a controversial discussion. Larger ongoing research projects concern the history of political education in the Federal Republic and the experience of the long transformation in East Germany (1970-2010). Since 2012 Frei has led the interdisciplinary working group "Human Rights in the 20th Century" of the Fritz Thyssen Foundation, which also runs the website "Sources on the History of Human Rights".

Frei participated in numerous contemporary historical debates and endeavors to convey scientific findings to a broader public. Since 2016, he has written a column in the Süddeutsche Zeitung, a national daily newspaper.

== Controversy ==
In his 2000 book Standort-und Kommandanturbefehle des Konzentrationslagers Auschwitz 1940–1945 ("Auschwitz 1940-1945 Concentration Camp Commands and Command Orders"), Frei published a collection of documents from eastern European archives. In 2015, right-wing extremists and Holocaust deniers such as Ursula Haverbeck and Hans Püschel cherry-picked information from the book in order to argue that The Holocaust did not take place. In a 2015 television interview on the mainstream German ARD channel, Frei explained that the book contains a wealth of information about Auschwitz concentration camp and also Birkenau.

== Myth of the clean Wehrmacht ==
In 1997 Frei investigated how the myth of the clean Wehrmacht was created through the official policies of the West German government led by Konrad Adenauer. His book was called Vergangenheitspolitik: Die Anfänge der Bundesrepublik und die NS-Vergangenheit ("Adenauer's Germany and the Nazi Past: The Politics of Amnesty and Integration").

Frei wrote that the widespread demand for the freedom of Nazi war criminals in the aftermath of World War II was an indirect admission of the entire German society's enmeshment in Nazism. He added the war crimes trials were a painful reminder of the nature of the Third Reich that many ordinary people had identified with. In this context, there was an overwhelming demand for the rehabilitation of the Wehrmacht.

== Works ==
Monographs

- with Franka Maubach, Christina Morina and Maik Tändler: Zur rechten Zeit. Wider die Rückkehr des Nationalismus. Ullstein, Berlin 2019, ISBN 978-3-550-20015-1.
- (co-author) Michael Brenner (Hrsg.): Geschichte der Juden in Deutschland von 1945 bis zur Gegenwart. Politik, Kultur und Gesellschaft. Beck, Munich 2012, ISBN 978-3-406-63737-7.
- with Eckart Conze, Peter Hayes and Moshe Zimmermann: Das Amt und die Vergangenheit. Deutsche Diplomaten im Dritten Reich und in der Bundesrepublik. Blessing, Munich 2010, ISBN 978-3-89667-430-2; paperback edition: Pantheon, Munich 2012, ISBN 978-3-570-55166-0.
- with Ralf Ahrens, Jörg Osterloh and Tim Schanetzky: Flick. Der Konzern, die Familie, die Macht. Blessing, Munich 2009, ISBN 978-3-89667-400-5; Pantheon paperback, Munich 2011, ISBN 978-3-570-55143-1.
- 1968. Jugendrevolte und globaler Protest. dtv, Munich 2008, ISBN 978-3-423-24653-8.
- 1945 und wir. Das Dritte Reich im Bewußtsein der Deutschen. Beck, Munich 2005, ISBN 3-406-52954-2; dtv paperback, Munich 2009, ISBN 978-3-423-34536-1.
- with Saul Friedländer, Trutz Rendtorff, Reinhard Wittmann: Bertelsmann im Dritten Reich. 2 vols. Bertelsmann, Munich 2002, ISBN 3-570-00713-8 and ISBN 3-570-00711-1.
- (as editor and co-author) Hitlers Eliten nach 1945. Campus, Frankfurt am Main 2001, ISBN 3-593-36790-4; soft cover edition: dtv, Munich 2003; 9th edition Munich 2018, ISBN 3-423-34045-2.
- Vergangenheitspolitik. Die Anfänge der Bundesrepublik und die NS-Vergangenheit. Beck, Munich 1996, ISBN 978-3-406-41310-0. Many further editions. New edition: Beck, Munich 2012, ISBN 978-3-406-63661-5.
- with Johannes Schmitz: Journalismus im Dritten Reich. Becksche Reihe, Munich 1989, ISBN 3-406-33131-9. Many further editions.
- Der Führerstaat. Nationalsozialistische Herrschaft 1933–1945. dtv, Munich 1987, ISBN 3-423-04517-5. Many further editions.
  - Translated into English as: National Socialist Rule in Germany: The Führer State 1933–1945. Translated by Simon B. Steyne. Oxford, Blackwell Publishers 1993, ISBN 0-631-18507-0
- Amerikanische Lizenzpolitik und deutsche Pressetradition. Die Geschichte der Nachkriegszeitung Südost-Kurier (= Schriftenreihe der Vierteljahrshefte für Zeitgeschichte. Nr. 52). Oldenbourg, Munich 1986, ISBN 3-486-64552-8.
- Nationalsozialistische Eroberung der Provinzpresse. Gleichschaltung, Selbstanpassung und Resistenz in Bayern (= Studien zur Zeitgeschichte. vol. 17). DVA, Stuttgart 1980, ISBN 3-421-01964-9 (also Dissertation at the Ludwig-Maximilians-Universität München 1979).

Publications

- Wie bürgerlich war der Nationalsozialismus? Wallstein Verlag, Göttingen 2018, ISBN 978-3-8353-3088-7.
- Die Geschichte ist offen. In memoriam Fritz Stern. Wallstein Verlag, Göttingen 2017, ISBN 978-3-8353-3159-4.
- with Dominik Rigoll: Der Antikommunismus in seiner Epoche. Weltanschauung und Politik in Deutschland, Europa und den USA, Wallstein Verlag, Göttingen 2017, ISBN 978-3-8353-3007-8.
- Die Deutschen und der Nationalsozialismus. Munich 2015 ff., ISBN 978-3-406-67517-1 and ISBN 978-3-406-67515-7 (5 of 7 volumes released so far).
- with Annette Weinke: Toward a New Moral World Order? Menschenrechtspolitik und Völkerrecht seit 1945. Göttingen 2013, ISBN 978-3-8353-1305-7.
- with José Brunner, Constantin Goschler: Die Globalisierung der Wiedergutmachung. Politik, Moral Moralpolitik. Göttingen 2013, ISBN 978-3-8353-0981-4.
- with Wulf Kansteiner: Den Holocaust erzählen. Historiographie zwischen wissenschaftlicher Empirie und narrativer Kreativität. Wallstein Verlag, Göttingen 2013, ISBN 978-3-8353-1077-3.
- with Dietmar Süß: Privatisierung. Idee und Praxis seit den 1970er Jahren. Wallstein Verlag, Göttingen 2012, ISBN 978-3-8353-1086-5.
- with Martin Sabrow: Die Geburt des Zeitzeugen nach 1945. Wallstein Verlag, Göttingen 2012, ISBN 978-3-8353-1036-0.
- with Tim Schanetzky: Unternehmen im Nationalsozialismus. Zur Historisierung einer Forschungskonjunktur. Wallstein Verlag, Göttingen 2010, ISBN 978-3-8353-0755-1.
- with José Brunner, Constantin Goschler: Die Praxis der Wiedergutmachung. Geschichte, Erfahrung und Wirkung in Deutschland und Israel. Wallstein Verlag, Göttingen 2009, ISBN 978-3-8353-0168-9.
- Martin Broszat, der „Staat Hitlers“ und die Historisierung des Nationalsozialismus. Göttingen 2007, ISBN 978-3-8353-0184-9.
- Was heißt und zu welchem Ende studiert man Geschichte des 20. Jahrhunderts? Wallstein Verlag, Göttingen 2006, ISBN 3-8353-0136-5.
- Transnationale Vergangenheitspolitik. Der Umgang mit deutschen Kriegsverbrechern in Europa nach dem Zweiten Weltkrieg. Göttingen 2006, ISBN 3-89244-940-6.
- with Frank Bösch: Medialisierung und Demokratie im 20. Jahrhundert. Göttingen 2006, ISBN 3-8353-0072-5.
- with Volkhard Knigge: Verbrechen erinnern. Die Auseinandersetzung mit Holocaust und Völkermord. Munich 2002, ISBN 3-406-48204-X.
- with Sybille Steinbacher: Beschweigen und Bekennen. Die deutsche Nachkriegsgesellschaft und der Holocaust. Göttingen 2001, ISBN 3-89244-493-5.
- with Dirk van Laak, Michael Stolleis: Geschichte vor Gericht. Historiker, Richter und die Suche nach Gerechtigkeit. Munich 2000, ISBN 3-406-42155-5.
- with Sybille Steinbacher, Bernd C. Wagner: Ausbeutung, Vernichtung, Öffentlichkeit. Neue Studien zur nationalsozialistischen Lagerpolitik. Munich 2000, ISBN 3-598-24033-3.
- (co-editor) Standort- und Kommandanturbefehle des Konzentrationslagers Auschwitz 1940–1945. Munich 2000, ISBN 3-598-24030-9.
- Medizin und Gesundheitspolitik in der NS-Zeit. Munich 1991, ISBN 3-486-64534-X.
- with Hermann Kling: Der nationalsozialistische Krieg. Frankfurt am Main 1990, ISBN 3-593-34360-6.
- with Martin Broszat: Das Dritte Reich im Überblick. Chronik. Ereignisse. Zusammenhänge. Munich 1983, ISBN 3-492-11091-6; revised new edition 2007, ISBN 978-3-423-34402-9.
- with Franziska Friedlaender: Ernst Friedlaender. Klärung für Deutschland. Leitartikel in der ZEIT 1946–1950. Munich 1982
