= Lessons and Legacies =

Lessons and Legacies is a biannual conference in Holocaust studies organized by the Holocaust Educational Foundation and first held in 1989. The conference has produced more than ten volumes of conference proceedings, which are published by Northwestern University Press. Historian Anna Hájková writes that it is "widely acknowledged to be the central academic conference for Holocaust study and research".

== Volumes ==
- Hayes, Peter, ed. (1991). The Meaning of the Holocaust in a Changing World. Lessons and Legacies. Vol. I. Northwestern University Press. ISBN 978-0-8101-0955-1.
- Schilling, Donald G., ed. (1998). Teaching the Holocaust in a Changing World. Lessons and Legacies. Vol. II. Northwestern University Press. ISBN 978-0-8101-1563-7.
- Hayes, Peter, ed. (1999). Memory, Memorialization, and Denial. Lessons and Legacies. Vol. III. Northwestern University Press. ISBN 978-0-8101-0955-1.
- Thompson, Larry V., ed. (2003). Reflections on Religion, Justice, Sexuality, and Genocide. Lessons and Legacies. Vol. IV. Northwestern University Press. ISBN 978-0-8101-1989-5.
- Smelser, Ronald, ed. (2002). The Holocaust and Justice. Lessons and Legacies. Vol. V. Northwestern University Press. ISBN 978-0-8101-1915-4.
- Diefendorf, Jeffry, ed. (2004). New Currents in Holocaust Research. Lessons and Legacies. Vol. VI. Northwestern University Press. ISBN 978-0-8101-3117-0.
- Herzog, Dagmar, ed. (2006). The Holocaust in International Perspective. Lessons and Legacies. Vol. VII. Northwestern University Press. ISBN 978-0-8101-2371-7.
- Bergen, Doris L., ed. (2008). From Generation to Generation. Lessons and Legacies. Vol. VIII. Northwestern University Press. ISBN 978-0-8101-6245-7.
- Petropoulos, Jonathan; Rapaport, Lynn; Roth, John, eds. (2009). Memory, History, and Responsibility: Reassessments of the Holocaust, Implications for the Future. Lessons and Legacies. Vol. IX. Northwestern University Press. ISBN 978-0-8101-6416-1.
- Horowitz, Sara R., ed. (2012). Back to the Sources: Reexamining Perpetrators, Victims, and Bystanders. Lessons and Legacies. Vol. X. Northwestern University Press. ISBN 978-0-8101-2862-0.
- Earl, Hilary; Schleunes, Karl A., eds. (2014). Expanding Perspectives on the Holocaust in a Changing World. Lessons and Legacies. Vol. XI. Northwestern University Press. ISBN 978-0-8101-3091-3.
- Wendy Lower; Lauren Faulkner Rossi, eds. (2017). New Directions in Holocaust Research and Education. Lessons and Legacies. Vol. XII. Northwestern University Press. ISBN 978-0-8101-3449-2.
- Garbarini, Alexandra; Jaskot, Paul B., eds. (2018). New Approaches to an Integrated History of the Holocaust: Social History, Representation, Theory. Lessons and Legacies. Vol. XIII. Northwestern University Press. ISBN 978-0-8101-3768-4.
- Cole, Tim; Gigliotti, Simone, eds. (2020). The Holocaust in the Twenty-First Century; Relevance and Challenges in the Digital Age. Lessons and Legacies. Vol. XIV. Northwestern University Press. ISBN 978-0-8101-4274-9.
- Lessons and Legacies XV, The Holocaust: Global Perspectives and National Narratives, Washington University in St. Louis, November 2018
- Lessons and Legacies XVI: The Holocaust: Rethinking Paradigms in Research and Representation postponed to November 2021 due to COVID-19 pandemic

== Awards ==
Volume I won the Anisfield-Wolf Book Award for nonfiction in 1992.
