= Paul A. Shapiro =

American historian

Paul A. Shapiro is director of the United States Holocaust Memorial Museum's Center for Advanced Holocaust Studies. In 2010, he was presented with the Cross of the Order of Merit by the German Ambassador to the United States, Klaus Scharioth, at the German Embassy in Washington, D.C. The cross is Germany's highest civilian award.

== Selected publications ==
- The Kishinev Ghetto, 1941-1942: A documentary history of the Holocaust in Romania's contested borderlands. University of Alabama Press, 2015. ISBN 978-0817318642

== See also ==
- Martin C. Dean
- Kishinev Ghetto
