= Der Ort des Terrors =

Encyclopedia of Nazi concentration camps published between 2005 and 2009

- Volume four
- Edited by: Angelika Königseder
- Country: Germany
- Language: German
- Published: 2005-2009
- No. of books: 9

Der Ort des Terrors. Geschichte der nationalsozialistischen Konzentrationslager ("The Place of Terror. History of the National Socialist Concentration Camps") is a nine-volume German encyclopedia series of Nazi Germany's camp system, published between 2005 and 2009 by Wolfgang Benz and Barbara Distel for C. H. Beck. It was edited by Angelika Königseder of the Zentrum für Antisemitismusforschung.

The first volume deals with central issues concerning the Nazi camp system, volumes 2 to 7 contain articles on the main concentration camps and their subcamps in chronological order. Volume 8 deals with concentration and extermination camps in German-occupied Eastern Europe. Volume 9 also lists other types of camps in the Nazi forced labor camp system.

== Volumes ==
1. Die Organisation des Terrors. 2005. ISBN 3-406-52961-5.
2. Frühe Lager, Dachau, Emslandlager. 2005. ISBN 3-406-52962-3.
3. Sachsenhausen, Buchenwald. 2006. ISBN 3-406-52963-1.
4. Flossenbürg, Mauthausen, Ravensbrück. 2006. ISBN 3-406-52964-X.
5. Hinzert, Auschwitz, Neuengamme. 2007. ISBN 978-3-406-52965-8.
6. Natzweiler, Groß-Rosen, Stutthof. 2007. ISBN 978-3-406-52966-5.
7. Niederhagen/Wewelsburg, Lublin-Majdanek, Arbeitsdorf, Herzogenbusch (Vught), Bergen-Belsen, Mittelbau-Dora. 2008. ISBN 978-3-406-52967-2.
8. Riga, Warschau, Vaivara, Kaunas, Płaszów, Kulmhof/Chełmno, Bełzec, Sobibór, Treblinka. 2008. ISBN 978-3-406-57237-1.
9. Arbeitserziehungslager, Ghettos, Jugendschutzlager, Polizeihaftlager, Sonderlager, Zigeunerlager, Zwangsarbeiterlager. 2009. ISBN 978-3-406-57238-8.

== See also ==
- Encyclopedia of Camps and Ghettos, 1933–1945, a US-American encyclopedia with the same scope.
