= Geographies of the Holocaust =

2014 book

- First edition
- Language: English
- Genre: Non-fiction
- Publisher: Indiana University Press
- Publication date: 2014
- Publication place: United States

Geographies of the Holocaust is a 2014 book published by Indiana University Press, based on a 2007 conference of the same name at the Center for Advanced Holocaust Studies.
