= Sybille Steinbacher =

German historian

Sybille Steinbacher is a German historian. Since May 2017 she has been Professor of Holocaust Studies at Goethe University Frankfurt.

Steinbacher is the author of several works on the Holocaust, including Musterstadt Auschwitz: Germanisierungspolitik und Judenmord in Ostoberschlesien (2010) and Auschwitz: A History (2005). She was a residential fellow of the United States Holocaust Memorial Museum from October 2012 to June 2013, and has served as Professor of Dictatorship, Violence and Genocide Comparative Studies at the University of Vienna. Her appointment by Goethe University Frankfurt in December 2016 made her Germany's first Professor of Holocaust Studies. She also became director of the university's Fritz Bauer Institute.

== Publications ==
=== Monographs ===
- Dachau: Die Stadt und das Konzentrationslager in der NS-Zeit, Untersuchung einer Nachbarschaft. (Münchner Studien zur neueren und neuesten Geschichte. vol. 5). Frankfurt: Fritz Lang, 1993, ISBN 3-631-46682-X. (M.A. Thesis, Ludwig-Maximilians-Universität München)
- „Musterstadt“ Auschwitz: Germanisierungspolitik und Judenmord in Ostoberschlesien (Darstellungen und Quellen zur Geschichte von Auschwitz. Bd. 2). Saur, Munich 2000, ISBN 3-598-24031-7 (Ph.D., Bochum University, 1998).
- with Saul Friedländer, Norbert Frei, Trutz Rendtorff and Reinhard Wittmann: Bertelsmann im Dritten Reich. Munich: Bertelsmann, 2002, ISBN 3-570-00711-1.
- Auschwitz: Geschichte und Nachgeschichte (Beck’sche Reihe. 2333). Munich: Beck, 2004, ISBN 3-406-50833-2.
- Wie der Sex nach Deutschland kam: Der Kampf um Sittlichkeit und Anstand in der frühen Bundesrepublik. Munich: Siedler, 2011, ISBN 978-3-88680-977-6 (Jena University, Habilitation, 2009).
- with Norbert Frei, Saul Friedländer and Dan Diner: Ein Verbrechen ohne Namen: Anmerkung zum neuen Streit über den Holocaust. Munich: C.H. Beck, 2022, ISBN 978-3-406-78449-1.

=== Editor ===
- with Norbert Frei, Thomas Grotum, Jan Parcer and Bernd C. Wagner: Standort- und Kommandanturbefehle des Konzentrationslagers Auschwitz. 1940–1945 (Darstellungen und Quellen zur Geschichte von Auschwitz. vol. 1). Munich: Saur, 2000, ISBN 3-598-24030-9.
- with Norbert Frei and Bernd C. Wagner: Ausbeutung, Vernichtung, Öffentlichkeit. Neue Studien zur nationalsozialistischen Lagerpolitik (Darstellungen und Quellen zur Geschichte von Auschwitz. vol. 4). Munich: Saur, 2000, ISBN 3-598-24033-3.
- with Norbert Frei: Beschweigen und Bekennen: Die deutsche Nachkriegsgesellschaft und der Holocaust (Dachauer Symposien zur Zeitgeschichte, vol. 1). Göttingen: Wallstein, 2001, ISBN 3-89244-493-5.
- Volksgenossinnen. Frauen in der NS-Volksgemeinschaft (Beiträge zur Geschichte des Nationalsozialismus. vol. 23). Göttingen: Wallstein, 2007, ISBN 978-3-8353-0188-7.
- Transit US-Zone. Überlebende des Holocaust im Bayern der Nachkriegszeit (Dachauer Symposien zur Zeitgeschichte, vol. 13). Göttingen: Wallstein, 2013, ISBN 978-3-8353-1344-6.
- with Nikolaus Wachsmann: Die Linke im Visier. Zur Errichtung der Konzentrationslager 1933. Göttingen: Wallstein, 2014, ISBN 978-3-8353-1494-8.
- with Frank Bajohr: „... Zeugnis ablegen bis zum letzten“. Tagebücher und persönliche Zeugnisse aus der Zeit des Nationalsozialismus und des Holocaust (Dachauer Symposien zur Zeitgeschichte. vol. 15). Göttingen: Wallstein, 2015, ISBN 3-8353-1742-3.
