= KL – A History of the Nazi Concentration Camps =

Book by Nikolaus Wachsmann, 2015

KL: A History of the Nazi Concentration Camps
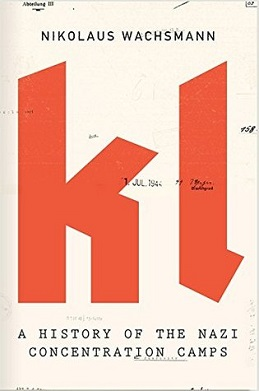
- First edition
- Author: Nikolaus Wachsmann
- Language: English
- Genre: Holocaust studies
- Published: New York
- Publisher: Little, Brown Book Group, Farrar, Straus and Giroux
- Publication date: 2015
- ISBN: 9780374118259
- OCLC: 908628850
- Website: us.macmillan.com/books/9780374535926

KL: A History of the Nazi Concentration Camps is a 2015 book by Birkbeck College professor Nikolaus Wachsmann.

== Title ==
The book is named after the SS abbreviation, KL, for Konzentrationslager, the German word for "concentration camp". Another abbreviation, KZ, was used by prisoners and others informally, and eclipsed the popularity of KL in German after the war. (Note: Nikolaus Wachsmann (KL: A History of the Nazi Concentration Camps, 2015): "The term "KL" remained the main SS abbreviation for concentration camps throughout the Third Reich. For popular references to "KL", see The Times, January 24, 1935, NCC, doc. 277. Prisoners also applied the term, though they more commonly used the harsher sounding "KZ", which became the standard abbreviation in postwar Germany (Kamiński, Konzentrationslager, 51; Kautsky, Teufel, 259; Kogon, SS-Staat, 1946, 4). Still, some survivors (Internationales Lagerkommitee Buchenwald, KL BU) and scholars (Herbert at al., Konzentrationslager) continued to use "KL". In this book, "KL", or concentration camp, normally refers to SS camps under the authority of the IKL (from 1934) and WVHA (from 1942); at times, I also use the generic "camps" to refer to these sites.") According to Harold Marcuse, "the official Nazi abbreviation ... was guarded like a trademark by the system's potentate, Heinrich Himmler, who did not want competing camps outside of his system." Wachsmann chose the original acronym to "reveal the system as seen by its contemporaries", Marcuse writes. The book's epigram is a quotation from the Sonderkommando prisoner Zalman Gradowski: "May the world at least behold a drop, a fraction of this tragic world in which we lived."

== Contents ==
The book dispels the idea that German people were ignorant of what went on in the concentration camps. For example, some of the first concentration camps set up in 1933 were deliberately located in working-class neighborhoods of Berlin so that the population would learn what happened to Nazi opponents. It also corrects misunderstandings that all concentration camps were similar. In fact, there was great diversity in them, especially between standard concentration camps and the extermination camps. Wachsmann argues that the concentration camps were only peripheral to the Final Solution, because most Jewish victims of the Holocaust died in shootings, gas vans, or dedicated extermination camps rather than in the concentration camp system. Although Jews made up a majority of deaths in concentration camps, they ranged from 10–30% of the population depending on the time period.

Throughout the book, Wachsmann presents a generalization and then complicates the picture with counterexamples. The book is a work of synthetic history drawing mainly on published German sources, although it also incorporates the author's archival research. His approach is "integrated history" which attempts to create a full picture of events by examining them from all perspectives and contexts. Wachsmann argues that there were no "typical" prisoners, kapos, or guards.

Wachsmann ends the book with a vignette about Moritz Choinowski, a Polish Jew liberated by the United States Army at Dachau. Choinowski had survived more than 2,000 days in concentration camps and wondered to another liberated prisoner, "Is this possible?"

== Reception ==
The book was described as "prodigious but eminently readable" in a review by Harold Marcuse in American Historical Review. According to Joanna Bourke, Wachsmann's book is a "significant [contribution] to our understanding of early-20th-century history." She credits Wachsmann for being obsessed with precision and "a stickler for dates and times". Thomas W. Laqueur considers the book "world-making history".

In The Guardian, Nicholas Lezard described the book as "a huge and necessary contribution to our understanding of this chilling subject". He describes the book as both panoptic and intimate, in that it gives the big picture while humanizing the story with anecdotes. According to a review by Keith Kahn-Harris in The Independent, the book "renders the unimaginable evil of the camps relatable".

== Awards ==
- 2016 Jewish Quarterly-Wingate Prize
- 2016 Mark Lynton History Prize
- 2016 Wolfson History Prize
