= Hitler's Prisons =

2004 book by Nikolaus Wachsmann

- Author: Nikolaus Wachsmann
- Publication date: 2004

Hitler's Prisons: Legal Terror in Nazi Germany is a 2004 book by Nikolaus Wachsmann, a modern European history professor. Wachsmann argues that the Nazi judiciary played a key role in Nazi terror. The prison systems inflicted harsh punishments against Jews, homosexuals and Jehovah's Witnesses while enforcing Nazi racial policies. Wachsmann describes how law enforcement promoted the Nazi and terror acts in Germany before and during World War II and each chapter describes a specific topic relating to political prisoner terror. The book illuminates the bureaucratic and institutional history of prisons and the history of inmates themselves.
