= Martin C. Dean =

Research scholar

Martin Christopher Dean (born 1962) is a research scholar at the Center for Advanced Holocaust Studies, United States Holocaust Memorial Museum. He formerly worked as an historian at the Metropolitan Police War Crimes Unit, Scotland Yard.

Dean was born in London on March 14, 1962. He received a Doctor of Philosophy in history from Queens' College, Cambridge.

== Selected publications ==
=== Books ===
- Collaboration in the Holocaust: Crimes of the local police in Belorussia and Ukraine, 1941–1944. Palgrave Macmillan, 2000. ISBN 0333688929
- Confiscation of Jewish property in Europe, 1933–1945, new sources and perspectives. Center for Advanced Holocaust Studies, 2003. (Foreword with Paul A. Shapiro)
- Robbery and restitution: The conflict over Jewish property in Europe. Berghahn Books, 2007. ISBN 978-1845450823 (Editor with Constantin Goschler and Philipp Ther)
- Robbing the Jews: The confiscation of Jewish property in the Holocaust, 1933-1945. Cambridge University Press, 2008. ISBN 978-0521888257
- The United States Holocaust Memorial Museum Encyclopedia of Camps and Ghettos, 1933–1945: Ghettos in German-occupied Eastern Europe Volume II. Indiana University Press, 2012. ISBN 978-0253355997 (volume editor)
- Investigating Babyn Yar. Shadows from the Valley of Death. Lanham: Lexington Books. 2023. ISBN 978-1-66694-139-5.

=== Essays ===
- "The German Gendarmerie, the Ukrainian Schutzmannschaft and the 'Second Wave' of Jewish Killings in Occupied Ukraine: German Policing at the Local Level in the Zhitomir Region, 1941-1944". German History. 14 (2): 168–192. 1996. doi:10.1093/gh/14.2.168.
- Martin, Dean C. (2004). "Local Collaboration in the Holocaust in Eastern Europe". In Stone, Dan (ed.). The Historiography of the Holocaust. London: Palgrave Macmillan.
- "German Ghettoization in Occupied Ukraine: Regional Patterns and Sources" (PDF), The Holocaust in Ukraine: New Sources and Perspectives. Conference Presentations, occasional paper, Washington, D.C.: Center for Advanced Holocaust Studies, United States Holocaust Memorial Museum, pp. 63–89, 2013
- "Forced Labor Camps for Jews in Reichskommissariat Ukraine: The Exploitation of Jewish Labor within the Holocaust in the East". Eastern European Holocaust Studies. 1 (1): 175–196. 2022. doi:10.1515/eehs-2022-0002.

== Awards ==
- 2008: National Jewish Book Award in the Writing Based on Archival Material category for Robbing the Jews
