= Wolfgang Sofsky =

German sociologist

Wolfgang Sofsky (born 1952) is a German sociologist and former professor of sociology at University of Göttingen and Erfurt University.

== Works ==
- Sofsky, Wolfgang (2008). Privacy: A Manifesto. Princeton University Press. ISBN 978-0-691-13672-1.
- Sofsky, Wolfgang (2009). Das Buch der Laster (in German). C.H.Beck. ISBN 978-3-406-62528-2.
- Sofsky, Wolfgang (2013) [1993]. The Order of Terror: The Concentration Camp. Princeton University Press. ISBN 978-1-4008-2218-8.
