= Karin Orth =

German historian (born 1963)

Karin Orth (born 1963) is a German historian, known for her research into the Nazi concentration camps.

== Works ==
- Herbert, Ulrich; Orth, Karin; Dieckmann, Christoph, eds. (1998). Die nationalsozialistischen Konzentrationslager: Entwicklung und Struktur (in German). Wallstein Verlag. ISBN 978-3-89244-289-9.
- Orth, Karin (1999). Das System Der Nationalsozialistischen Konzentrationslager: Eine Politische Organisationsgeschichte [The National Socialist Concentration Camp System: A Political Organizational History] (in German). Hamburger Edition. ISBN 978-3-930908-52-3.
- Orth, Karin (2013) [2000]. Die Konzentrationslager-SS: Sozialstrukturelle Analysen und biographische Studien [The Concentration Camp SS: Social Structural Analysis and Biographical Studies] (in German). Wallstein Verlag. ISBN 978-3-8353-2030-7.
- Orth, Karin (2016). Die NS-Vertreibung der jüdischen Gelehrten: die Politik der Deutschen Forschungsgemeinschaft und die Reaktionen der Betroffenen (in German). Wallstein-Verlag. ISBN 978-3-8353-1863-2.
- Orth, Karin (2018). Vertreibung aus dem Wissenschaftssystem: Gedenkbuch für die im Nationalsozialismus vertriebenen Gremienmitglieder der DFG (in German). Franz Steiner Verlag. ISBN 978-3-515-11953-5.
