= Holocaust Educational Foundation =

U.S. nonprofit organization

Holocaust Education Foundation
- HEF logo
- Abbreviation: HEF
- Established: 1976; 50 years ago
- Founder: Theodore Zev Weiss
- Founded at: Skokie, Illinois
- Type: Nonprofit
- Purpose: education
- Location: Evanston, Illinois, USA
- Fields: the Holocaust
- Director: Sarah Cushman
- Parent organization: Northwestern University

The Holocaust Educational Foundation (HEF) is a nonprofit organization founded by Theodore Zev Weiss in 1976 and dedicated to the support of teaching and research about the Holocaust at the university level. A part of Northwestern University since 2013, HEF has helped create curriculum materials about the Holocaust in use at more than 400 colleges.

== History ==
A survivor of the Auschwitz concentration camp, Weiss founded HEF in 1976 to record the testimonies of Holocaust survivors. In 1988, HEF provided funding to establish a course at Northwestern University called The History of the Holocaust, and thereafter HEF's mission evolved into the development of Holocaust-related teaching materials. Weiss perceived that, while many states, like Illinois, mandate instruction in the Holocaust, "the state doesn't prepare teachers to teach. This is a very difficult subject, and not having the tools, the teachers are sort of at a loss." On July 9, 2013, the HEF was integrated into Northwestern University. The HEF donated $1 million to Northwestern University and pledged to donate another $5 million to endow the program permanently.

== Programming ==
The Holocaust Educational Foundation of Northwestern University offers several programs: the Summer Institute on the Holocaust and Jewish Civilization; the biennial Lessons and Legacies conference; the Sharon Abramson Research Grants; and teaching grants to support college-level teaching in Holocaust Studies.

== See also ==
- Holocaust Studies and Materials
- Polish Center for Holocaust Research
