= Slave Labor in Nazi Concentration Camps =

2014 book by Marc Buggeln

- Author: Marc Buggeln
- Language: English
- Genre: History
- Publisher: Oxford University Press
- Publication date: 2014

Slave Labor in Nazi Concentration Camps is a book by German historian Marc Buggeln which deals with the forced labor that prisoners had to perform in Nazi concentration camps. The book, which primarily deals with Neuengamme concentration camp and its subcamps, was published in 2014 by Oxford University Press.
