= Maik Tändler =

German historian

Maik Tändler (born in 1979) is a German historian.

== Life and work ==
Maik Tändler was born in Kassel in 1979. He obtained a doctorate from the University of Göttingen in 2015. He has researched German psychology and psychotherapy in the 1970s as cultural history, which was the subject of his PhD dissertation and a 2016 monograph. He has studied the intellectual history of the political right and radical right in Germany. In 2025, he published a monograph about Armin Mohler, a central person of the post-war German New Right, as well as the intellectual milieu around him and how contemporary right-wingers continue to build on his work.

== Selected publications ==
Monographs

- Das therapeutische Jahrzehnt. Der Psychoboom in den siebziger Jahren, Göttingen 2016.
- Zur rechten Zeit. Wider die Rückkehr des Nationalismus, Berlin 2019 (with Norbert Frei, Franka Maubach and Christina Morina).
- Armin Mohler und die intellektuelle Rechte in der Bonner Republik, Göttingen 2025.

Edited volumes

- Das beratene Selbst. Zur Genealogie der Therapeutisierung in den ‚langen‘ Siebzigern, Bielefeld 2011 (with Sabine Maasen, Jens Elberfeld and Pascal Eitler).
- Das Selbst zwischen Anpassung und Befreiung. Psychowissen und Politik im 20. Jahrhundert, Göttingen 2012 (with Uffa Jensen).
- In der NS-Zeit verfolgte Abgeordnete des saarländischen Landtags. Ein Handbuch, Göttingen 2023.
