= Paul B. Jaskot =

Historian and professor at Duke University

Paul B. Jaskot (born 1963) is a historian and professor at Duke University. His research interests include architectural history, urban planning, and Nazi Germany.

== Works ==
- Jaskot, Paul B. (2002). The Architecture of Oppression: The SS, Forced Labor and the Nazi Monumental Building Economy. Routledge. ISBN 978-1-134-59461-0.
- Rosenfeld, Gavriel D.; Jaskot, Paul B., eds. (2008). Beyond Berlin: Twelve German Cities Confront the Nazi Past. University of Michigan Press. ISBN 978-0-472-03631-8.
- Jaskot, Paul B. (2012). The Nazi Perpetrator: Postwar German Art and the Politics of the Right. University of Minnesota Press. ISBN 978-1-4529-4822-5.
