= Nikolaus Wachsmann =

German-British historian (born 1971)

- Born: Nikolaus Daniel Wachsmann; 1971 (age 54–55); Munich, Bavaria, West Germany
- Awards: Gladstone History Book Prize (2004); Jewish Quarterly-Wingate Prize (2016); Mark Lynton History Prize (2016); Wolfson History Prize (2016)

Academic background
- Education: London School of Economics (BSc); University of Cambridge (MPhil); Birkbeck, University of London (PhD)
- Thesis: Reform and Repression: Prisons and Penal Policy in Germany, 1918–1939 (2001)
- Academic advisor: Richard J. Evans

Academic work
- Discipline: Modern European history, penology, Nazi concentration camps
- Institutions: University of Cambridge; University of Sheffield; University of London
- Notable works: Hitler's Prisons (2004); KL: A History of the Nazi Concentration Camps (2015)

Nikolaus Daniel Wachsmann (born 1971) is a professor of modern European history in the Department of History, Classics and Archaeology at Birkbeck College, University of London.

== Academic career ==
Wachsmann was born in Munich. He graduated from the London School of Economics with a Bachelor of Science (BSc) degree, from the University of Cambridge with a taught Master of Philosophy (MPhil) degree, and from the University of London with a Doctor of Philosophy (PhD) degree. His doctoral thesis, which he completed in 2001, was titled "Reform and Repression: Prisons and Penal Policy in Germany, 1918–1939".

In October 1998, Wachsmann began his academic career as a research fellow at Downing College, Cambridge. He was then a lecturer at the University of Sheffield. In 2005, he joined the Department of History, Classics and Archaeology of Birkbeck, University of London.

He is the author of the 2004 book, Hitler's Prisons: Legal Terror in Nazi Germany and the 2015 book KL: A History of the Nazi Concentration Camps.

He is currently writing a new history of Auschwitz.

== Personal life ==
Wachsmann resides in Liverpool.

== Awards and honours ==
- 2004 Royal Historical Society Gladstone History Book Prize, winner for Hitler's Prisons: Legal Terror in Nazi Germany
- 2016 Jewish Quarterly-Wingate Prize, winner for KL: A History of the Nazi Concentration Camps
- 2016 Mark Lynton History Prize, winner for KL: A History of the Nazi Concentration Camps
- 2016 Wolfson History Prize, winner for KL: A History of the Nazi Concentration Camps

== Selected publications ==
- KL: A History of the Nazi Concentration Camps (New York, London, 2015)
- Die Linke im Visier. Zur Errichtung der Konzentrationslager 1933 (Göttingen, 2014), co-edited with Professor Sybille Steinbacher
- The Nazi Concentration Camps, 1933–1939: A Documentary History (Lincoln, 2012), co-edited with Dr. Christian Goeschel
- Concentration Camps in Nazi Germany: The New Histories (London, 2010), co-edited with Professor Jane Caplan
- "Before the Holocaust: New Approaches to the Nazi Concentration Camps, 1933–1939", special issue of Journal of Contemporary History 45 (2010), Nr. 3, co-edited with Dr. Christian Goeschel
- Hitler's Prisons: Legal Terror in Nazi Germany (New Haven: Yale University Press, 2004).
