= Indiana University Press =

Academic publisher at Indiana University

- Parent company: Indiana University
- Founded: 1950
- Country of origin: United States
- Headquarters location: Bloomington, Indiana
- Distribution: Hopkins Fulfillment Services (North America); Combined Academic Publishers Ltd (Europe, Asia, Middle East, Africa, Asia Pacific, Australia and New Zealand)
- Publication types: Books, academic journals
- Imprints: Quarry Books, Red Lightning Books
- Official website: iupress.org

Indiana University Press, also known as IU Press, is an academic publisher founded in 1950 at Indiana University that specializes in the humanities and social sciences. Its headquarters are located in Bloomington, Indiana. IU Press publishes approximately 70 new books annually, in addition to 38 academic journals, and maintains a current catalog comprising some 2,000 titles.

Indiana University Press primarily publishes in the following areas: African, African American, Asian, cultural, Jewish, Holocaust, Middle Eastern studies, Russian and Eastern European, and women's and gender studies; anthropology, film studies, folklore, history, bioethics, music, paleontology, philanthropy, philosophy, and religion. IU Press undertakes extensive regional publishing under its Quarry Books imprint.

== History ==
IU Press began in 1950 as part of Indiana University's post-war growth under President Herman B Wells. Bernard Perry, son of Harvard philosophy professor Ralph Barton Perry, served as the first director. IU Press's first book was a translation of Edouard de Montulé's Travels in America, 1816–1817, published in March 1951. A total of six books were published the first year.

In 1952, IU Press earned full membership with the Association of American University Presses (now known as the "Association of University Presses"). During its first decade in operation, IU Press published more than 200 books. That same decade, in 1955, it published Rolfe Humphries's translation of the Metamorphoses of Ovid, IU Press's all-time bestseller, having sold more than 500,000 copies to date.

Bernard Perry retired as director in 1976 and was replaced by John Gallman who focused on the academic strengths of Indiana University. The IU Press Journals Division, launched in 1987 with three journals, now carries 38 in its 2023 portfolio. By the end of John Gallman's tenure as director in 2000, IU Press published 150 books annually and in 2022, the press maintains an annual output of approximately 100–120 scholarly books per year.

In 2004 IU Press launched Quarry Books, an imprint dedicated to regional topics. It launched Red Lighting Books, another imprint, that focuses on food and drink, lifestyle, travel, sports, the Midwest, and true crime.

== Honors and awards ==
In 1965, IU Press received the Centennial Medal, the highest prize of the U.S. Civil War Centennial Commission, for its role in preserving Civil War history. IU Press's 1967 translation of volume 1 of Kierkegaard's Journals and Papers won a National Book Award. It was followed by a second National Book Award in 1970 for a translation of Bertolt Brecht's Saint Joan of the Stockyards. In 2009 Indiana University Press publication The United States Holocaust Memorial Museum Encyclopedia of Camps and Ghettos, 1933–1945, Volume I was selected as the winner of the 2009 National Jewish Book Award in the Holocaust category.

In a ranking of scholarly publishers in political science, IUP ranked 28th among all scholarly publishers by respondent preferences for publishers whose books they read or rely upon for the best research in political science.

== See also ==
- List of English-language book publishing companies
- List of university presses
