= Postenpflicht =

Nazi policy against insubordinate prisoners

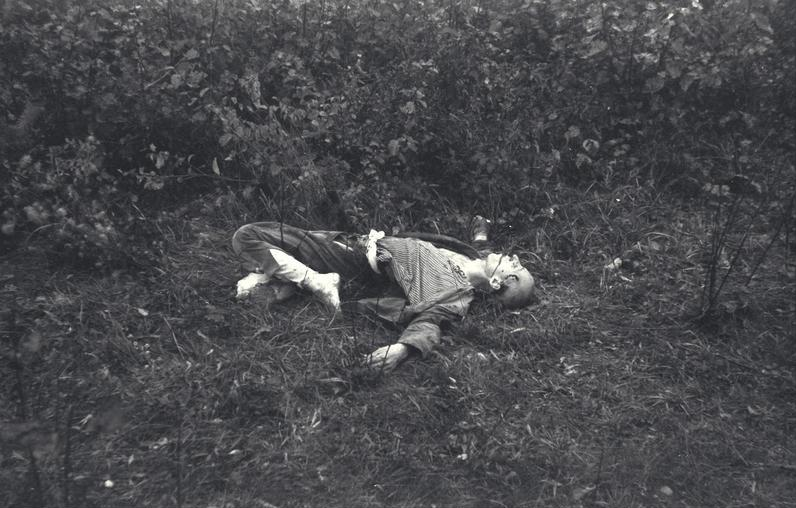
A prisoner who was shot and killed at Mauthausen-Gusen concentration camp complex.

The Postenpflicht (German: "Duty of guards") was a general order issued to SS-Totenkopfverbände guards in Nazi concentration camps to summarily execute insubordinate prisoners. The order required guards to shoot prisoners who engaged in resistance or escape attempts, without warning; failing to do so would result in dismissal or arrest. The Postenpflicht was originally issued on October 1, 1933, for guards at Dachau concentration camp, but was later extended to other concentration camps.

== Background ==
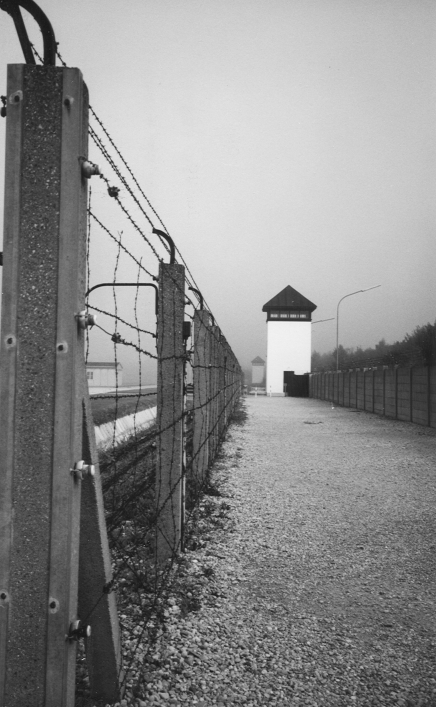
Fence and guard watch tower at Dachau

Dachau concentration camp opened on March 22, 1933, near the town of Dachau, about 16 km (10 mi) northwest of Munich in the state of Bavaria. Initially the camp used local Munich policemen as guards, but within weeks they were replaced by the SS. On April 13, 1933, Hilmar Wäckerle, an SS-Standartenführer, became the first commandant. Wäckerle was instructed by Heinrich Himmler, then-Munich chief of police and Obergruppenführer of the SS, to draw up a set of regulations for discipline in the camp. Wäckerle's rules were extremely harsh, and several prisoners died as a direct result of their punishment.

In May 1933, the Munich prosecutor's office, not yet assimilated to Nazi policy in the Gleichschaltung process, began investigating the murder of several prisoners at Dachau, prompted by the formal complaint of Sophie Handschuh, who wanted to know the true cause of her son's death at the camp. Rumors were already widespread about harsh treatment of those under detention and Himmler was forced to refute those claims, even while announcing the opening of Dachau. Wäckerle and Himmler had charges of murder filed against them, prompting Wäckerle to be removed from his position, but these were later dropped after the chief prosecutor and his assistant were each transferred to other offices. Himmler continued his efforts to establish summary execution, then in practice only at Dachau, as a legitimate form of punishment.

== New camp order ==
Theodor Eicke was commissioned to develop a new camp order and a new regulations handbook. (Note: Disciplinary procedures were added later to the regulations called the "Inspection of the concentration camps".) He wrote the Postenpflicht with instructions to fire on prisoners immediately and "without warning". Refusal to obey this order would bring serious consequences for camp personnel: summary dismissal and even arrest.

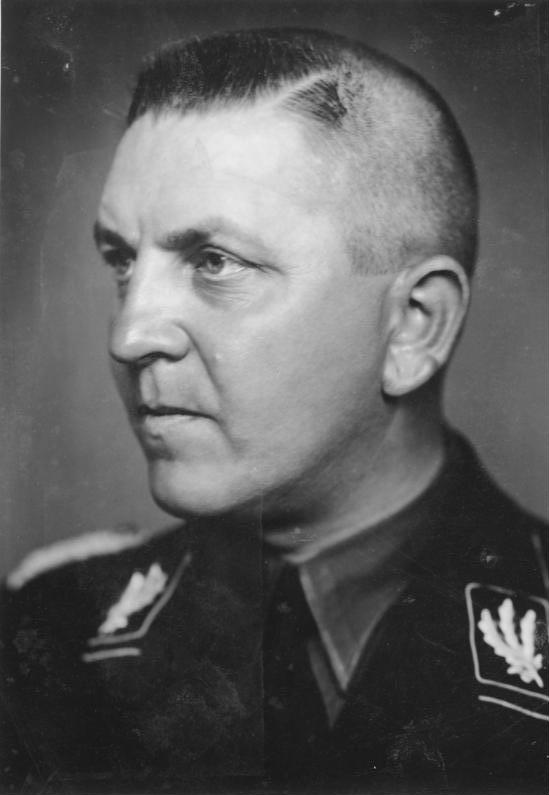
Concentration Camp Inspector Theodor Eicke

The "Regulations for Prisoner Escorts and Guards" (Dienstvorschrift für die Begleitpersonen und Gefangenenbewachung) were dated and went into effect on October 1, 1933. The infamous Lagerordnung, the "Disciplinary and Penal Code for the Prison Camp" were issued on the same date. Also known as the Strafkatalog ("Penalty Catalogue"), this list of rules, infractions and punishments went into effect immediately, as well and both sets of regulations were made effective at all the SS concentration camps a few months later, on January 1, 1934. Together, the regulations allowed guards to mete out harsh punishments for even minor infractions and gave them wide latitude to execute prisoners and over time, devolved into a general system of terror punishment.

The perimeter of the detention camp grounds was marked by electrified fences and walls. Alongside the wall was a moat and next to that was an area called the "neutral zone". Dubbed the "death strip" by prisoners, it was a forbidden area. A prisoner who even went near this area risked being shot by a guard invoking the Postenpflicht. Guards who shot a prisoner received a bounty and three days off. Guards, for their amusement and profit, would throw a prisoner's cap into the "death zone" and order the prisoner to get it "on the double" and then shoot the prisoner. They sometimes did this in pairs because they received a bounty for shooting a prisoner, so they would take turns in order to both get the bounty. Witnesses and former prisoners have also reported cases where prisoners intentionally walked into the forbidden zone, to escape the camp through death.

Prisoner work details outside a concentration camp were called Außenkommandos ("outside commandos") by the SS. The SS guards would form a Postenkette, a cordon of guards to surround the work site and maintain watch. The imaginary boundary formed by the cordon was not to be crossed by a prisoner. Stepping outside the boundary was treated as an escape attempt and the guards, adhering to the Postenpflicht, were to fire without warning. If a prisoner did manage to escape, the SS guard was charged with "negligent release of a prisoner".

The Postenpflicht was also valid for the SS-Totenkopfverbände that came to the concentration camps to serve as guards and auxiliary police. (Note: Not just the SS-Death's Head Units, but also other SS men were employed as concentration camp guards, especially around the end of the war.) During the war years, female guards were also employed at concentration camps. As overseers, they were also ordered to use their firearms in the case of physical attack by a prisoner or an escape attempt.

Reich Minister of Justice Franz Gurtner was in contact with Reichsführer-SS Himmler to mitigate the Postenpflicht a bit, but he was unable to accomplish anything.

Camp commandants were also held accountable to the Postenpflicht. Karl Otto Koch was commandant at Majdanek concentration camp and on July 14, 1942, during his tenure, 200 Soviet prisoners of war escaped. Only half were later recaptured. In August 1942, Koch was charged with "negligent release of a prisoner" and was reprimanded with a disciplinary transfer to the lesser job of Postschutz in Eger.

== The "Postenpflicht" order ==
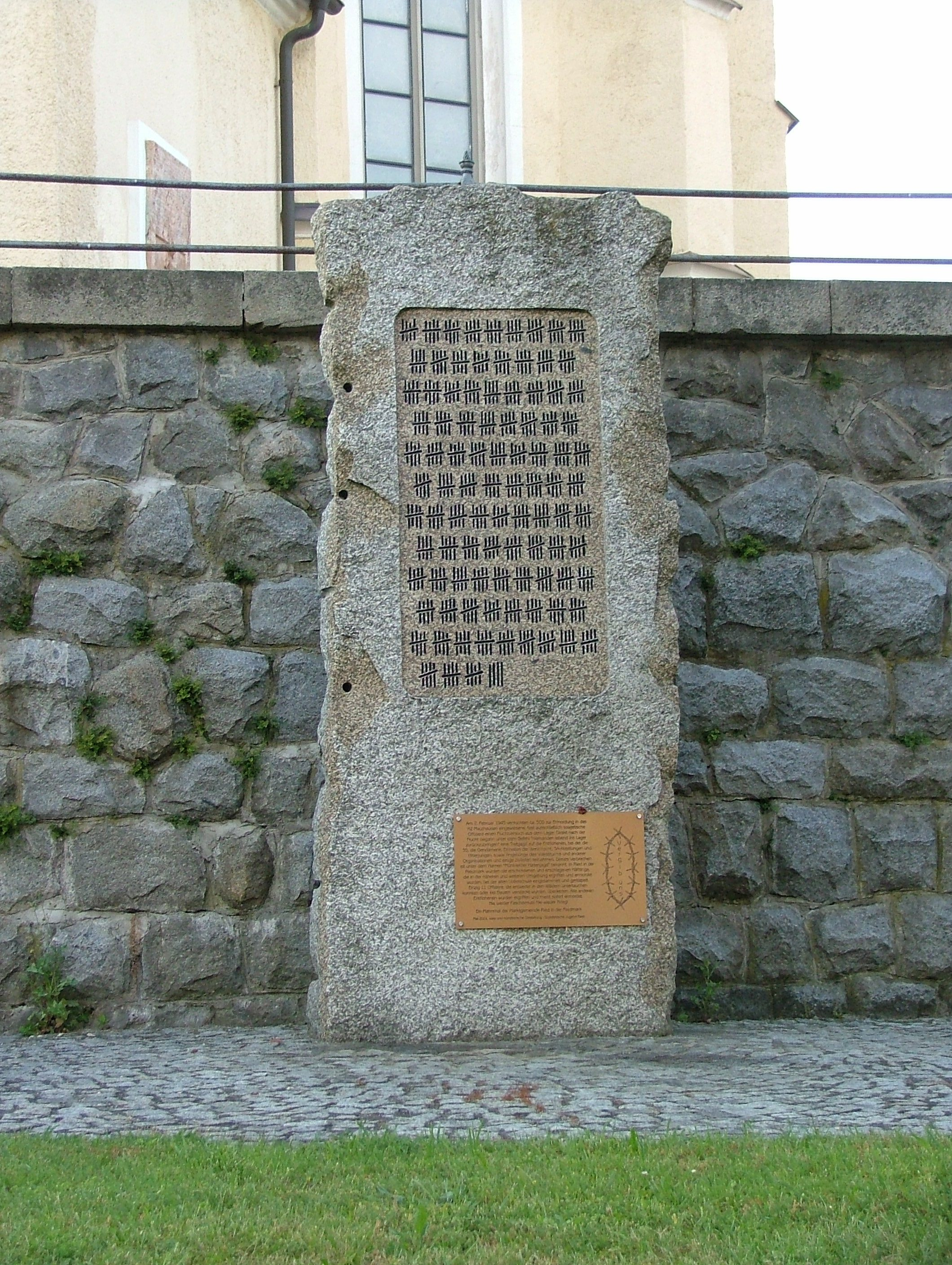
Monument for the Mühlviertler Hasenjagd

Dachau concentration camp

Headquarters, Oct. 1, 1933

Regulations for Prisoner Escorts and Guards

6. Postenpflicht

Whoever allows a prisoner to escape will be arrested and charged with Negligent Prisoner Release and handed over to the Bavarian Political Police.

If a prisoner attempts to escape, he is to be shot, without warning. A guard who shoots an escaping prisoner in the course of carrying out his duty, will not be reprimanded.

Where a guard is physically attacked by a prisoner, the attack is to be repelled with use of a firearm, not return physical violence. A guard who does not comply with this order should expect his immediate dismissal. Besides, he who "keeps his back free" (Note: The original German is an idiom. To "keep one's back free" (den Rücken freihalten) means to get the grunt work out of the way so one is freed up for more important things.) will rarely be attacked.

In the event of a revolt or organized prisoner resistance, every guard supervising is to fire upon them. Warning shots are strictly prohibited.

== See also ==
- Schießbefehl
- Negligence
- Kangaroo court
- Concentration Camps Inspectorate
- Treblinka resistance, August 1943
- Sobibór rebellion, October 1943
- Mühlviertler Hasenjagd, February 1945
- Celler Hasenjagd, April 1945
- German war crimes
- Prisons in Germany (about German prisons today)

== Sources ==
- Lothar Gruchmann, Justiz im Dritten Reich 1933 - 1940 About the Franz Gürtner era of adapting and submitting to Nazism. (in German)
