= Concentration Camps Inspectorate =

SS administrative authority for concentration camps

- Gestapo headquarters on Prinz-Albrecht-Straße in Berlin, 1933. The CCI moved into these offices in May 1934

Operation
- Formed: May 1934
- Disbanded: 1945

The Concentration Camps Inspectorate (CCI) or in German, IKL (Inspektion der Konzentrationslager; German: [ɪnspɛkˈt͡si̯oːn deːɐ̯ kɔnt͡sɛntʁaˈt͡si̯oːnsˌlaːɡɐ]) was the central Schutzstaffel (SS) administrative and managerial authority for the concentration camps of the Third Reich. Created by Theodor Eicke, it was originally known as the "General Inspection of the Enhanced SS-Totenkopfstandarten", after Eicke's position in the SS. It was later integrated into the SS Main Economic and Administrative Office as "Amt D".

== Inspector of all concentration camps ==
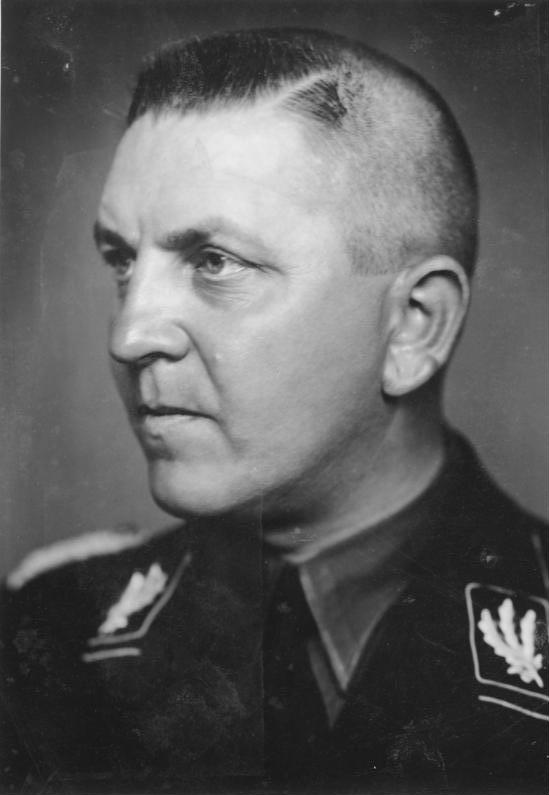
Concentration Camp Inspector Theodor Eicke

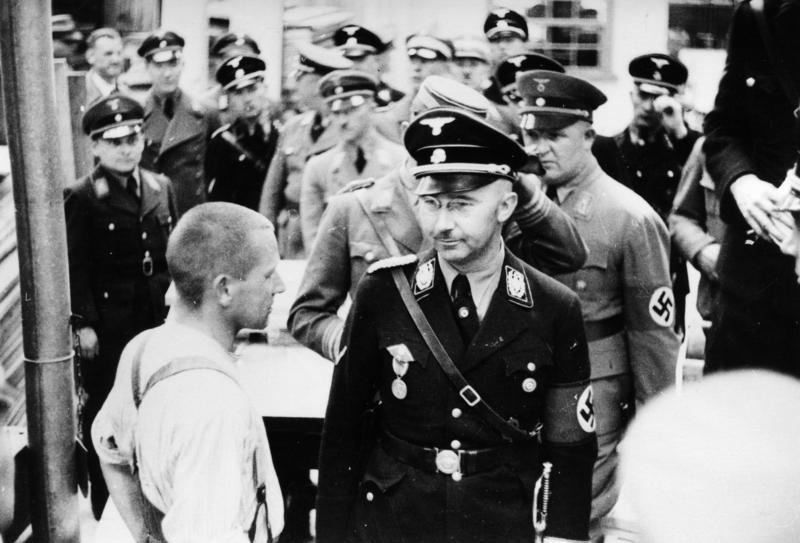
Inspection by the Nazi party and Himmler at Dachau on 8 May 1936.

SS-Oberführer Theodor Eicke became commandant of Dachau concentration camp on 26 June 1933. His form of organization at Dachau stood as the model for all later concentration camps. Eicke claimed the title of "Concentration Camps Inspector" for himself by May 1934. As part of the disempowerment of the SA through murder during the "Night of the Long Knives", he had personally shot Ernst Röhm on 1 July 1934.

Shortly after the Röhm affair on 4 July 1934, Reichsführer-SS Heinrich Himmler officially named Eicke chief of the Inspektion der Konzentrationslager—IKL (Concentration Camps Inspectorate or CCI). He also promoted Eicke to the rank of SS-Gruppenführer in command of the SS-Wachverbände. Himmler was unquestionably the master of the police organizations and the associated camps, but only those places under the official jurisdiction of the CCI were considered "concentration camps" within the territory comprising the Third Reich. (Note: Historian Nikolaus Wachsmann avows that while Himmler provided the "general direction for the later SS camp system," it was Eicke who "became its powerful motor.")

As a result of the Night of the Long Knives, the remaining SA-run camps were taken over by the SS. The factional police functions of the SS were dissolved on 20 July 1934 with the subordination of the SA. Additionally, the Concentration Camps Inspectorate (CCI) was officially established as a department for Eicke. The CCI moved into offices at Gestapo headquarters on Prinz-Albrecht-Strasse 8 in Berlin. (Note: This site is today the location of Topography of Terror, a Holocaust memorial and museum.) While the offices of Reinhard Heydrich's police apparatus was in close physical proximity to the CCI office of Eicke, Himmler kept them distinct and separated; Heydrich policed the Reich, arrested and detained people and then sent them to concentration camps, where the inmates were superintended by the CCI under Eicke. The CCI was subordinate to the SD and Gestapo only in regards to who was admitted to the camps and who was released; what happened inside the camps was at the discretion of the CCI.

The head of the CCI (first Eicke) was subordinate both to the SS-Amt as an SS member but really only reported directly to the Chief of the German Police, Reichsführer-SS Himmler in this role. This form of dual subordination was characteristic of many SS posts and created free room for interpretation for their members, which is how and why the CCI under Eicke became an institution of both the Nazi Party and the state. Eicke had a free hand in bringing the concentration camps to the highest "level of efficiency"; he especially knew how to use this system for his own ends and contributed significantly to the CCI having sole control of all concentration camp prisoners.

== Inspectorate from 1934 to 1945 ==
In 1934, the CCI under Eicke was operating outward from Dachau. Changes and reorganization of the many camps were on the horizon. Under Eicke's direction, the smaller detention centers and punitive facilities throughout Germany were consolidated into five principal camps at Esterwegen, Lichtenburg, Moringen, Sachsenburg, and Dachau. The SS camp guards of the CCI came from all walks of life; there were men, women, Germans, non-Germans, Protestants, Catholics, other religious faiths, elderly soldiers, young men, army conscripts, ideologues, sadistic killers, and those who treated inmates humanely. In 1936, the concentration camp guards and administration units were formally designated as the SS-Totenkopfverbände (Death's Head Troops; SS-TV). In April 1936, Eicke was named commander of the SS-Totenkopfverbände and the number of men under his command increased from 2,876 to 3,222; the CCI was also provided official funding through the Reich's budget office, and Eicke was allowed to recruit future troops from the Hitler Youth based on regional needs.

The CCI's leader, Eicke, advocated for a tight-knit group. He also did his best to instill a sense of loyalty within the SS men assigned to the camps, encouraging "bombast, bravado, and deadly earnestness" in carrying out their duties. As the camps expanded into the mid-1930s, so did the number of personnel assigned to the CCI. Eicke's most important subordinate, beginning in 1936, was Richard Glücks. On 1 April 1936, Glücks was named by Eicke military chief of staff of the Inspector of the Wachverbände and later became Eicke's deputy. Many of the administrative duties at the CCI that Eicke preferred to ignore were assumed by Glücks, which over time led to his usurping significant amounts of authority; Glücks subsequent rise to prominence within the Nazi ranks had more to do with Eicke's "ineffectual management" of clerical responsibilities than Glücks' competence.

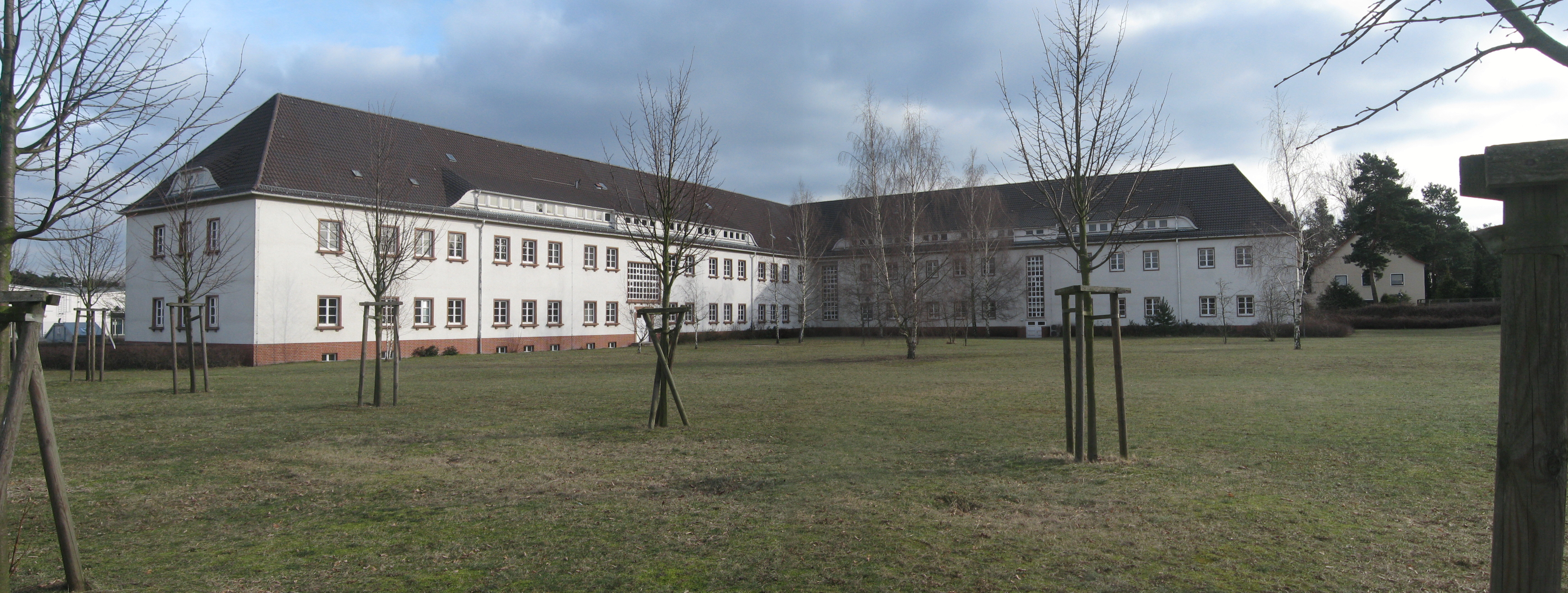
The T-building in Sachsenhausen concentration camp, home of the Concentration Camps Inspectorate from 1938

Ideological training intensified under Eicke's command and military training for new recruits working the camps was increased. Sometime in August 1938, Eicke's entire support staff was moved to Oranienburg (near Sachsenhausen) where the CCI's main office would remain until 1945. Nonetheless, Eicke's role as the chief of the CCI placed him within the framework of Heydrich's secret state police; whereas his command of the Death's Head units, made him accountable to the Reich Security Main Office (RSHA) of the SS. All SS camps' regulations, both for guards and prisoners, followed the Dachau camp model established by Eicke. On 1 April 1937, the SS leadership consolidated the CCI's primary organization, the Death's Head Battalion, into three units; the first for service at Dachau, the second at Sachsenhausen, and the third at Buchenwald. Then during the autumn of 1938, a fourth unit was created for the latest concentration camp at Mauthausen. The CCI also administered the Columbia-Haus concentration camp in Berlin-Tempelhof. One of the CCI's original camps, Lichtenburg (which housed mostly women), was closed in May 1939 when Ravensbrück concentration camp became operational. Secrecy increased among the guards and CCI staff as the number of camps and the supporting network expanded. New camps were "largely shielded from sight" and established in remote places. The war contributed to this expansion as the camp system itself grew to support the Nazi territorial occupation with corresponding rapidity. Just one day after invading Poland (2 September 1939) for instance, the Nazis established the Stutthof concentration camp near Danzig.

At the beginning of World War II, Eicke was reassigned to the front, to be the commander of the SS-Totenkopf-Standarten. Eicke's Waffen-SS unit carried-out policing duties, deportations, and even executions through 1940 and into 1941, a function that was in accordance with the Nazi regime's ethnic and political goals. Glücks was appointed the new CCI chief by Himmler in mid-November 1939. Glücks made few changes, leaving the organizational structure intact as Eicke had set it up. By 1940, the CCI came under the control of the Verwaltung und Wirtschaftshauptamt Hauptamt (VuWHA; Administration and Business office) which was set up under Oswald Pohl. Then in 1942, the CCI became Amt D (Office D) of the consolidated main office, known as the SS Main Economic and Administrative Office (SS-Wirtschafts-Verwaltungshauptamt; WVHA). Therefore, the entire concentration camp system was placed under the authority of the WVHA with the CCI now subordinated to the Chief of the WVHA.

Near the end of 1941 and beginning of 1942, it was decided that to support the Nazi war machine, concentration camp prisoners should be put to work in armaments factories. Competing interests and SS beliefs placed the leadership of the WVHA and the CCI at odds with one another, particularly concerning slave labor; namely as Eicke thought of concentration camp inmates more along punitive politico-ideological lines, whereas Pohl viewed prisoners within the camps as economic fodder to be fully exploited, especially in cases where they possessed needed industrial skills or expertise. Conflicts between the WVHA and the CCI only proved deadly to the prisoners due to the fact that both organizations were equally reckless and inconsiderate to the needs of their slave-labor force. Since the inception of the concentration camp system, Pohl had been trying to influence the administration of them. He succeeded, in part, because while camp commandants handled the discipline of SS members under them, they were not actually their superiors. The SS camp members received their instructions from the CCI (later "Amt D"), through their SS camp department heads. This is another example of the SS practice of dual subordination.

Except for the admittance and release of concentration camp prisoners, which the SD and Gestapo handled (later as departments of the RSHA), the CCI had sole control over the prisoners. The CCI made all decisions regarding internal camp matters. The CCI also coordinated the operations for systematic murder in other SS divisions, for example, the murder of Soviet commissars, and the T4 killing operations like Action 14f13. Auschwitz-Birkenau and Majdanek concentration camps were under the CCI, having been especially built for use as extermination camps in the Final Solution. Perhaps unique in part due to the scope of its operations, Auschwitz-Birkenau was concomitantly under the jurisdiction of the WVHA and within the administrative control of the CCI.

== SS hierarchy inside the camps ==
=== Divisions and duties ===
The Politische Abteilung ("political department"), which controlled the lives of prisoners at each camp, became the most important subdivision within the CCI.

Under Eicke's direction, all new concentration camps were organized along the "Dachau model". Principally, this meant the segregation of SS members from among the guards or those working in the commandant's department. Within the commandant's department, the same sections were formed, building a core command structure that was replicated at each camp; the basic division of the command staff remained in force in every concentration camp until the collapse of Nazi Germany.

- Commandant / Adjutant
- Political Department
- Protective Custody Camp (Note: Protective custody served two purposes according to Himmler; first it protected the population from those the Nazis arrested, and those detained were "protected" from the population. In the upside down world of the Nazis, persons being held in protective custody could upon their release sign a statement that read, "I am aware that I may at any time apply for a further period of protective custody if I consider my physical well being to be in jeopardy." Given the periodic and arbitrary violence of anti-Semites and other radicalized supporters of the regime, this gave the practice of placing people in detention a semblance of legality and consideration. Reality was much different.)
- Administration
- Camp Doctor
- Guard Command

A seventh branch, the Arbeitseinsatz (labor allocation), was added to the standard camp organization at the beginning of the 1940s.

=== Duties of the Schutzhaftlagerführer ===
The Schutzhaftlagerführer (head of the "preventive detention camp") was the commandant's deputy, and he and his adjutant were responsible for the operation of the camp. The Schutzhaftlagerführer had to maintain order, discipline and cleanliness, take care of daily routines, roll calls and so on. Under him were the Rapportführer, the Arbeitseinsatzführer and the Oberaufseherin (if there was a women's camp). They were directly responsible for order in the camp and they assigned prisoners to the outside work details. The Blockführer, each of whom were responsible for one or more barracks, were subordinate to them. The Arbeitseinsatzführer (head of "work details") was responsible for prisoner work details, both at the camp and outside and making use of professional skills and abilities. The Arbeitseinsatzführer had every prisoner in the camp listed in a card file by profession and skill.

Subordinate to him, was the Arbeitsdienstführer (an SS-Unterführer) who was responsible for assembling and supervising the "internal command", the prisoner functionaries. A Lagerältester ("camp elder") assisted the Schutzhaftlagerführer and through him controlled the Blockälteste ("barracks elders") and, in some camps, the Stubendienst ("room duty" prisoners), while a prisoner-staffed Schreibstube (orderly room) provided clerical support and an Arbeitsstatistik office under the Arbeitseinsatzführer did the actual work of assigning prisoners to details. By delegating defined administrative and guard duties to selected inmates, the SS made the prisoner functionaries an instrument of control, shifting the terror onto the prisoner groups themselves. The SS took pains to ensure that they operated as spies and became the instruments of its crimes, even as they themselves lived under constant threat.

=== Duties of the political department ===
The political department (Politische Abteilung) handled the admission and release of prisoners, their initial registration, transfer, interrogations and criminal investigations, and camp security; it also ran the camp prison, the so-called Bunker, to which inmates were sent for special punishment. It was responsible for records about prisoners, police comments about the death or escape of a prisoner, investigations (which most often involved torture or threats), and keeping prisoner card files up to date. The head of the political department was always an officer from the Gestapo, generally an officer from the Kriminalpolizei ("criminal police"). He was subordinate to the local Gestapo headquarters, but often received instructions and orders from the RSHA, generally the office involved with matters related to "protective custody". For example, execution orders went directly from the RSHA office to the Politische Abteilung and the RSHA decreed individual admissions and release of protective custody prisoners. Admission and release were in fact the only matters the CCI itself did not decide; before the war that authority rested with the Political Police, and from September 1939 with the newly formed RSHA.

=== Duties of the administration department ===
The administration department (Verwaltung) was responsible for housing, food, clothing and remuneration of the command staff and guards, as well as for housing, feeding and clothing the prisoners, and it supervised such facilities as the internal camp workshops, the kitchens and the laundries. Its remit extended to the prisoners' possessions, building maintenance, camp vehicles and the food supply, making it the economic heart of the camp organization; because it controlled all material goods, it was also the principal site of corruption and misappropriation, and its decisions on whether winter clothing and new shoes were issued and what reached the kitchens made it directly responsible for hunger among the prisoners. It was the chief accounting clerk in a commercial enterprise, responsible for the verification of all material goods and their current status and the management and upkeep of its real property; its authority rested not upon violence or discipline, as elsewhere in the camp, but upon its monopoly over everything material within the perimeter. The department answered to Amt D IV of the WVHA, the administrative office charged among other matters with clothing the prisoners and headed by Wilhelm Burger; labour allocation, by contrast, fell to Amt D II under Gerhard Maurer, a former commercial executive drawn from the German Equipment Works in a deliberate attempt to infuse the Inspectorate with modern business administration.

An important office of the administrative department was the Gefangeneneigentumsverwaltung, the "prisoners' property management", which was responsible for holding all the personal property brought to the camps by the prisoners, for sorting, bundling and storing the prisoners' money, valuables, "civilian" clothing and so on. This department was held responsible for the assets; embezzlement or misappropriation was disciplined and offenders could be held criminally liable, though the severity of the prescribed penalties did little to suppress a traffic that pervaded daily camp life. Investigations mounted by the SS and the police courts foundered accordingly, the older camp personnel closing ranks against them while the leadership of the WVHA shielded its own. Accomplices among the prisoners were liquidated before they could testify, and proceedings were commonly dismissed or simply allowed to lapse.

=== Duties of the chief physician ===
The medical department (Medizinische Abteilung) administered care to SS personnel and—to a far less effective degree—to the prisoners. In the larger camps, it comprised one or more doctors together with SS medics (Sanitätsdienstgrade). Subordinate to the head of the Sanitätswesen stood the camp doctors together with the orderlies and clerks of the infirmary, a hierarchy of personnel correspondingly resistant to control from the commandant's office. Medical care of the prisoners ranked well below the department's governing charges for camp hygiene or the containment of epidemics, each of which stood subordinate to preserving the inmates' capacity for work. Direct contact with prisoners as patients nonetheless remained rare, the SS shunning the camp hospital for fear of contagion.

In addition, camp doctors had different non-medical or pseudo-medical tasks, such as selections at arriving transports with new prisoners and in the infirmary (deciding who was fit to work and who should be killed), supervision of gassing procedures, supervision of the removal of dental gold from dead prisoners' mouths, certification of death after executions, especially murders committed by the camp Gestapo, performing abortions and sterilizations on prisoners, as well as taking part in pseudo-scientific human experiments. Distinguished from the flogging guards by professional training and social origin, the SS physicians as a rule did not themselves beat prisoners; they killed by experiment, by injection, by gas, or by the withholding of assistance when it was needed. Once prisoner labor had become central to the war economy, the WVHA explicitly required the camp doctors and commandants to bring the death rate down.

== Management ==
In a study, historian Karin Orth established that the management level at the concentration camps (commandants and division heads) repeatedly were recruited from a small group of SS members. Excluding the approximately 110 camp doctors, who were subject to a bit more fluctuation, this group numbered about 207 men and a few women. Orth showed numerous similarities within this group, including social background, path of life, year of birth (around 1902), the date they joined the SS and their political development. In January 1945, there were 37,674 men and 3,508 women working as concentration camp guards.

=== Rotation ===
By 1944, it became standard practice to rotate SS members in and out of the camps, partly based on manpower needs, but also to provide easier assignments to wounded Waffen-SS members who could no longer serve at the front. Job rotation between concentration camps and the Waffen-SS is estimated to have involved at least 10,000 men and some historians think the number of personnel rotated between the two duties could be as high as 60,000. This exchange of staff in particular refutes the claim that the Waffen-SS had no connections with the SS guards of the concentration camps. Nearly everyone serving in the SS knew what was going on inside the concentration camps, making the entire organization liable for war crimes and crimes against humanity.

== Procedures for punishing violations ==
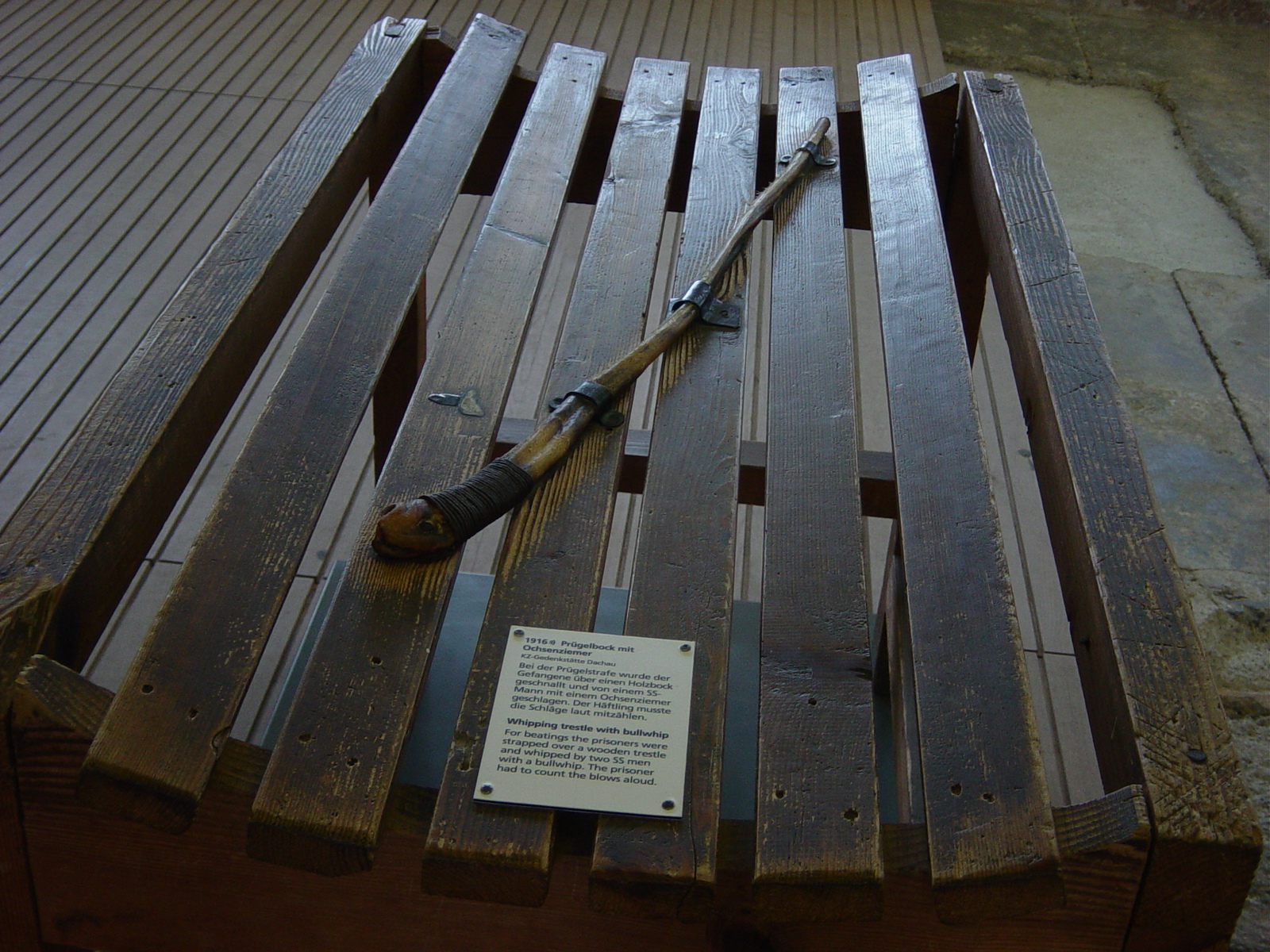
Punishment horse, Dachau concentration camp

The CCI set uniform guidelines for the punishment of violations, enabling Himmler to insist, for purposes of Nazi propaganda, that a proper procedure was in place for the punishment of violations at concentration camps. Adherence to the guidelines was rare, however. Dachau was the first systematically organized concentration camp of the National Socialists, and the detailed regulations Eicke drew up there—his "Disciplinary and Punishment Orders for the Prison Camp", which regulated the methods of torture to be used as punishment and the methods of execution—were subsequently adopted in all the other concentration camps. They stipulated extreme penalties for the slightest infractions and prescribed, among other punishments, 25 blows with a bullwhip or cane administered on the Prügelbock, isolation in dark cells and, for certain offenses, execution. Since Dachau was set up as the model camp, other camps' procedure for punishing violations followed the example of Dachau.

The punishment of a violation began with the "violations report". A prisoner could be punished for violations related to camp order, such as missing a button on his jacket, for a dish that wasn't washed well enough. The SS man noted the prisoner number on the violations report. Under Egon Zill, for example, prisoner functionaries, such as the Lagerälteste, were instructed to deliver some 30–40 violations daily to the SS. If a group of prisoners collectively violated a camp regulation, the entire group would have to kneel and then be beaten, for example. If they didn't call the name of any individual prisoner, then all the names would be noted on the violations report. Work crews were searched before and after work for contraband, such as a cigarette butt. The penalty for smaller things was corporal punishment or excessive exercise. A more serious violation, such as sabotage or theft could merit a "special treatment". After a violation report, the prisoner had to wait in limbo while the report was processed before finding out what his punishment would be, sometimes resulting in weeks or months of uncertainty.

If a citation came back, the prisoner had to report for roll call and wait. The hearing took place in the Jourhaus. If the prisoner denied his guilt, he was often accused of lying, which meant additional flogging. In severe cases, prisoners were interrogated in the "bunker" until they confessed. At the end, came the verdict and the punishment, for example "tree", or "twenty-five" (see photo, above).

The camp commandant had to sign off on the sentence worked out by the interrogation officer. In cases such as corporal punishment, the Inspector in Oranienburg had to approve the punishment. An SS camp doctor had to assess the health of the prisoner, but medical objections were rare. The prisoner had to go to before the infirmary and undress. The SS doctor walked through the rows of prisoners and the infirmary clerk recorded the opinion, "fit".

A few days later, the sentence was carried out. The particular prisoners had to report for punishment and a functionary prisoner had to carry out the punishment. An SS guard unit attended the procedure.

The rules stipulated that the following people were involved in carrying out punishment:

- the SS man or prisoner functionary who had filed the punishment report,
- the interrogation officer,
- the commandant,
- an SS doctor,
- an infirmary clerk,
- a unit of SS guards,
- prisoner functionaries, who had to carry out the sentence,
- the Inspector of the CCI,
- in some cases, Himmler himself.

=== Nazi propaganda ===
Himmler cited the protracted procedure as alleged proof that SS concentration camps were absolutely run as orderly prisons that safeguarded against abuse.

Cruelty, sadistic things, as are often stated in the foreign press, are impossible there. First, only the Inspector of the entire [SS] camp [system] can impose punishment, not even the camp commandant; second, the punishment is carried out by a company of guards so that there is always a platoon, 20–24 people are there; finally there is a doctor at the punishment, and a secretary. And so, you can not have more rigor. — Speech by Himmler to Wehrmacht officers, 1937.

=== Breach of their own rules ===
The cumbersome, bureaucratic procedure obscured the trail of accountability. The complexity of the penal procedure did not lead to a reduction of violations. The "Penalty Catalog" was unconstrained. Prisoners were often beaten without any violations procedure or they were killed by the punishment itself. Compliance with the penal procedure was not a given. For example, Lagerführer Egon Zill once ordered two men to implement the number of blows in a particular punishment. Although this doubled the number of blows given to the prisoner, the total was counted just once.

== See also ==
- Extermination through labor
- Glossary of Nazi Germany
- List of Nazi Party leaders and officials
- List of SS personnel
- Kapo (concentration camp)
- Nazi concentration camp badges about the hierarchy and stigma of groups of prisoners, vis-à-vis guards
