= Disciplinary and Penal Code =

The Disciplinary and Penal Code (German: Lagerordnung), also known as the Punishment Catalogue (Strafkatalog), was a set of regulations governing prisoners in Nazi concentration camps. The code was first written for the Dachau concentration camp and became the uniform code at all Schutzstaffel (SS) concentration camps in Nazi Germany on January 1, 1934. Guards were instructed to report violations of the code to the camp commandant’s office. The Concentration Camps Inspectorate was responsible for carrying out the resulting punishment, which was imposed without verification of the allegations or any possibility of appeal.

== Evolution of a new penal system ==
=== Background ===
The Nazi concentration camps evolved over time following the establishment in 1933. Early camps such as Kemna did not have a unified or coordinated set of regulations, but rather drew their own Lagerordnung from regulations then in use at various police departments and ordinary prisons run by the justice system. (Note: Concentration camps Neustadt an der Weinstraße, Moringen, Kislau, Kuhberg, Hainichen, Hammerstein, Fuhlsbüttel had such regulations. The draft of regulations for Moorland concentration camp and the edict from the Landeskriminalamts ("State Criminal Office") in Dresden for Sachsenburg concentration camp are also examples. Source: Zámečník, Das war Dachau, p.35) Differences were minor: some banned smoking, others allowed prisoners to receive food parcels or visits from family members. These regulations were still based on existing law and operation of the camps was patterned after ordinary prisons. The early camps had penalties such as denial of privileges, or for more severe cases, a hard bed, denial of food, or solitary confinement (sometimes in a darkened cell), but there was no corporal punishment. (Note: The only exception to this was the draft, not yet instituted, from Lutze, Oberpräsident of Hannover. This draft contained clauses where beating with a stick was allowed, "up to 10 blows on the buttocks". This document is dated January 1934, just after Eicke's Lagerordnung. Source: Zámečník, Das war Dachau, pp. 35-36) The early camps were often temporary in nature, and were primarily operated by either the Sturmabteilung or the Gestapo.

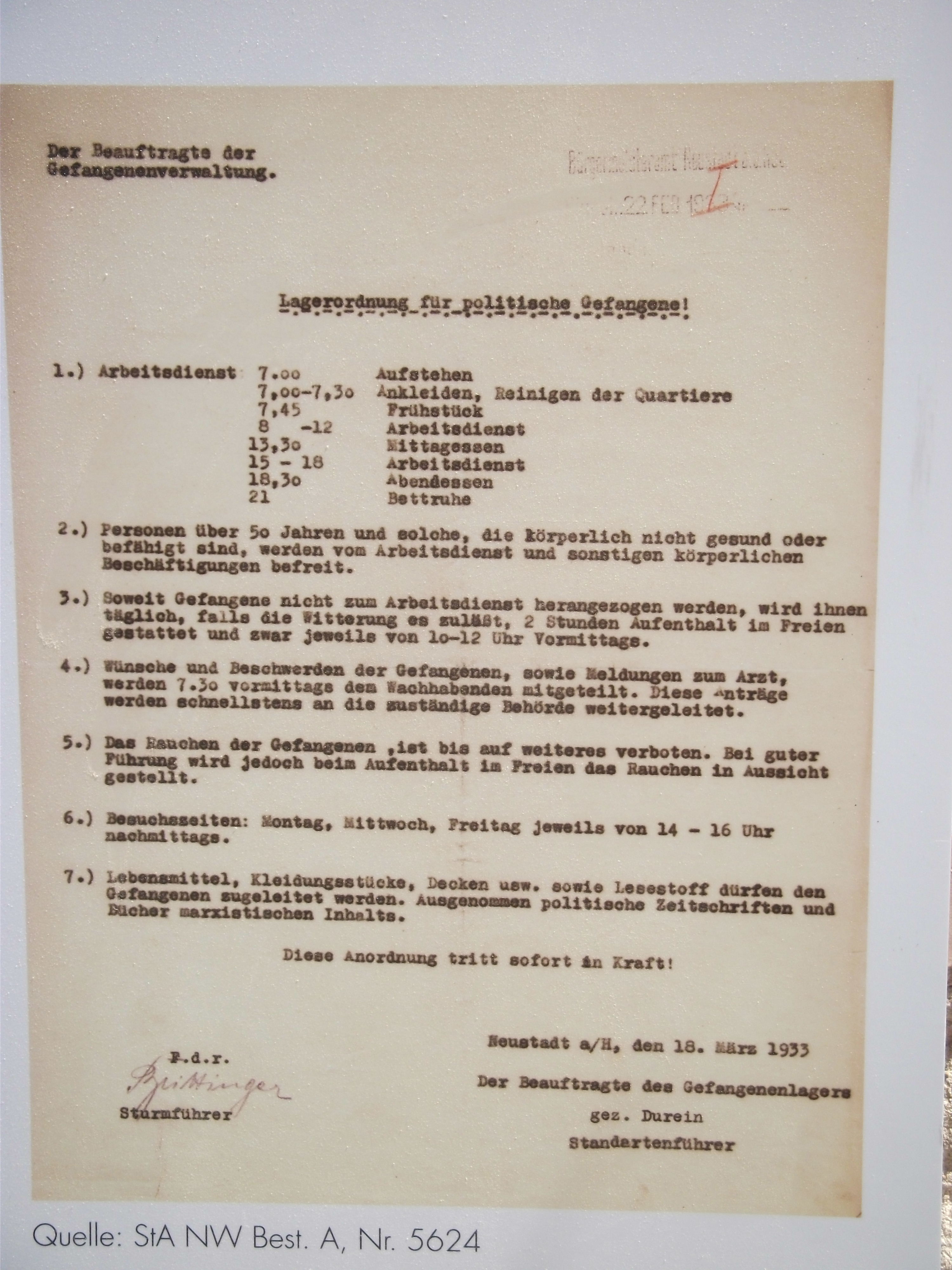
Lagerordnung for Neustadt an der Weinstraße camp, 1933.

=== Dachau ===
Dachau concentration camp, in contrast, was under the control of the Schutzstaffel (SS) and its commandant Hilmar Wäckerle wrote the first Lagerordnung for a concentration camp in May 1933. It gave full jurisdiction at the camp to the office of commandant, making him the sole legal authority. The executive, judicial and legislative were unified, with the separation of powers and system of opposing checks and balances abolished. To impose capital punishment at Dachau, it would be sufficient to have a judgment from two SS men — appointed by the commandant — and a defense of the accused would no longer be recorded. The ever-present threat of the death penalty would create a constant state of emergency for the inmates. Dachau would become a prototype from which the other Nazi concentration camps would be modelled.

The earliest legalized political murders in Nazi Germany took place at Dachau, and in none of the other early concentration camps were there as many political murders as in Dachau's first few months. These murders led to an investigation when Sophie Handschuh, the mother of one of the dead prisoners, filed a formal complaint to find out what had really happened to her son. Wäckerle was forced to resign from his position due to the resulting prosecution. SS chief Heinrich Himmler installed Theodor Eicke, a fanatical SS-Oberführer, as the new commandant of Dachau. Eicke's extreme violence had, only shortly before in March 1933, caused him to be committed for evaluation at a psychiatric clinic at the University of Würzburg. Himmler arranged for Eicke to be released by asking his doctor, Werner Heyde, to talk to Eicke and get him to promise to control himself.

== Expanded to all camps ==
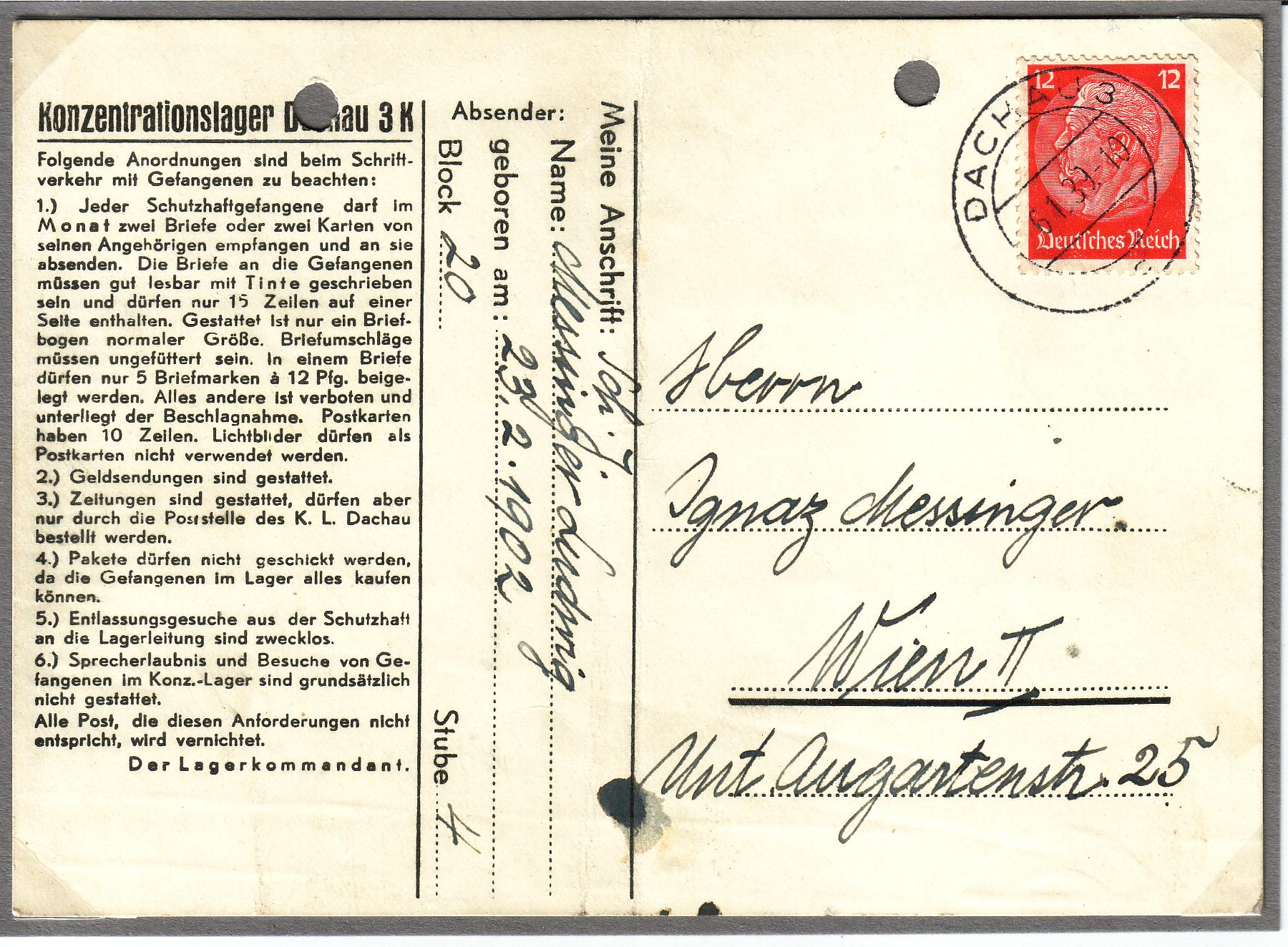
Postcard from a prisoner at Dachau, with detailed rules for correspondence

On 1 October 1933, six months later, Eicke wrote a second edition of the Lagerordnung, adding the Postenpflicht and introducing corporal punishment (flogging). The Lagerordnung established a "state within a state". The second edition established an orderly system, whereby "legally" arrested political opponents could be subjected to torture and execution by the SS.

From 1 January 1934, all subsequent versions of the Lagerordnung were effective for all SS-run concentration camps.

== The Disciplinary and Penal Code ==
[Translator's note: The sometimes odd phrasing, inconsistencies of capitalization, and style itself are from the source, not the translator.] (Note: The original article on the German Wikipedia also has a comment (in the editable view) about the spelling mistakes, style and phrasing.)

Dachau Concentration Camp
Office of the Commandant, October 1, 1933

Disciplinary and Penal Code for the Detention Camp

Introduction

The following penalties are issued within the scope of existing camp regulations, to maintain order and discipline on the grounds of Dachau concentration camp, These regulations apply to all prisoners of the DCC from the time of admission on, till the hour of discharge.
The consummate authority of punishment is in the hands of the camp commandant, who is personally responsible to the political police commander for the implementation of the rules as issued.
Tolerance means weakness. Realizing this, there will be a ruthless grip there, where, in the interests of the fatherland, it appears necessary. The decent, incited [sic] Volksgenosse (Note: Volksgenosse is a Nazi word meaning "fellow German" or "fellow comrade".) will not come into contact with these penalties. But to the politicizing rabble-rouser and intellectual agitator — regardless of which direction — let it be said, beware, that you're not nabbed, otherwise you'll be grabbed by the neck and after your own recipe , [sic] made to hold your peace.

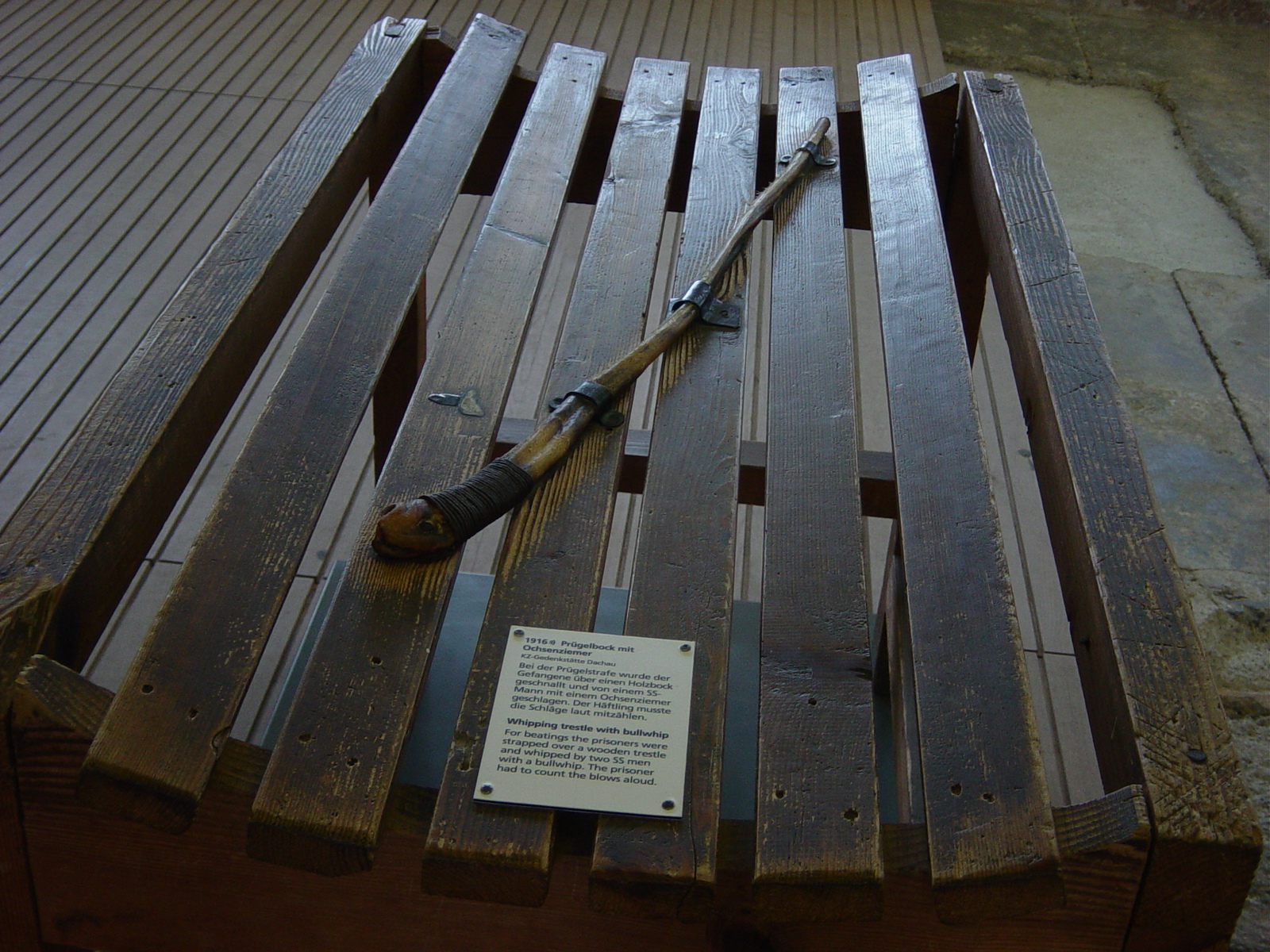
Punishment horse for flogging, Dachau concentration camp

§1 (Note: Because there is no complete document from Dachau, §§1 through 5 and 14 through 18 are taken from the Lichtenburg Lagerordnung. The differences are primarily of minor terminology, such as names for holidays or prisoner functionary jobs. Source: Stanislav Zámečník, Das war Dachau p. 406.)

To be punished with three days of hard time:

1. Whoever after the wake-up call does not immediately quit the dormitory or leave the bed or the barracks room in order.

§2

To be punished with five days of hard time:

1. Whoever knowingly lies under questioning and interrogation.

2. Whoever wears civilian clothing in the camp without a permit.

§3

To be punished with five days of hard time and several weeks of punitive labor:

1. Whoever, without cause or approval of his ward leader, is absent from a roll call or call to work division.

2. Whoever goes to the doctor for no reason or after reporting sick, fails to visit the doctor promptly, moreover, whoever goes to the doctor or dentist or infirmary without the knowledge of the ward leader.

§4

To be punished with 8 days of hard time:

1. Whoever collects signatures for the purpose of grievance.

2. Whoever alleges or files a false report, an essentially false report or an unfounded complaint.

3. Whoever writes more than 2 letters or 2 postcards a month or for this purpose, writes under a false name.

4. Whoever as stubenältester allows a prisoner from another station or room to stay within a workforce.

5. Whoever, unauthorized, is in another hall, even within his own station, is there illegally.

6. Whoever does not keep himself in line with the general camp order, hoots, screams or behaves improperly.

7. As stubenältester, whoever lets vermin (bedbugs, lice, crabs, etc.) be discovered in his area: whether this condition is caused deliberately or transferred to other camp halls, then sabotage comes into question.

8. Whoever is arrested with an infectious or contagious disease and makes no announcement of it on arrival.

9. Whoever deliberately damages articles of clothing and gear, doesn't keep them clean and in order; otherwise will be called on for compensation.

10. Whoever, assigned to food distribution, gives preferential treatment to fellow prisoners or discriminates against prisoners, politically otherwise disposed.

§5

To be punished with 8 days of hard time and with several weeks of punitive labor:

1. Whoever shirks his work or feigns physical deficiency or disease with the aim of being idle.

2. Whoever leaves a work place or workshop without command, prematurely leaves off working, fails [at quitting time] to check out with the supervising SS man, checks out at quitting time with a fellow prisoner.

§6

To be punished with 8 days of hard time and be flogged 25 times with a stick at the beginning and end of the punishment:

1. whoever makes derogatory or sarcastic remarks to an SS member, deliberately neglects the mandatory salute, or by his manner otherwise indicates that he will not submit to the compulsory discipline and order,

2. whoever as prisoner-sergeant, as prisoner-corporal or as foreman exceeds the powers as "Ordnungsmann", (Note: Ordnungsmann translates as "order man" or "man in charge of order".) assumes the rights of a superior with respect to other prisoners, maneuvers preferred work or any other advantage for politically like-minded prisoners, bullies politically otherwise-minded fellow prisoners, makes false reports about them or in some way discriminates.

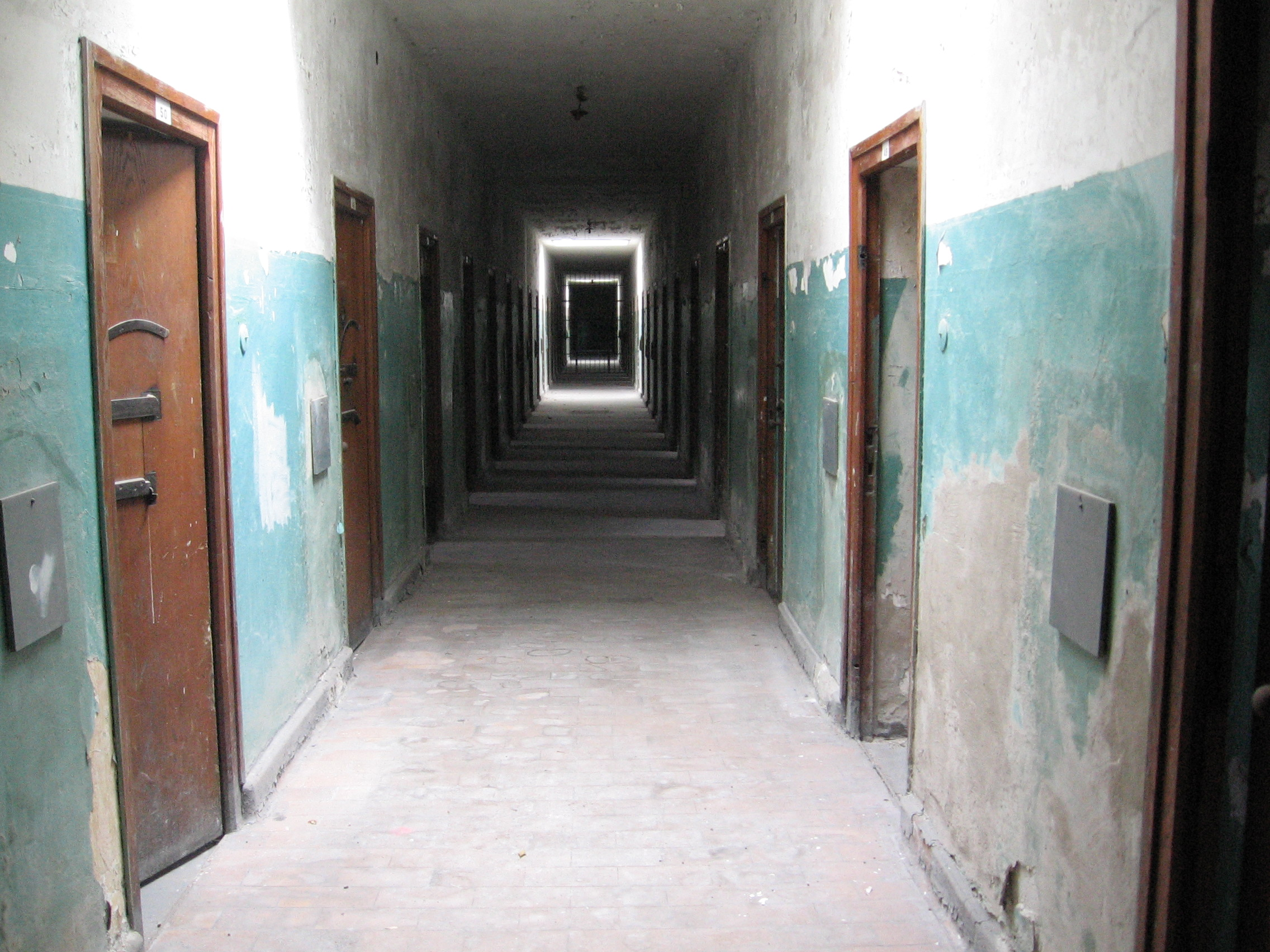
The "Bunker" at Dachau, the camp "prison"

§7

Will be punished with 14 days of severe time

1. Whoever exchanges his assigned housing with another, unauthorized without the order of the commander of the company, or incites or misleads fellow prisoners to do so,

2. whoever attaches forbidden or camp-made items in outgoing laundry packages, hides or sews in clothing items etc.,

3. whoever enters or leaves barracks, housing, or other buildings outside the stipulated entry ways, crawls through windows or existing openings,

4. whoever smokes in the barracks, toilets and in flammable atmospheres, or stores or sets flammable items down in such areas. If a fire occurs as a result of disregarding this ban, then sabotage will be assumed.

§8

Will be punished (Note: The original German had a grammatical mistake, using the wrong case, "werden bestraft" instead of "wird bestraft". Since werden and wird both translate as "will (be)", the sense of the original could only be replicated by introducing another mistake.) with 14 days of severe time and be flogged 25 times with a stick at the beginning and end of the punishment:

1. Whoever leaves or enters the prison camp without escort, whoever follows a work column marching out of the camp, unauthorized,

2. whoever in letters or other communication makes derogatory remarks about National Socialist leaders, the state and government, authorities and establishments, exalts Marxist or liberal leaders or "November parties", (Note: "November parties" referred to left-wing political parties that had fomented the German Revolution of 1918–1919, which began in November. See Theodor Heuss and Ernst Wolfgang Becker, Theodor Heuss – In der Defensive, Briefe 1933-1945, p. 136. Edited by Elke Seefried. K. G. Saur Verlag, Munich. Retrieved May 25, 2010 (in German)) communicates goings-on in the concentration camp,

3. whoever keeps prohibited items, tools, batons and knives in his room or in straw sacks (Note: Prisoner bedding consisted of sacks filled with straw.)

§9

Will be punished with 21 days of severe time

Whoever carts off government-owned items, of whatever sort, from said location to another, deliberately damages, destroys, squanders, alters or uses for any other than purpose than prescribed; apart from the penalty, according to circumstances, is liable to some or all of the prisoners for any losses incurred.

§10

Will be punished with 42 days of severe time or lengthy detention in solitary confinement:

1. Whoever accumulates sums of money in the camp, finances prohibited efforts in or outside of the camp, or brings fellow prisoners to heel or binds them to secrecy through money,

2. whoever has sent to himself sums of money which come from prohibited Rote Hilfe collections, or distributes to fellow prisoners,

3. clergy who make announcements that lie outside the framework of pastoral care, slip letters or messages to be passed on, [whoever] seeks the clergy to achieve forbidden objectives,

4. the symbols of the National Socialist state or the pillars of same, makes contemptible, curses, or in other ways disregards,

§11

Whoever in the camp, at work, in the barracks, in kitchens and workshops, lavatories and rest areas, for the purpose of agitating, politicizes, gives provocative speeches, meets with others for this purpose, forms cliques, or gads about, gathers true or untrue news to further the goals of the opposition's atrocity-propaganda [sic] about the concentration camp or its institutions, receives, buries, passes along to foreign visitors or others, smuggles outside the camp using a secret message or other means, in writing or verbally gives released or transferred [prisoners], hides in articles of clothing or other items, using rocks, etc. throws over the camp wall, or draws up ciphers; moreover, whoever for the purpose of inciting, climbs up on barracks roofs or trees, gives or seeks connection outside [the camp] through light signals or other means, or whoever induces others to escape or commit a crime, and to this end, gives advice or supports through other means, by dint of revolutionary justice, will be hanged as an agitator!

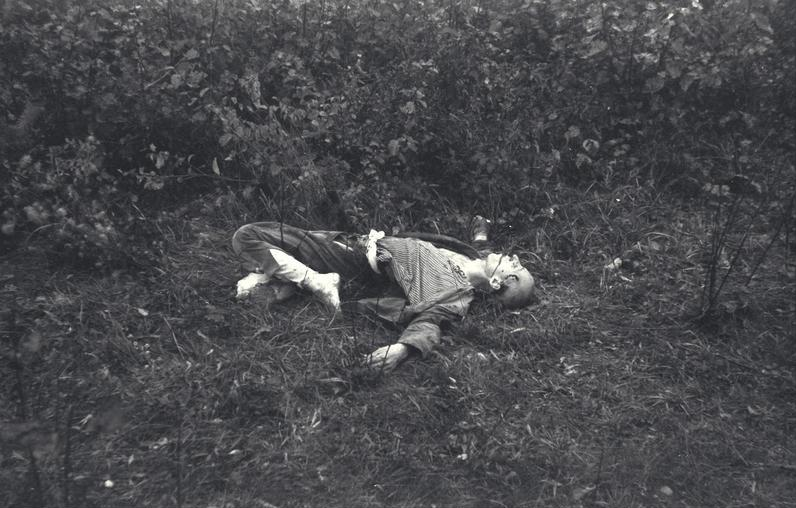
Prisoner shot at Mauthausen-Gusen concentration camp

§12

Whoever assaults a guard or SS man, refuses to obey him or refuses to work at a work site, calls on or leads others for the purpose of mutiny or the same assault, as mutineer leaves a marching column or workshop, calls on others during a march or at work to hoot, shout, agitate or gives speeches, will be shot on the spot as a mutineer or hanged afterwards.

§13

Whoever deliberately causes in the camp, in the barracks, workshops, work sites, in kitchens, warehouses etc. a fire, an explosion, water or some other damage to property, moreover whoever carries out actions on the wire hindrance, on a power line in a switching station, on telephone or water lines, on the camp wall or other security installation, on heating or boiler plants, on machines or vehicles, which do not meet the order given, will be punished with death for sabotage. If the action happened because of negligence, then the guilty party will be held in solitary confinement. In cases of doubt, sabotage will nevertheless be assumed.

§14

Whoever offers gifts to an SS man or guard, seeks to win him over with gifts, money or other means, carries out actions for the purpose of subverting the SS troops, enters into a political discussion in the presence of a guard or SS man, about Marxism or other November Party (Note: See previous footnote about "November parties".) or glorifies their leaders, makes derogatory remarks about the SS, SA, the National Socialist state, its leader and its institutions, or appears otherwise insubordinate, moreover whoever at the camp produces or passes along to others forbidden items for the purpose of smuggling secret messages or for purposes of attack, will be held for community perilousness in perpetual solitary confinement. Release for such persons is out of the question.

§15

Whoever repeatedly avoids work, despite previous warning stays away from roll calls for work assignments or head counts, constantly reports to the doctor or dentist without reason, feigns physical suffering or disability doesn't march [out to work], constantly acts lazy and sluggish, was unclean, writes obnoxious letters, steals from fellow prisoners, hits, bullies [others] for their attitude, derides or ridicules, will be punished for incorrigibility with continuous punitive labor, detention, with punitive exercise or be flogged.

§16

Whoever after the onset of curfew moves outside his quarters, forms a crowd with others, on the order of an SS man does not disperse at once, after the onset of the alarm does not immediately seek out his own quarters or during an extended alarm leave the station or the windows open [sic], will be shot at by the nearest SS man or guard.

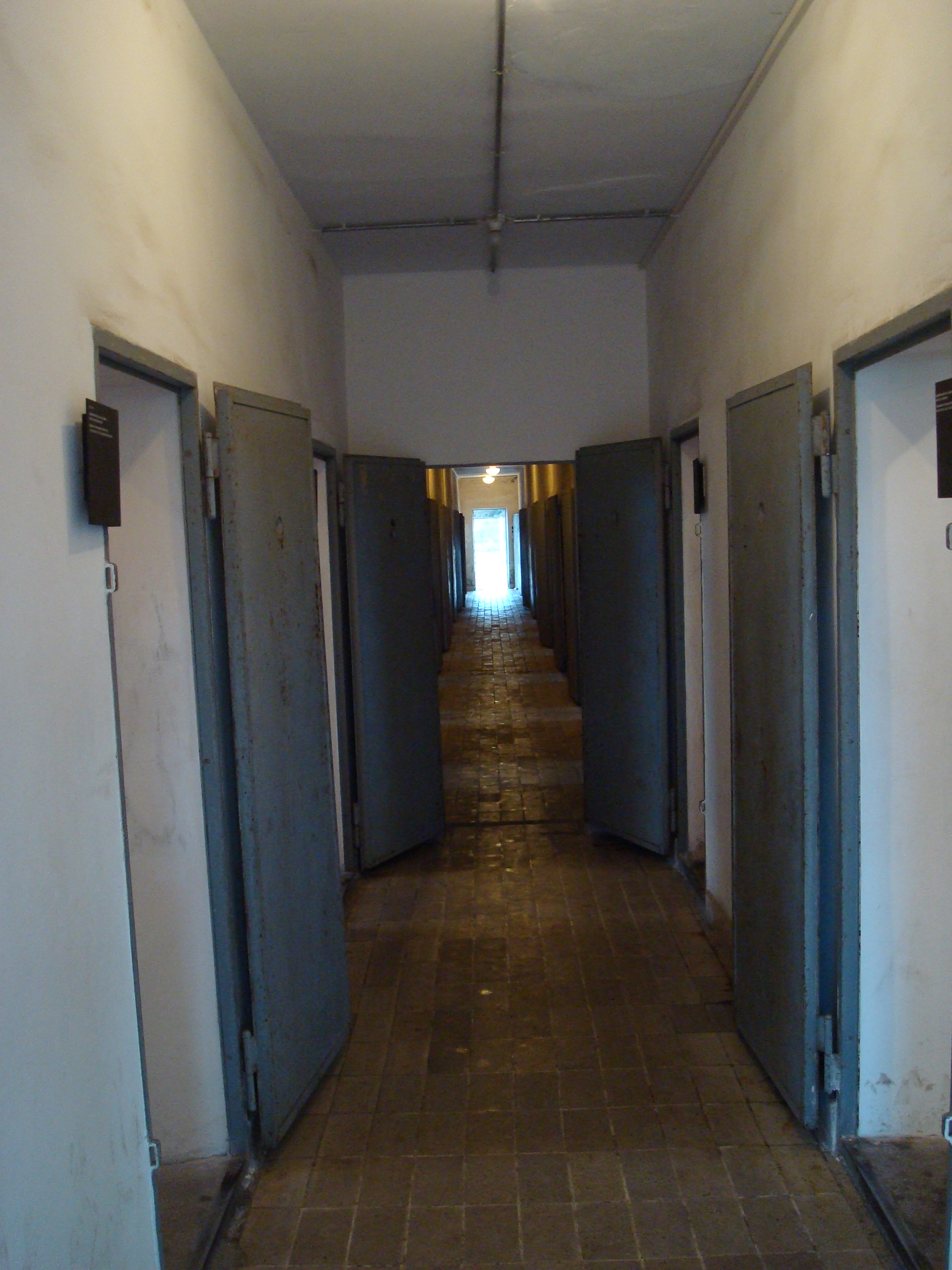
Detention area at Sachsenhausen

§17

Whoever keeps forbidden items (tools, knife, files, etc.) or wears civilian clothing unauthorized, can be held in solitary confinement for suspicion of escape.

§18

Whoever as stubenältester, as foreman or as prisoner suspects or becomes aware of the intent to commit sedition, mutiny, sabotage or some other punishable act, if he does not immediately report his knowledge, will be punished as a perpetrator. The informer will not be held responsible for filing a false report, if, through special circumstances, he was misled.

§19

Hard time will be carried out in a cell with a hard bed and bread and water. Every 4th day, the inmate will receive a warm meal. (Note: This was later made even more severe. See standing cell.) Punitive labor involves hard physical or particularly dirty work, which will be carried out under special supervision.
Supplementary punishments that may be considered:
punishment exercise, corporal punishment, withholding of mail, withholding of food, hard bed, strappado, reprimand and warnings. All punishments will be kept on file. Hard time and punitive labor lengthen the protective custody a minimum of 8 weeks; addition of a supplementary punishment lengthens the protective custody a minimum of 4 weeks. Prisoners kept in solitary confinement will not be released in the foreseeable future.

The Kommandant of the Concentration Camp

(signed) SS-Oberführer Eicke

== See also ==
- Procedures for punishing violations
- Kazimierz Piechowski
