= SS-Totenkopfverbände =

Branch of the SS that managed the Nazi camps (1936–1945)

SS Death's Head Units or Battalions
- SS-Totenkopfverbände (SS-TV)
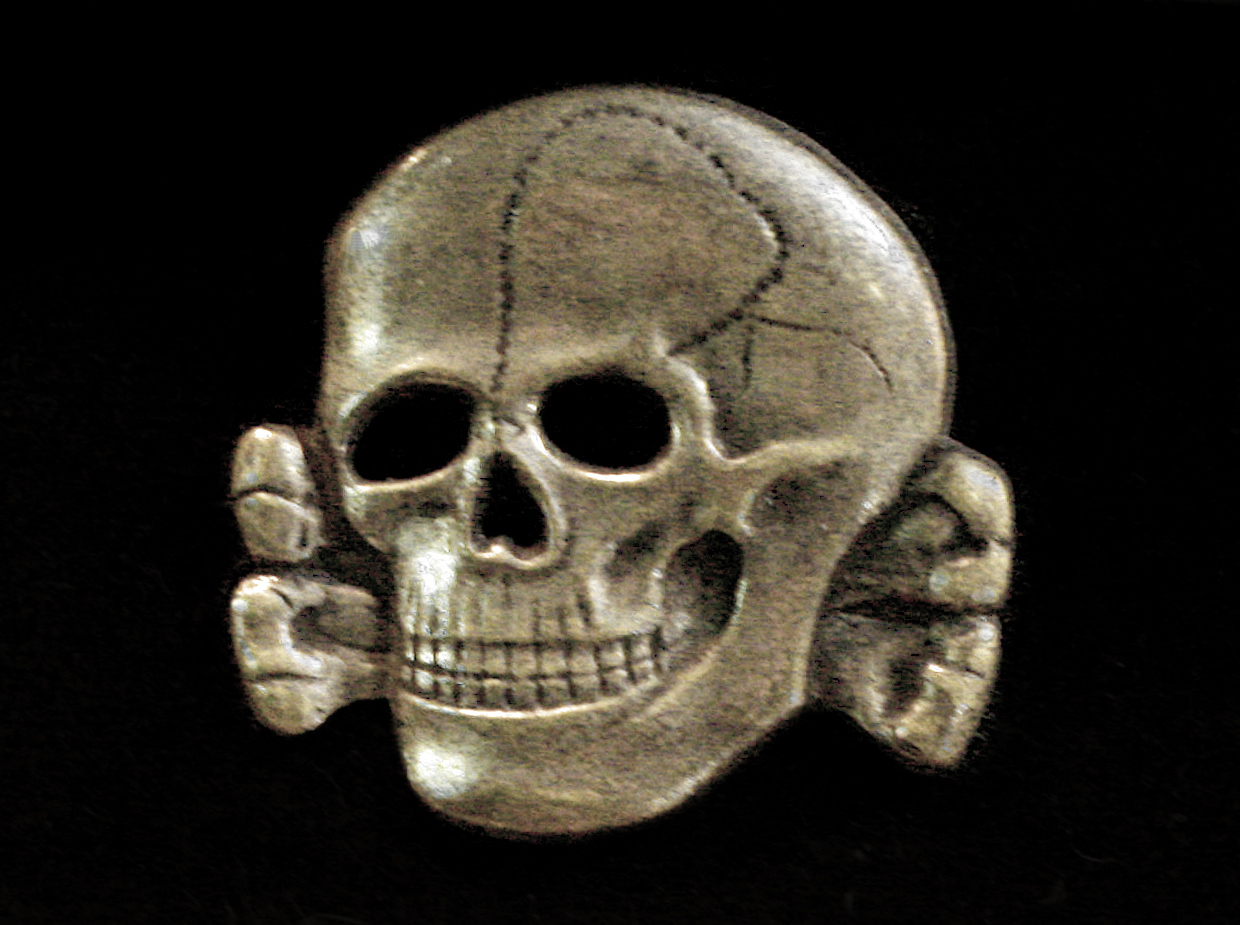
- Right collar insignia (second version, 1934–1945)

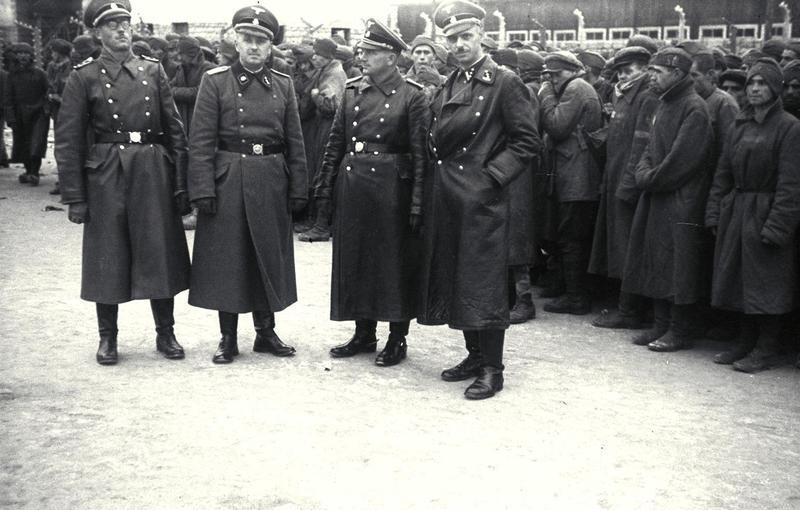
- SS-TV officers at Gusen concentration camp (October 1941)

Agency overview
- Formed: 1936; 90 years ago
- Dissolved: 8 May 1945; 81 years ago
- Type: Paramilitary organisation
- Jurisdiction: Nazi Germany; Occupied Europe
- Headquarters: Oranienburg, near Berlin; 52°45′16″N 13°14′13″E
- Employees: 22,033 (SS-TV 1939 and SS Division Totenkopf c. 1942)
- Minister responsible: Heinrich Himmler (1934–1945), Reichsführer-SS
- Agency executives: Theodor Eicke (1934–1940), Commander; Richard Glücks (1940–1945), Commander
- Parent agency: Schutzstaffel

SS-Totenkopfverbände (Note: German pronunciation: [ɛsɛsˈtoːtənkɔp͡ffɜbɛndə]) (SS-TV; lit. 'SS Death's Head Units' or 'SS Death's Head Battalions') was a major branch of the Nazi Party's paramilitary Schutzstaffel (SS) organisation. It was responsible for administering the concentration camps and extermination camps of Nazi Germany, among similar duties. It was both the successor and expanded organisation to the SS-Wachverbände (guard units) formed in 1933. While the Totenkopf was the universal cap badge of the SS, the SS-TV also wore this insignia on the right collar tab to distinguish itself from other SS formations.

On 29 March 1936, concentration camp guards and administration units were officially designated as the SS-Totenkopfverbände (SS-TV). The SS-TV was an independent unit within the SS, with its own command structure. It ran the camps throughout Germany and later in occupied Europe. Camps in Germany included Dachau, Bergen-Belsen, and Buchenwald; camps elsewhere in Europe included Auschwitz-Birkenau in German occupied Poland and Mauthausen in Austria among the numerous other concentration camps, and death camps handled with the utmost of secrecy. The extermination camps' function was genocide; they included Treblinka, Bełżec, and Sobibór built specifically for Aktion Reinhard, as well as the original Chełmno extermination camp, and Majdanek which was fitted with mass killing facilities, along with Auschwitz. They were responsible for facilitating what the Nazis called the Final Solution, known since the war as the Holocaust; perpetrated by the SS within the command structure of the Reich Security Main Office, subordinate to Heinrich Himmler, and the SS Economic and Administrative Main Office or WVHA.

At the outbreak of World War II in Europe, the SS Division Totenkopf was formed from SS-TV personnel. It soon developed a reputation for brutality, participating in war crimes such as the Le Paradis massacre in 1940 during the Fall of France. On the Eastern Front, the mass shootings of Polish and Soviet civilians in Operation Barbarossa were the work of Einsatzgruppen mobile death squads and their subgroups called Einsatzkommando. These units were organized by Himmler and Reinhard Heydrich.

== Formation ==
After taking national power in 1933, the Nazi Party launched a new programme of mass incarceration of the so-called enemies of the state. Originally there were only wild camps in operation. Springing up in every town across Germany "like mushrooms after the rain" (Himmler's quote), the early camps utilized lockable spaces usually without infrastructure for permanent detention (i.e. engine rooms, brewery floors, storage facilities, cellars). Following the fall from power of the paramilitary Brownshirts of the SA during the NSDAP purge known as the Night of the Long Knives (30 June to 2 July 1934), the SS took control of the fledgling camp system. The SS founded state-run concentration camps at Dachau, Oranienburg, and Esterwegen, which held the total of 107,000 'undesirables' already by 1935.

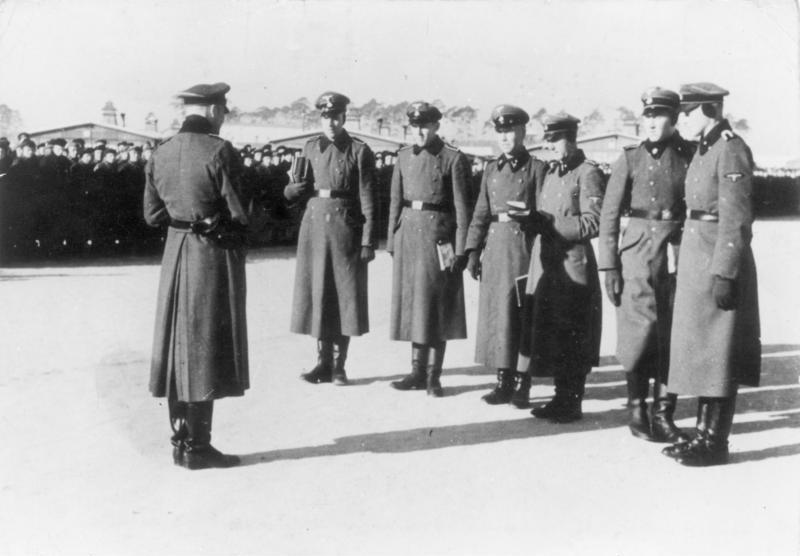
SS-TV officers at Sachsenhausen concentration camp, 1936

On 26 June 1933, Reichsführer-SS Heinrich Himmler appointed SS-Oberführer Theodor Eicke the Kommandant of the Dachau concentration camp. Eicke requested a permanent unit that would be subordinate only to him, and hence the SS-Wachverbände (guard units) were formed. Eicke began his infamous tenure by issuing new orders about the killing of inmates trying to escape (Postenpflicht). He developed the first Lagerordnung, a Nazi disciplinary and penal code regulating the system of extreme disciplinary sanctions for detainees. His rules were adopted by all concentration camps of Nazi Germany as of 1 January 1934. Eicke was promoted to SS-Brigadeführer (equivalent to a major-general in the army) on 30 January 1934. Following the Night of the Long Knives, Eicke – who played a role in the affair by shooting SA chief Ernst Röhm – was again promoted to the rank of SS-Gruppenführer and officially appointed Inspector of Concentration Camps and Commander of the SS-Wachverbände. Thereafter, all remaining SA-run camps were taken over by the SS. In his role as the Concentration Camps Inspector, Eicke began a large reorganisation of the camps in 1935. The smaller camps were dismantled. Dachau concentration camp remained, then personnel from Dachau went on to work at Sachsenhausen and Oranienburg, where Eicke established his central office.

In 1935, Dachau became the training center for the concentration camps service. Many of the early recruits came from the ranks of the SA and Allgemeine SS. Senior roles were filled by personnel from the Ordnungspolizei, the police who maintained order. On 29 March 1936, concentration camp guards and administration units were officially designated as the SS-Totenkopfverbände (SS-TV). In the summer of 1937, Buchenwald became operational, followed by Ravensbrück (near Lichtenburg) in May 1939. There were other new camps in Austria, such as Mauthausen-Gusen concentration camp, which opened in 1938. All SS camps' regulations, both for guards and prisoners, followed the Dachau camp model.

== Further development ==
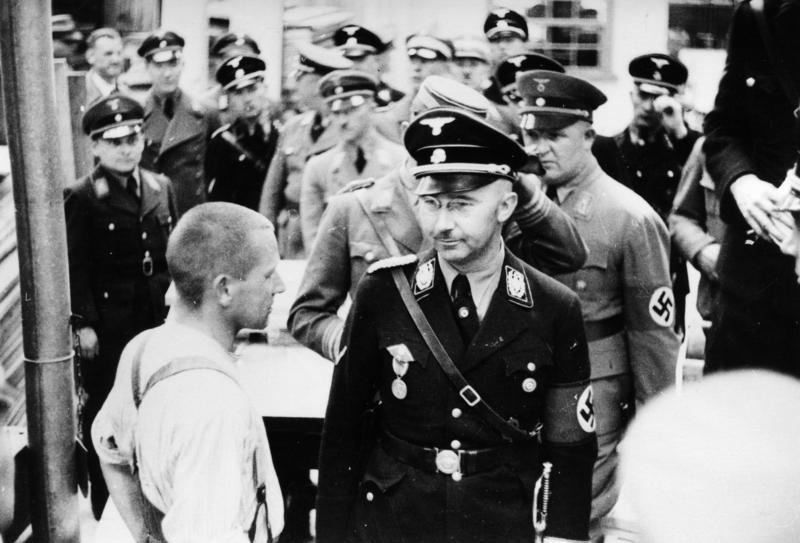
Heinrich Himmler (front right, beside prisoner) inspecting Dachau concentration camp on 8 May 1936

In 1935, as the concentration camp system within Germany expanded, groups of camps were organized into Wachsturmbanne (battalions) under the office of the Inspector of Concentration Camps who answered directly to the SS headquarters office and Heinrich Himmler. When the SS-Totenkopfverbände were formally established in March 1936, the group was organized into six Wachtruppen situated at each of Germany's major concentration camps. In April 1936, Eicke was named commander of the SS-Totenkopfverbände and the number of men under his command increased from 2,876 to 3,222; the Concentration Camps Inspectorate (CCI) was also provided official funding through the Reich's budget office, and Eicke was allowed to recruit future troops from the Hitler Youth based on regional needs. In 1937, the Wachsturmbanne were in turn organized into three main SS-Totenkopfstandarten (regiments).

By 1936, Eicke had begun to establish military formations of concentration camp personnel which eventually became the Totenkopf Division and other units of the Waffen-SS. In the early days of the military camp service formation, the group's exact chain of command was contested since Eicke as Führer der Totenkopfverbände exercised personal control of the group but also, as it was considered an armed SS formation, authority over the armed units was claimed by the SS-Verfügungstruppe (SS-VT), which had been first formed in 1934 as combat troops for the Nazi Party. But at this time, Himmler and Eicke envisioned the armed SS-VT as a force for internal "police and security operations". Later by 1938, it became clear that the SS-VT troops were to be used for front-line "purposes", as well.

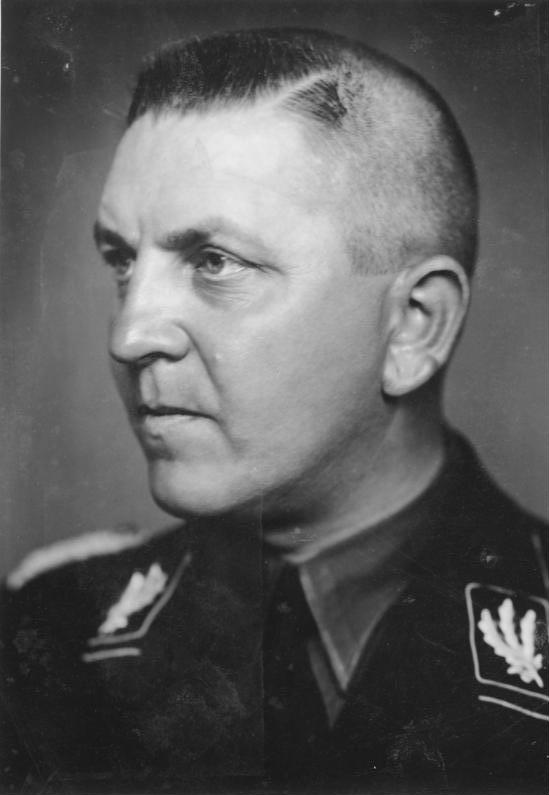
Concentration Camp Inspector Theodor Eicke

Eicke in his role as the commander of the SS-TV, continued to reorganize the camp system by dismantling smaller camps. By August 1937 only Dachau, Sachsenhausen, Buchenwald and Ravensbrück remained in Germany. In 1938 Eicke oversaw the building of new camps in Austria following the Anschluss, such as Mauthausen. Eicke's reorganization and the introduction of forced labor made the camps one of the SS's most powerful tools, but it earned him the enmity of Gestapo and Sicherheitsdienst (SD) chief, Reinhard Heydrich, who wanted to take over control of the concentration camp system. Himmler wanted to keep a separation of power, so Eicke remained in command of the SS-TV and camp operations. This kept control of the camps out of the hands of the Gestapo or the SD.

By April 1938, the SS-TV had four regiments of three storm battalions with three infantry companies, one machine gun company and medical, communication and transportation units. On 17 August 1938 Hitler decreed, at Himmler's request, the SS-TV to be the official reserve for the SS-VT; this would over the course of the war lead to a constant flux of men between the Waffen-SS and the concentration camps. Himmler's intention was simply to expand his private army by using the SS-TV (as well as the police, which he also controlled) as a manpower pool. Himmler sought and obtained a further decree, issued on 18 May 1939, which authorized the expansion of the SS-TV to 50,000 men, and directed the army to provide it with military equipment, something the army had resisted.

== Invasion of Poland ==
"the object of war is . . . physically to destroy the enemy. That is why I have prepared, for the moment only in the East, my 'Death's Head' formations with orders to kill without pity or mercy all men, women, and children of Polish descent or language. Only in this way can we obtain the living space we need."

— Hitler's speech to officers of the Wehrmacht High Command at Obersalzberg, 22 August 1939
Sonderaktion Tannenberg

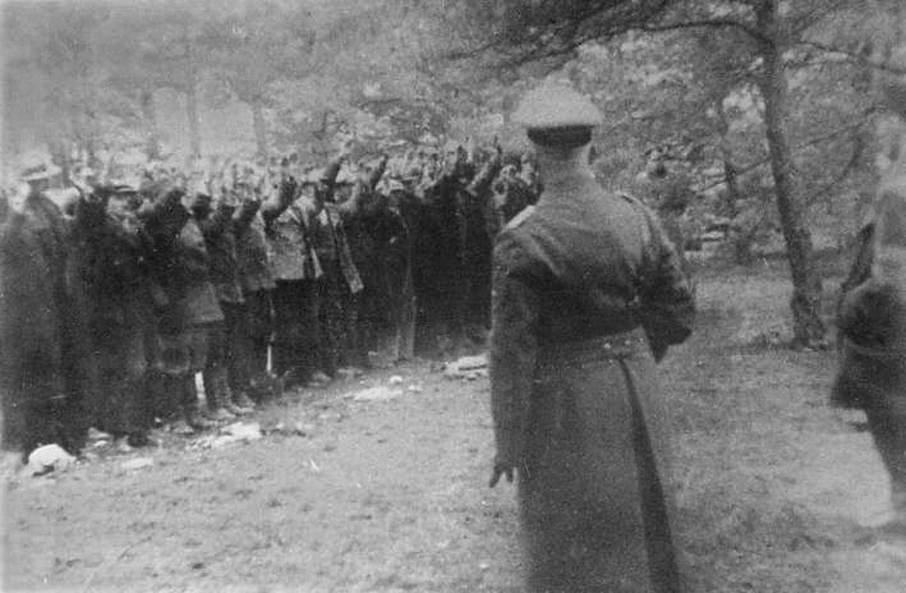
The 1939 massacres of Poles in Piaśnica; victims who were named by the secret Sonderfahndungsbuch Polen assembled at the Darżlubska woods execution site; one of many murder sites in western Poland

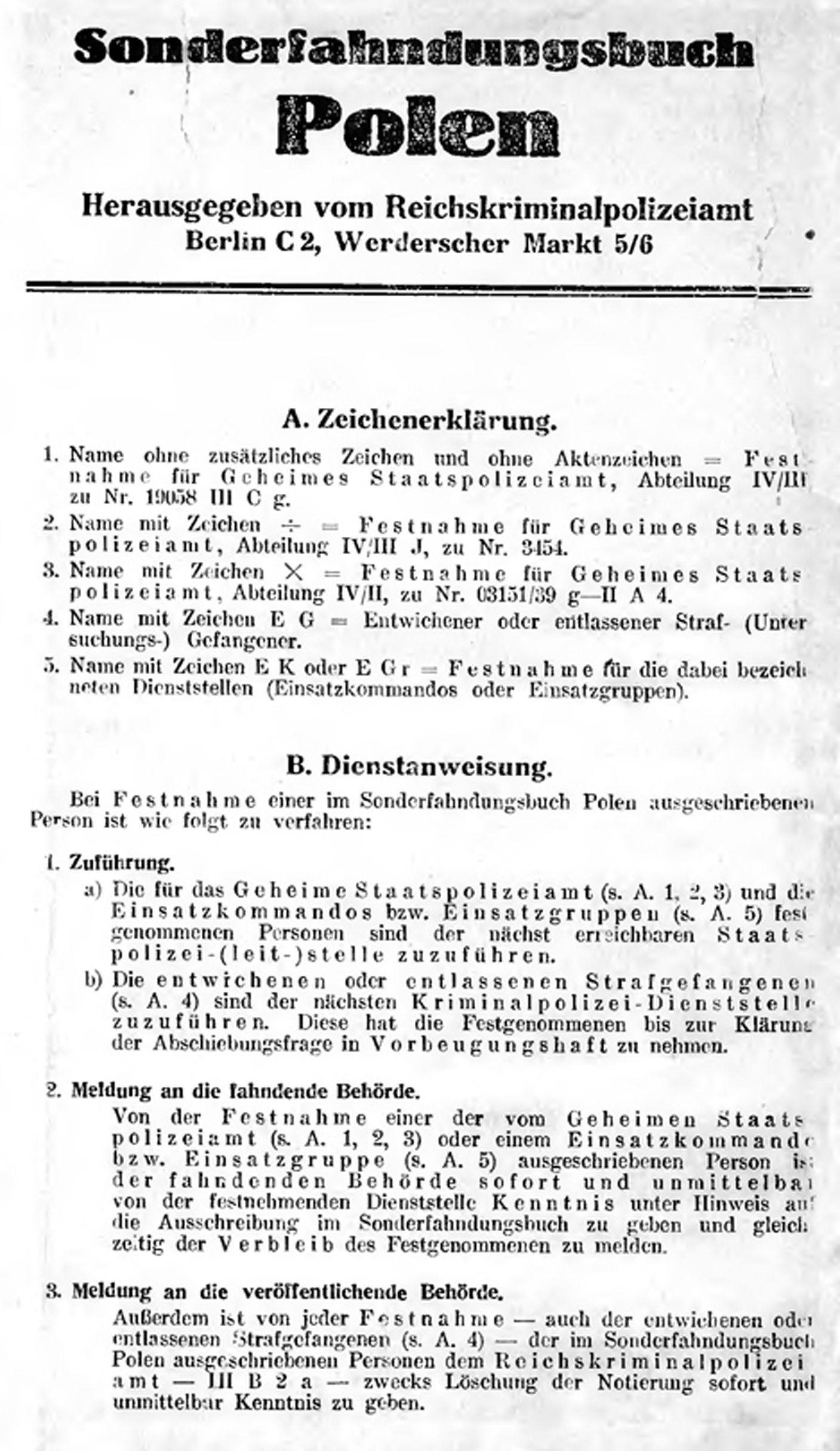
Sonderfahndungsbuch Polen published in Germany before the attack. Page with symbols used in the extermination actions

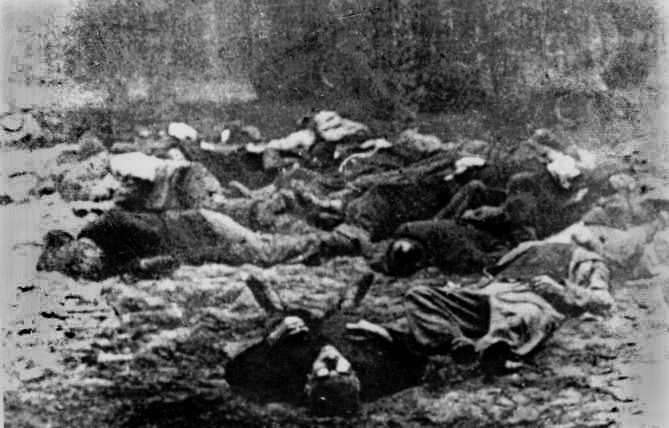
Bodies of the Piaśnica victims of Intelligenzaktion Pommern

During the German invasion of Poland in September 1939, Eicke's SS-TV field forces numbered four infantry regiments and a cavalry regiment, plus two battalions placed in Free City of Danzig. The SS-TV role in the attack on Poland was not military in spite of close proximity to combat. "Their military capabilities were employed instead in terrorizing the civilian population through acts that included hunting down straggling Polish soldiers, confiscating agricultural produce and livestock, and torturing and murdering large numbers of Polish political leaders, aristocrats, businessmen, priests, intellectuals, and Jews." Eicke's three regiments, Oberbayern, Brandenburg and Thuringen, were reformed as the first Einsatzgruppen; the Oberbayern and the Thuringen (EG II and EG z. B.V) followed the Tenth Army in Upper Silesia; the Brandenburg (EG III) followed the Eight Army across Warthegau. The behavior of these Standarten in Poland elicited some protests from officers of the army, including 8th Army commander Johannes Blaskowitz who wrote a memorandum to Walther von Brauchitsch detailing the SS-TV atrocities, unaware that they were planned years in advance by the Central Unit II P-Poland under Heydrich who himself coordinated secret extermination actions including Operation Tannenberg and the Intelligenzaktion both targeting more than 61,000 members of Polish elites during the opening stages of World War II.

At the beginning of war in Europe, the SS forces consisted of roughly 250,000 servicemen spread out across multiple branches, with transferable ranks and service records from police regiments and the army. Himmler's military formations at this time comprised several subgroups, including the SS-Verfügungstruppe, which would become the basis of the Waffen-SS. Hitler approved further expansion of the armed SS formations. By October 1939, a new SS military division the SS-Totenkopf was formed. The Totenkopf was initially formed from concentration camp guards of the Standarten (regiments) of the SS-TV and soldiers from the SS-Heimwehr "Danzig. Members of other SS militias were transferred into the division in early 1940; these units had been involved in multiple massacres of Polish civilians, political leaders and prisoners of war.

From fall 1939 to spring 1940 a massive recruitment effort in Germany raised no fewer than twelve new TK-Standarten (four times the size of the SS-Verfügungstruppe) in anticipation of the coming attack on France. Both Eicke personally and his Totenkopf Division performed poorly during Fall Gelb therefore Himmler resolved to curb his decisions which had spurred a conflict with Hausser and Dietrich; especially his designation of TK-Standarten as reserves for his Totenkopf Division alone, and the fact that the SS-Verfügungstruppe military supplies were stored at Eicke's concentration camps. On 15 August 1940 Himmler dissolved Eicke's Inspectorate of SS-Totenkopfstandarten using as justification several well-publicized atrocities committed by the Division in France, and transferred the Totenkopf Division, the independent TK-Standarten, and their reserve and replacement system to the newly formed Waffen-SS high command. In February 1941 the Totenkopf designation was removed from the names of all units other than the Totenkopf Division and the camp Totenkopfwachsturmbanne, and their personnel exchanged the Death's-Head collar insignia for the Waffen-SS Sig-runes. The camp system expanded greatly after the invasion of the Soviet Union in 1941, when large numbers of Soviet soldiers were captured. Some were transferred to the camps, where their inhumane treatment became normal.

The Totenkopf Division still had close ties to the camp service and its members continued to wear the Death's-Head as their unit insignia. They were known for brutal tactics, a result of the original doctrine of "no pity" which Eicke had instilled in his camp personnel as far back as 1934, together with the fact that the original Totenkopfstandarte had "trained" themselves. The Division's ineffectiveness in France, as well as its war crimes, can in part be explained by its personnel who were more thugs than soldiers. When first formed a total of 6,500 men from the SS-TV were transferred into the Totenkopf Division. Over the course of the savage fighting in the East, the Division was twice effectively destroyed and recreated. Very few of the men who were part of the 1939 Standarten in Poland were still in the Division by 1945.

After the close of the Battle of France, the SS-Verfügungstruppe was officially renamed the Waffen-SS in a speech made by Hitler in July 1940. Himmler also gained approval for the Waffen-SS to form its own high command, the Kommandoamt der Waffen-SS within the SS-Führungshauptamt, which was created in August 1940. It received command of the SS-Verfügungstruppe (the Leibstandarte and the SS-Verfügungs-Division, renamed Reich) and the armed SS-TV regiments (the Totenkopf-Division together with the independent Totenkopf-Standarten). The Waffen-SS was greatly expanded and allowed to recruit volunteers from conquered territories from the ethnic German and Germanic populations.

=== System of concentration camps ===
After Eicke was reassigned to combat duty, his Chief of Staff SS-Gruppenführer Richard Glücks was appointed the new Concentration Camps Inspectorate (CCI) or IKL (Inspektion der Konzentrationslager) chief by Himmler. By 1940, the CCI came under the control of the Verwaltung und Wirtschaftshauptamt Hauptamt (VuWHA; Administration and Business office) which was set up under Oswald Pohl. Then in 1942, the CCI became Amt D (Office D) of the consolidated main office known as the SS-Wirtschafts-Verwaltungshauptamt (SS Economic and Administrative Department; WVHA) under Pohl. Glücks continued to manage the camp administration until the end of the war. Therefore, the entire concentration camp system was placed under the authority of the WVHA with the Inspector of Concentration Camps a subordinate to the Chief of the WVHA.

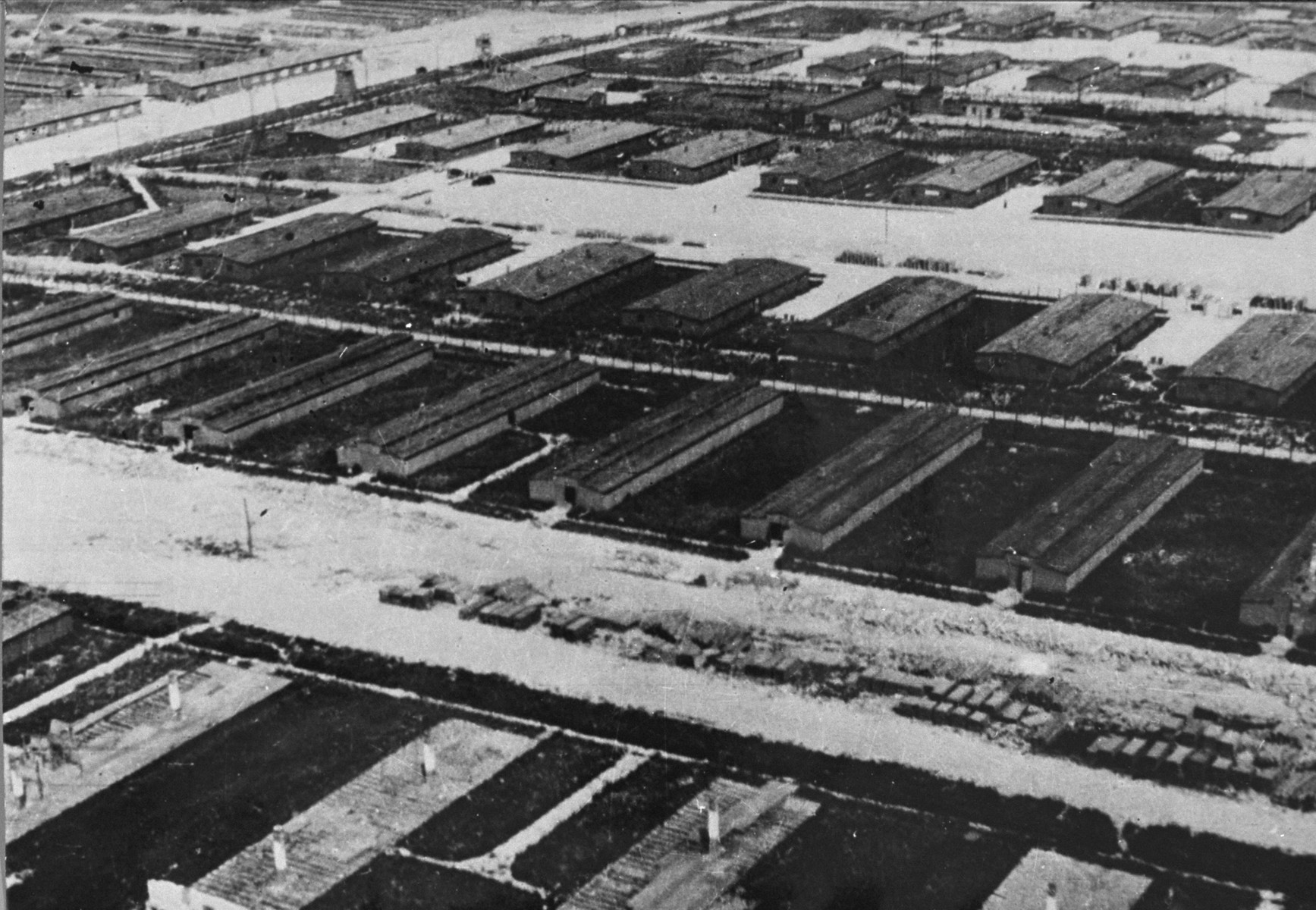
Majdanek concentration camp which was run by the SS-Totenkopfverbände was also the location of defense contractor Deutsche Ausrüstungswerke (DAW); owned and operated by the Schutzstaffel (SS)

By 1941, prior to the "Final Solution", the concentration camps run by SS-TV, both in Germany and across occupied territories, grew into a massive system of institutionalized forced labour for the SS. The concentration camp personnel began to arrive from the front-line SS formations upon medical discharge. Attack dogs were introduced to compensate for the personnel shortage. Special death camps of Aktion Reinhard had also come into existence. Under the WVHA, the camps were separated into divisions of forced labor, concentration, and extermination camps, all linked by record-high profit margins propped up by the theft of cash and assets from the Holocaust victims. Gigantic camps at Auschwitz and Majdanek were built with the expectation of Soviet prisoners of war entering the camp labour after 1941.

During the war, almost half of the concentration camp officers served with the Waffen-SS combat divisions, including the Leibstandarte, Das Reich, Wiking, the Nord Division, and Totenkopf. Some concentration camp officers served as division commanders in the Waffen-SS. By October 1944 the Waffen-SS membership reached 800,000 and up to 910,000 men.

Within the camps themselves, there existed a hierarchy of camp titles and positions which were unique only to the camp service. Each camp was commanded by a Kommandant, sometimes referred to as Lagerkommandant, who was assisted by a camp adjutant and command staff. The prison barracks within the camp were supervised by a Rapportführer who was responsible for daily roll call and the camp daily schedule. The individual prisoner barracks were overseen by junior SS-NCOs called Blockführer who, in turn had one to two squads of SS soldiers responsible for overseeing the prisoners. Within the extermination camps, the Blockführer was in charge of the prisoner Sonderkommando and was also the person who would physically gas victims in the camp's gas chambers.

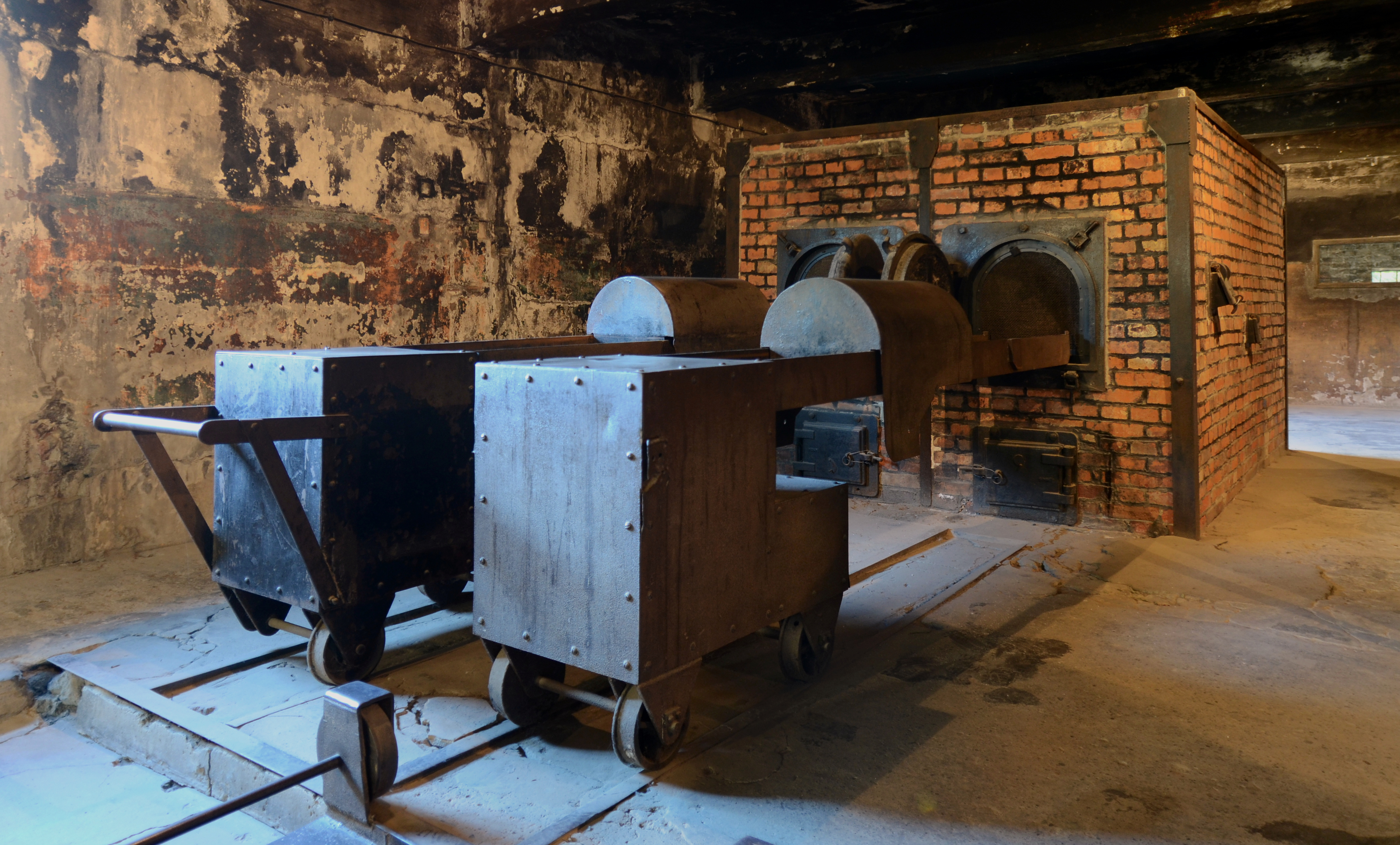
Crematorium at Auschwitz I

The Jewish Sonderkommando workers in turn, were terrorised by up to around 100 mostly collaborator Trawniki men per camp, called Wachmannschaften (security guards or watchmen).

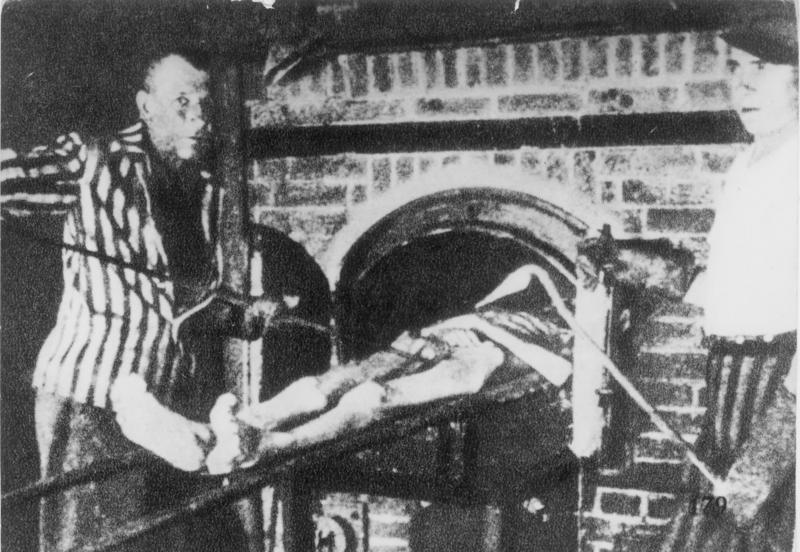
Demonstration photo by former prisoners at the Crematorium in Dachau concentration camp

The camp perimeter and watch towers were overseen by a separate formation called the Wachbattalion (guard battalion). The guard battalion commander was responsible for providing watch bills to man guard towers and oversaw security patrols outside the camp. The battalion was organized on typical military lines with companies, platoons, and squads. The battalion commander was subordinate directly to the camp commander.

Concentration camps also had supply and medical personnel, attached to the headquarters office under the camp commander, as well as a security office with Gestapo and Kripo personnel attached to the camp. Heydrich had been successful in getting control over the "political departments" of the camps. These security personnel were under direct command of Sicherheitspolizei (SiPo) commanders until September 1939 and thereafter, the Reich Security Main Office (Reichssicherheitshauptamt, RSHA) commanders independent of the camps.

In addition to the regular SS personnel assigned to a concentration camp, there also existed a prisoner system of trustees known as Kapos who performed a wide variety of duties from administration to overseeing other groups of prisoners. The Sonderkommandos were special groups of Jewish prisoners who assisted in the extermination camps with the disposal of bodies and other tasks. The duty of actually gassing prisoners was, however, always carried out by the SS.

== The Holocaust ==
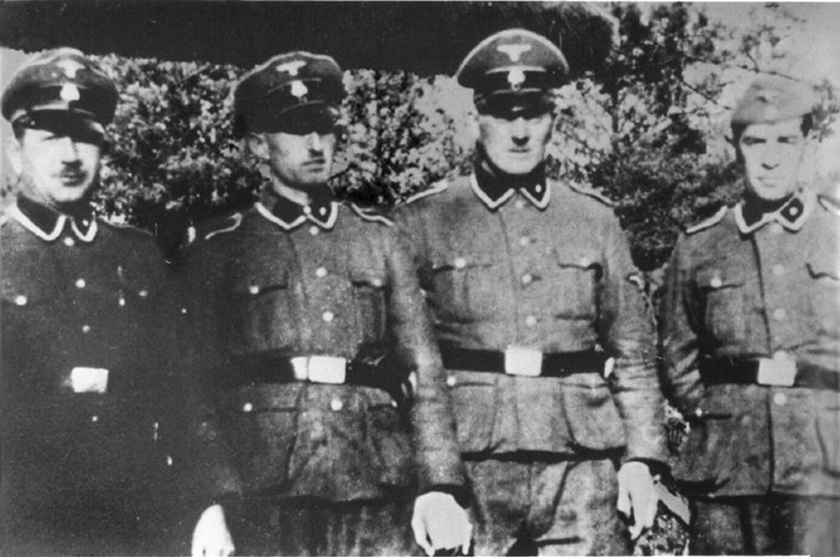
Members of Totenkopfverbände from Treblinka extermination camp (from left): Paul Bredow, Willi Mentz, Max Möller and Josef Hirtreiter

In 1942 Glücks was increasingly involved in the administration of the Endlösung, supplying personnel to assist in Aktion Reinhardt (although the death camps of Belzec, Treblinka and Sobibor were administered by SS-und Polizei-führer Odilo Globocnik of the General Government). In July 1942, Glücks met Himmler to discuss medical experiments on concentration camp inmates. All extermination orders were issued from Glücks' office to SS-TV commands throughout Nazi Germany and occupied Europe. He specifically authorized the purchase of Zyklon B for use at Auschwitz.

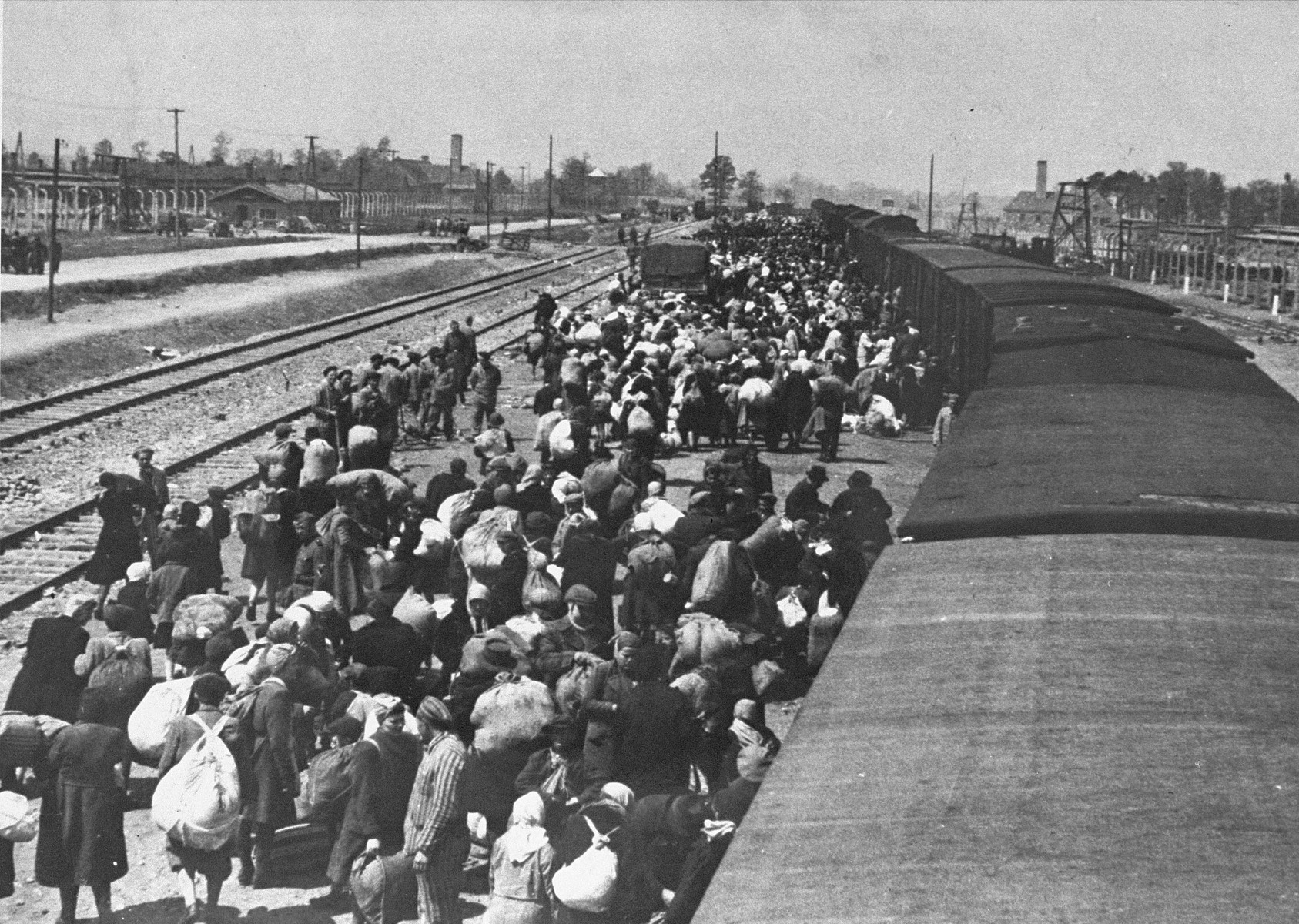
Carpathian Ruthenian Jews arrive at Auschwitz–Birkenau, May 1944. Most were murdered in gas chambers hours after arriving.

Already in 1943 the SS-TV units began to receive orders to conceal as much of the evidence of the Holocaust as possible. Himmler was most concerned about covering up Nazi crimes ever since the Polish 22,000 victims of the Soviet Katyn massacre were discovered well preserved underground near Smolensk. The cremations began shortly thereafter and continued until the camps' official closure. Camps were meticulously destroyed, sick prisoners were shot and others were marched on death marches away from the advancing Allies. The SS-TV were also instrumental in the execution of hundreds of political prisoners to prevent their liberation.

By April 1945 many SS-TV had left their posts. Due to their notoriety, some removed their death head insignia to hide their identities. Camp duties were increasingly turned over to so-called "Auxiliary-SS", soldiers and civilians conscripted as camp guards so that the Totenkopf men could escape. However, many were arrested by the Allies and stood trial for war crimes at Nuremberg between 1946 and 1949. "Immediately after their seizure by the Russians on 9–10 May 1945 – wrote Sydnor – the officers and men in the Totenkopf Division were transported to several detention camps inside the Soviet Union. Within six months of the end of the war, many prominent SSTK officers, including Becker, disappeared, most likely the victims of secret executions."

=== Concentration camp personnel ===
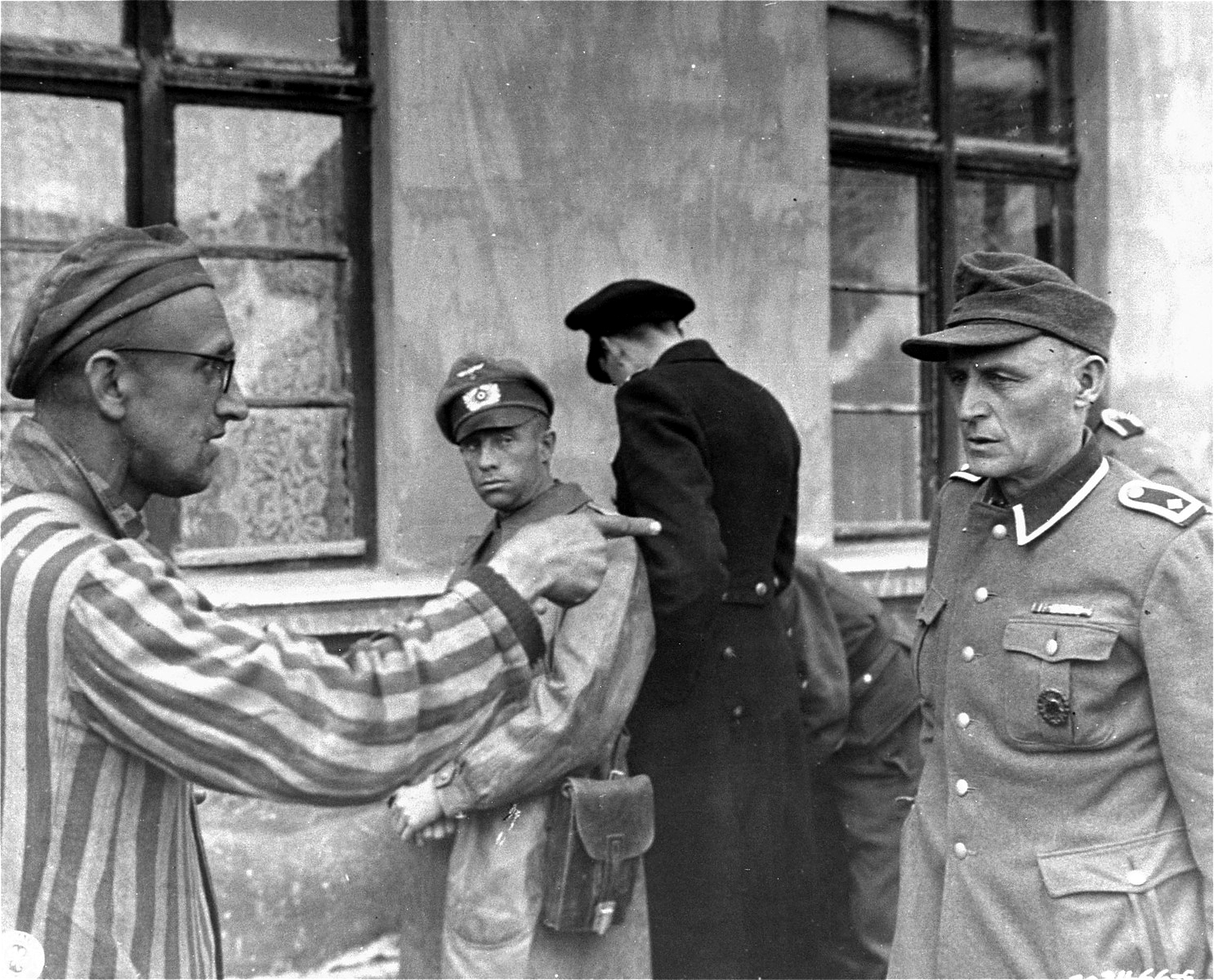
A freed Buchenwald concentration camp prisoner identifies a member of the SS camp guard.

From the SS-TV inception, Eicke fostered an attitude of "inflexible harshness" exercised by the masters. This core belief continued to influence SS guards in all concentration camps even after Eicke had taken over command of the SS Totenkopf Division. Recruits were taught to hate their enemies through tough training regimes and Nazi indoctrination.

Within camps, guards subjugated the inmates in an atmosphere of controlled, disciplined cruelty. This environment of formalized brutality influenced some of the SS-TV's most infamous commandants including Rudolf Höß, Franz Ziereis, Karl Otto Koch, Max Kögel, and Amon Göth.

In the last days of World War II, a special group called the "Auxiliary-SS" (SS-Mannschaft) was formed as a last-ditch effort to keep concentration camps running and allow regular SS personnel to escape. Auxiliary-SS members were not considered regular SS personnel, but were conscripted members from other branches of the German military, the Nazi Party, and the Volkssturm. Such personnel wore a distinctive twin swastika collar patch and served as camp guard and administrative personnel until the surrender of Germany.

=== Profit ===
The SS, individually and collectively, benefited financially from the Holocaust. Slave labour at the camps was sold to private companies, or used to run lucrative SS-run industries, while the cost of prisoner upkeep was minimal. Himmler intended to make concentration camps into a profitable industry for the financial benefit of the SS. Wartime labour shortages meant that the concentration camps ended up as a significant labour source for all sectors of the German economy. The property of murdered Jews was stolen and auctioned off to the German public. Individual personnel at the camps often embezzled some of the stolen property for themselves, and some were charged for theft.

== Combat formations ==
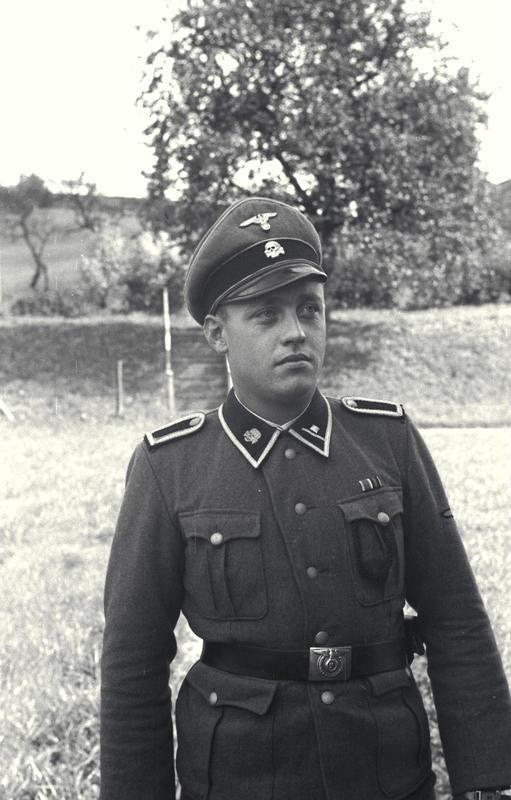
A Scharführer from Mauthausen-Gusen concentration camp in the standard uniform worn by SS-TV. His collar patch displays the Totenkopf insignia worn by concentration camp staff.

- 1st TK-Standarte 'Oberbayern'. Formed 1937 at Dachau. During the Polish invasion conducted so-called "security operations" behind the lines. Which, in reality were operations of terrorizing and murdering the Polish civilian population. Redesignated 1. SS-Totenkopf-Infanterie-Regiment, and assigned to the Totenkopf Division 10/39.
- 2nd TK-Standarte 'Brandenburg'. Formed 1937 at Oranienburg. During the Polish invasion conducted so-called "security operations" behind the lines, which were operations of terrorizing and murdering the Polish civilian population. Redesignated 2. SS-Totenkopf-Infanterie-Regiment, and assigned to the Totenkopf Division 10/39.
- 3rd TK-Standarte 'Thüringen'. Formed 1937 at Buchenwald. During the Polish invasion conducted so-called "security operations" behind the lines, which were operations of terrorizing and murdering the Polish civilian population. Redesignated 3. SS-Totenkopf-Infanterie-Regiment and assigned to the Totenkopf Division, with some men forming the cadre of the 10. TK-Standarte, 11/39.
- 4th TK-Standarte 'Ostmark'. Formed 1938 at Vienna and Berlin. III Sturmbann Götze detached to form the core of SS Heimwehr Danzig 7/39. Garrison duty at Prague 10/39 and in the Netherlands 6/40. Designated 4. SS-Infanterie-Regiment 2/41, assigned to 2. SS-Infanterie-Brigade 5/41.
- SS-Wachsturmbann 'Eimann'. Formed 1939 at Danzig. During the Polish invasion conducted so-called "security operations" behind the lines, which were operations of terrorizing and murdering the Polish civilian population. Dissolved 1940.
- TK-Reiter-Standarte. Formed 9/39 in Poland to conduct so-called "security operations" behind the lines, which were operations of terrorizing and murdering the Polish civilian population. Expanded and divided into 1. and 2. TK-Reiter-Standarten 5/40. Redesignated 1. and 2. SS-Kavallerie-Regimenter 2/41, combined into SS-Kavallerie-Brigade (later SS-Kavallerie-Division 'Florian Geyer') 9/41.
- 5th TK-Standarte 'Dietrich Eckart'. Formed 1939 at Berlin and Oranienburg. Designated 5. SS-Infanterie-Regiment 2/41, assigned to 2. SS-Infanterie-Brigade 5/41.
- 6th TK-Standarte. Formed 1939 at Prague. Garrison duty in Norway 5/40. Designated 6. SS-Infanterie-Regiment 2/41, assigned to Kampfgruppe Nord (later 6. SS-Gebirgs-Division Nord) spring 41.
- 7th TK-Standarte. Formed 1939 at Brno. Garrison duty in Norway 5/40. Designated 7. SS-Infanterie-Regiment 2/41, assigned to Kampfgruppe Nord (later 6. SS-Gebirgs-Division Nord) spring 41.
- 8th TK-Standarte. Formed 1939 at Crakow. Designated 8. SS-Infanterie-Regiment 2/41, assigned to 1. SS-Infanterie-Brigade 4/41.
- 9th TK-Standarte. Formed 1939 at Danzig. Reorganized (with elements of St. 12) into Standarte "K" (Kirkenes, Norway) 8-11/40, redesignated 9. SS-Infanterie-Regiment 2/41, assigned to Kampfgruppe Nord spring 41. Incorporated into SS-Regiment Thule 8/42.
- 10th TK-Standarte. Formed 1939 at Buchenwald. Garrison duties in Poland 1940. Designated 10. SS-Infanterie-Regiment 2/41, assigned to 1. SS-Infanterie-Brigade 4/41.
- 11th TK-Standarte. Formed 1939 at Radom. Garrison duty in the Netherlands 5/40. Assigned to SS-Infanterie-Division (mot) Das Reich to replace the 2. SS-Infanterie-Regiment Germania 12/40 and redesignated 11. SS-Infanterie-Regiment.
- TK-Standarten 12-16 were raised in the winter of 1939–40, but disbanded the following summer, their personnel used to fill out other units.

== See also ==
- German war crimes
- Generalplan Ost
- Glossary of Nazi Germany
- List of SS personnel
- Nazi gold
- Postenpflicht
