= Prisoner functionaries =

Prisoner role within Nazi camps

In Nazi concentration and labor camps the system of Funktionshäftlinge (singular: Funktionshäftling), or prisoner functionaries was developed. These were the prisoners with certain duties of supervision of fellow prisoners, assisting the camp administration and guards (SS-Totenkopfverbände), in exchange for various privileges. These should be distinguished from various work units known as Sonderkommando (not to be confused with the SS-Sonderkommandos). Of these, best known are Kapos.

The system was introduced in early Nazi camps of 1933–1934. An estimated 10% of the Nazi camp population were Funktionshäftlinge.

The position of Funktionshäftlinge was controversial in many respects. Their life was easier, but they were hated by others. Further, they were split in their motivations for choosing this work: some of them were true agents of the SS or enjoyed the vested power, while others used their position to help the survival of other prisoners (often prioritizing their preferred prisoners).

== Hierarchy ==
- Häftlingsselbstverwaltung (Prisoner self-administration)
  - Camp elders (Lagerälteste)
  - Block elders (Blockälteste)
  - Room elders (Stubenälteste)

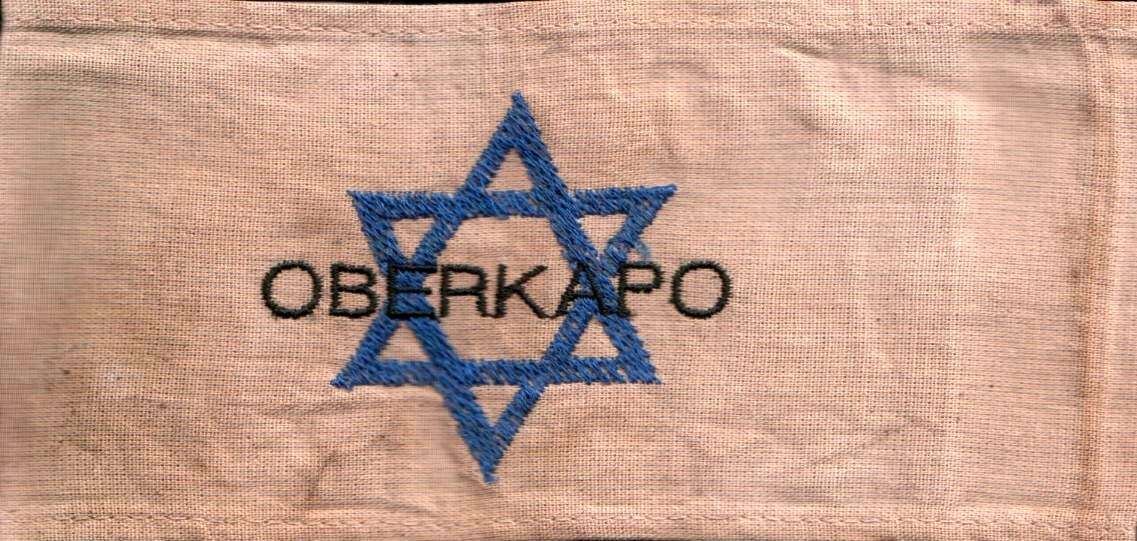
A Jewish oberkapo armband

- Order management
  - Oberkapo
  - Kapo
  - Vorarbeiter (foreman)
- Service (kitchen, office, laundry, warehouse, infirmary, etc.)

The important functionary positions inside the camp were Lagerältester (camp leader or camp senior), Blockältester (block or barracks leader or senior), and Stubenältester (room leader). (Note: Ältester is variously translated as "leader", "elder", "supervisor", "commander" or "senior".) The highest position that a prisoner could reach was Lagerältester, who was placed directly under the camp commandant and expected to implement his orders to ensure that the camp's daily routines ran smoothly and that regulations were followed. The Lagerälteste had a key role in the selection of other prisoners as functionaries, making recommendations to the SS. Though dependent on the goodwill of the SS, through them, he had access to special privileges, such as access to civilian clothes or a private room.

The Blockältester (block or barracks leader) had to ensure that rules were followed in the individual barracks. He or she was also responsible for the prisoners in the barracks. The Stubenälteste (room leader) was responsible for the hygiene, such as delousing, and order of each room in a barracks. The Blockschreiber (registrar or barrack clerk) was a record-keeping job that included tasks such as keeping track at roll calls.

Work crews outside the camp were supervised by a Vorarbeiter (foreman), a Kapo, or Oberkapo (chief kapo). These functionaries pushed their fellow prisoners to work harder, hitting, beating, and even killing them.

== System of thrift and manipulation ==
Camps were controlled by the SS, but day-to-day organization was supplemented by the system of functionary prisoners, a second hierarchy that made it easier for the Nazis to control the camps. These prisoners made it possible for the camps to function with fewer SS personnel. The prisoner functionaries sometimes numbered as high as 10% of the inmates. The Nazis were able to keep the number of paid staff who had direct contact with the prisoners very low in comparison to normal prisons today. Without the functionary prisoners, the SS camp administrations would not have been able to keep the day-to-day operations of the camps running smoothly. The kapos often did this work for extra food, cigarettes, alcohol or other privileges.

At Buchenwald, these tasks were originally assigned to criminal prisoners, but after 1939, political prisoners began to displace the criminal prisoners, though criminals were preferred by the SS. At Mauthausen, on the other hand, functionary positions remained dominated by criminal prisoners until just before liberation. The system and hierarchy also inhibited solidarity among the prisoners. There were tensions between the various nationalities and prisoner groups, who were distinguished by different Nazi concentration camp badges. Jews wore yellow stars; other prisoners wore colored triangles pointed downward.

Prisoner functionaries were often hated by other prisoners and spat upon as Nazi henchmen. While some barrack leaders (Blockälteste) tried to assist the prisoners under their command by secretly helping them get extra food or easier jobs, others were more concerned with their own survival and, to that end, did more to assist the SS.

Identified by green triangles, the Berufsverbrecher or "BV" ("career criminals") kapos, were called "professional criminals" by other prisoners and were known for their brutality and lack of scruples. Indeed, they were selected by the SS because of those qualities. According to former prisoners, criminal functionaries were more apt to be helpful to the SS than political functionaries, who were more apt to be helpful to other prisoners.

From Oliver Lustig's Dictionary of the Camp:

Vincenzo and Luigi Pappalettera wrote in their book The Brutes Have the Floor that, every time a new transport of detainees arrived at Mauthausen, Kapo August Adam picked out the professors, lawyers, priests and magistrates and cynically asked them: "Are you a lawyer? A professor? Good! Do you see this green triangle? This means I am a killer. I have five convictions on my record: one for manslaughter and four for robbery. Well, here I am in command. The world has turned upside down, did you get that? Do you need a Dolmetscher, an interpreter? Here it is!" And he was pointing to his bat, after which he struck. When he was satisfied, he formed a Scheisskompanie with those selected and sent them to clean the latrines.

== Domination and terror ==
The SS used domination and terror to control the camps' large populations with just a few SS functionaries. The system of prisoner functionaries was a "key instrument of domination", and was commonly called "prisoner self-government" (Häftlings-Selbstverwaltung) in SS parlance.

The camp's draconian rules, constant threat of beatings, humiliation, punishment, and the practice of punishing entire groups for the actions of one prisoner were psychological and physical torments added to the starvation and physical exhaustion from back-breaking labor. Prisoner guards were used to push other inmates to work harder, saving the need for paid SS supervision. Many kapos felt caught in the middle, being both victims and perpetrators. Though kapos generally had a bad reputation, many suffered guilt about their actions, both at the time and after the war, as revealed in a book about Jewish kapos.

Many prisoner functionaries, primarily from the ranks of the "greens" or criminal prisoners, could be quite ruthless in order to justify their privileges, especially when an SS man was around. They also played an active role in the beatings, even killing fellow prisoners. One non-criminal functionary was Josef Heiden, a notorious Austrian political prisoner. Feared and hated, he was known as a sadist and was responsible for several deaths. He was released from Dachau in 1942 and became a member of the Waffen-SS. Some guards were personally involved in the mass murder of other prisoners. Rudolf Höss also testified that some "greens" killed French Jewish women by axing, throttling and tearing them to pieces. Beginning in October 1944, criminal functionaries from among the German Reichsdeutsche were sought out for transfer to the Dirlewanger Brigade.

== Functioning ==
Prisoner functionaries could often help other prisoners by getting them into better barracks or assigned to lighter work. On occasion, the functionaries could effect other prisoners' removal from transport lists or even secure new identities in order to protect them from persecution. This assistance was generally limited to the prisoners in the functionary's own group (fellow citizens or political comrades). The prisoner functionaries were in a precarious hierarchy between their fellow inmates and the SS. This situation was intentionally created, as revealed in a speech by Heinrich Himmler.

The moment he becomes a Kapo, he no longer sleeps with them. He is held accountable for the performance of the work, that they are clean, that the beds are well-built. [...] So, he must drive his men. The moment we become dissatisfied with him, he is no longer Kapo, he's back to sleeping with his men. And he knows that he will be beaten to death by them the first night. — Heinrich Himmler, 21 June 1944

In National Socialism's racial ideology, some races were "superior" and others "inferior". Similarly, the SS sometimes had racial criteria for the prisoner functionaries; one sometimes had to be racially "superior" to be a functionary. The group category was also sometimes a factor. A knowledge of foreign languages was also advantageous, particularly as the international population of the camps increased, and because the SS preferred a certain level of education.

An eager prisoner functionary could have a camp "career" as an SS favorite and be promoted from Kapo to Oberkapo and eventually to Lagerältester, but could also just as easily run afoul of the SS and be sent to the gas chambers.

== See also ==
- Jewish Ghetto Police
