= Types of Nazi camps =

Types of Nazi detention and murder facilities

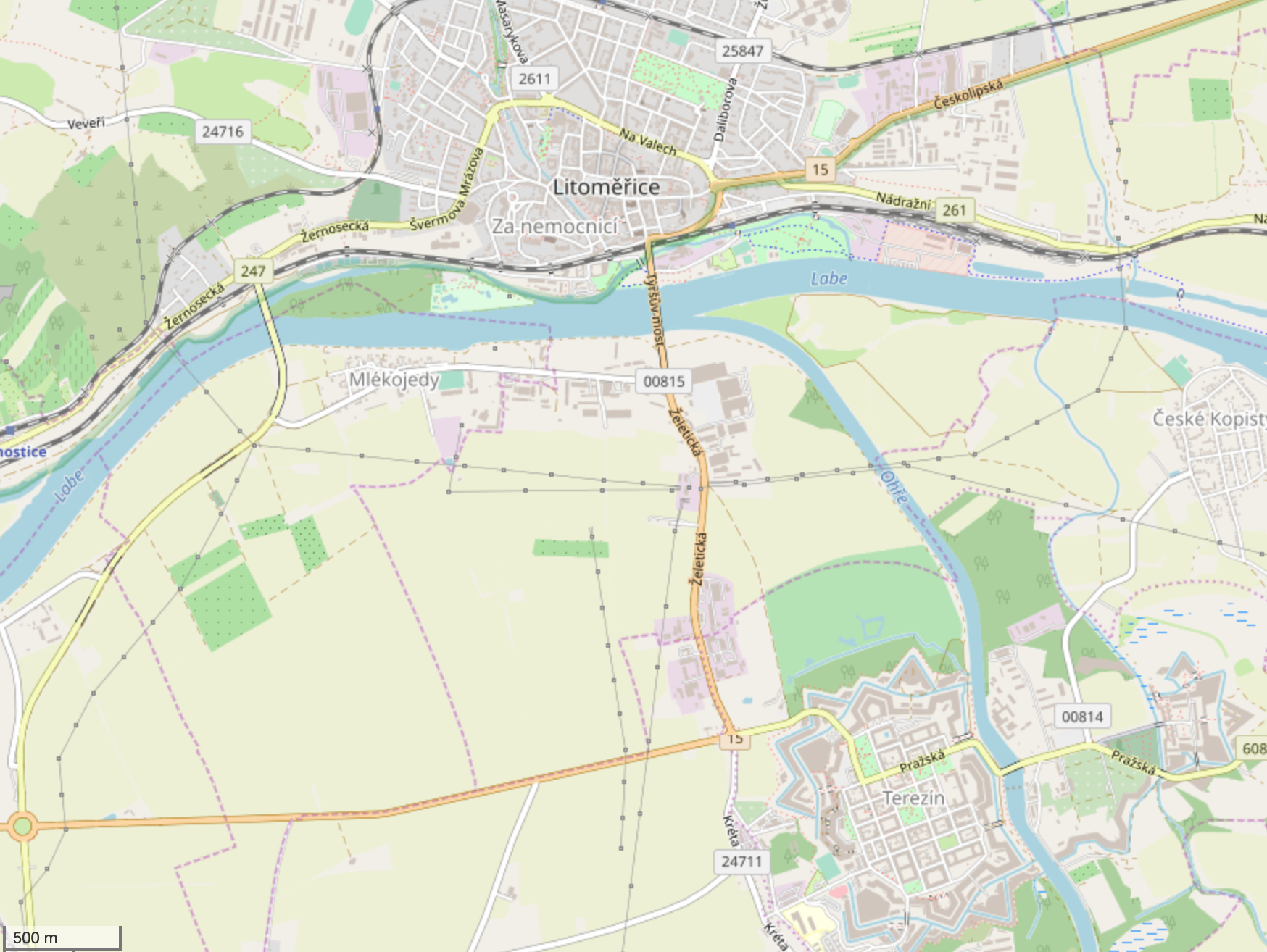
Near Leitmeritz there were three types of Nazi detention facilities: Leitmeritz concentration camp, a subcamp of Flossenbürg; Theresienstadt Ghetto (lower right, west of the Eger River) and Theresienstadt Small Fortress, a Gestapo prison.

Nazi camps refer to various types of internment sites operated by Nazi Germany. More specifically, Nazi concentration camps refers to the camps run by the Concentration Camps Inspectorate and later the SS Main Economic and Administrative Office. The Nazi regime employed various types of detention and murder facilities within Germany and the territory it conquered and occupied, while Nazi allies also operated their own internment facilities.

The editors of Encyclopedia of Camps and Ghettos estimate that these sites totaled more than 42,500 locations, of which 980 were German Nazi concentration camps proper.

== Nazi Germany ==
Types of detention and murder facilities employed by the Nazi regime included:

Type	German name	Description
Civilian workers camp	Gemeinschaftslager	
Custody camp	Haftlager	
Civilian internment camp	Internierungslager (Ilag)	Camp to hold Allied civilians caught in areas that were occupied by the German Army
Camp for Jews	Judenlager (Julag), Umschulungslager, Zwangsarbeitslager für Juden	
Concentration camp	Konzentrationslager	Camp for the mass detention without trial of civilians, ethnic minorities, political opponents, etc.
Early camps		
Aktion T4 Euthanasia center	Euthanasie-Tötungsanstalt, T4-Tötungsanstalt	Center for murder of mentally ill or physically disabled people by involuntary euthanasia
Extermination camp	Vernichtungslager	Six killing centers for the dedicated purpose of systematic mass murder, primarily of Jews
Forced (slave) labor camp	Zwangsarbeitslager	
Jewish ghetto	Jüdischer Wohnbezirk	
Germanization facilities		
Gestapo camps		
Gypsy camps	Zigeunerlager	
Housing camp	Wohnlager	
Labor camp	Arbeitslager	
Military brothels		
National Labor Service camp	RAD (Reichsarbeitsdienst)-Lager	
Penal or punishment camp	Strafgefangenenlager and Straflager	
Preferential camp	Vorzugslager	
Prisoner-of-war camp	Kriegsgefangenenlager	Imprisonment camp for Allied military personnel captured and held under the terms of the Third Geneva Convention
Police custody camp	Polizeihaftlager	
Prisons		
Satellite camp	Außenkommando	Outlying camp under command of a main concentration camp; main camps were Stammlager and subordinate camps were Außenlager
Security camp	Schutzhaftlager	
Special camp	Sonderlager	
Workers education camp	Arbeitserziehungslager	
Work house	Arbeitshaus	
Transit camp	Durchgangslager	Camps where prisoners were briefly detained prior to deportation to other Nazi camps.
Youth protection camp	Jugendschutzlager	
Youth detention camp	Jugendverwahrungslager	

== Nazi Allies ==
Nazi allies also operated their own internment facilities, including:

- Internment camps in Bulgaria
- Concentration camps in the Independent State of Croatia
- Internment camps in Finland
- Internment camps in France
  - Internment camps in French North Africa
- Internment camps in Hungary
- Concentration camps of Italy
- Concentration camps in Norway
- Internment camps of Romania
- Internment camps in the Slovak State
- Concentration camps in Tunisia

== See also ==
- List of Nazi extermination camps and euthanasia centers
- List of Nazi concentration camps
