= List of Nazi concentration camps =

Nazi concentration camps
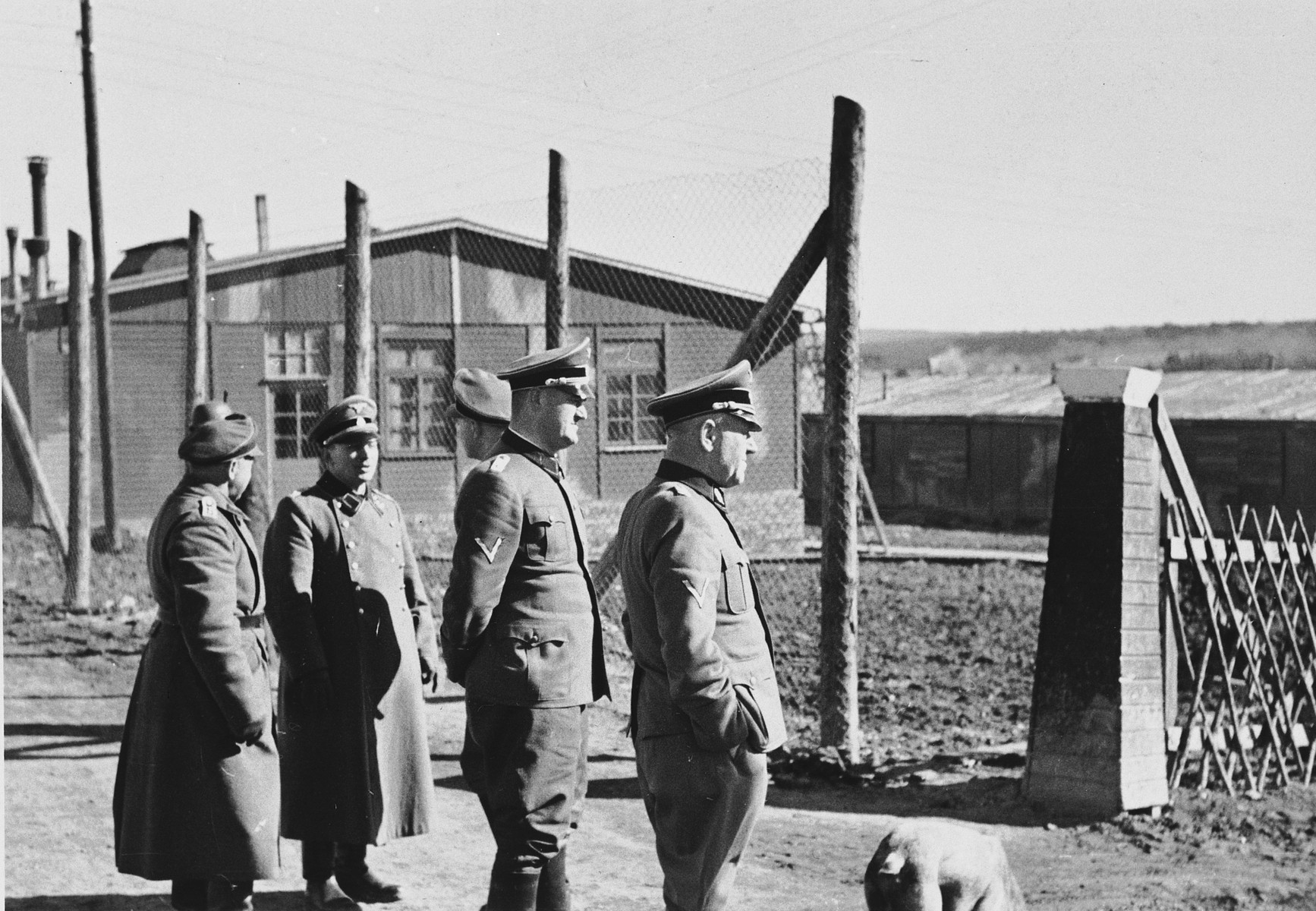
- SS men and barracks at Hinzert

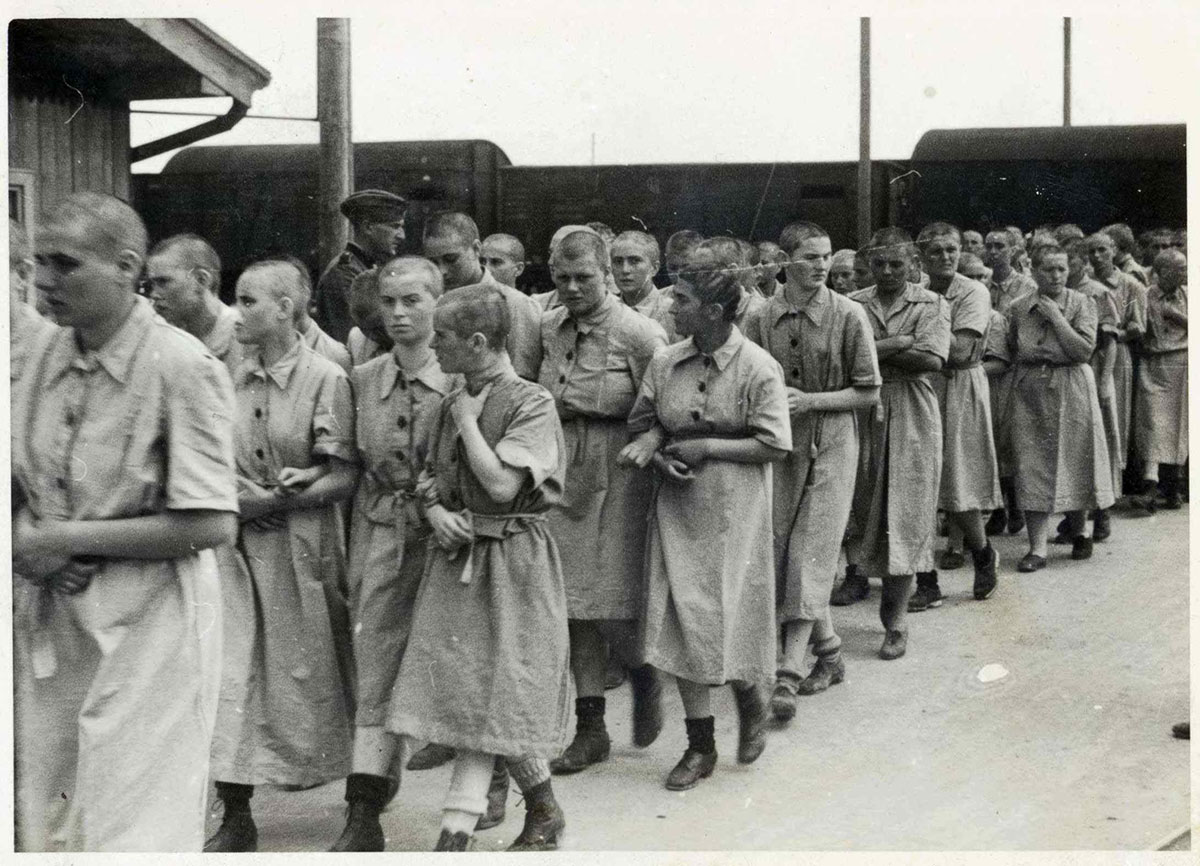
- Jewish women selected for work at Auschwitz II-Birkenau

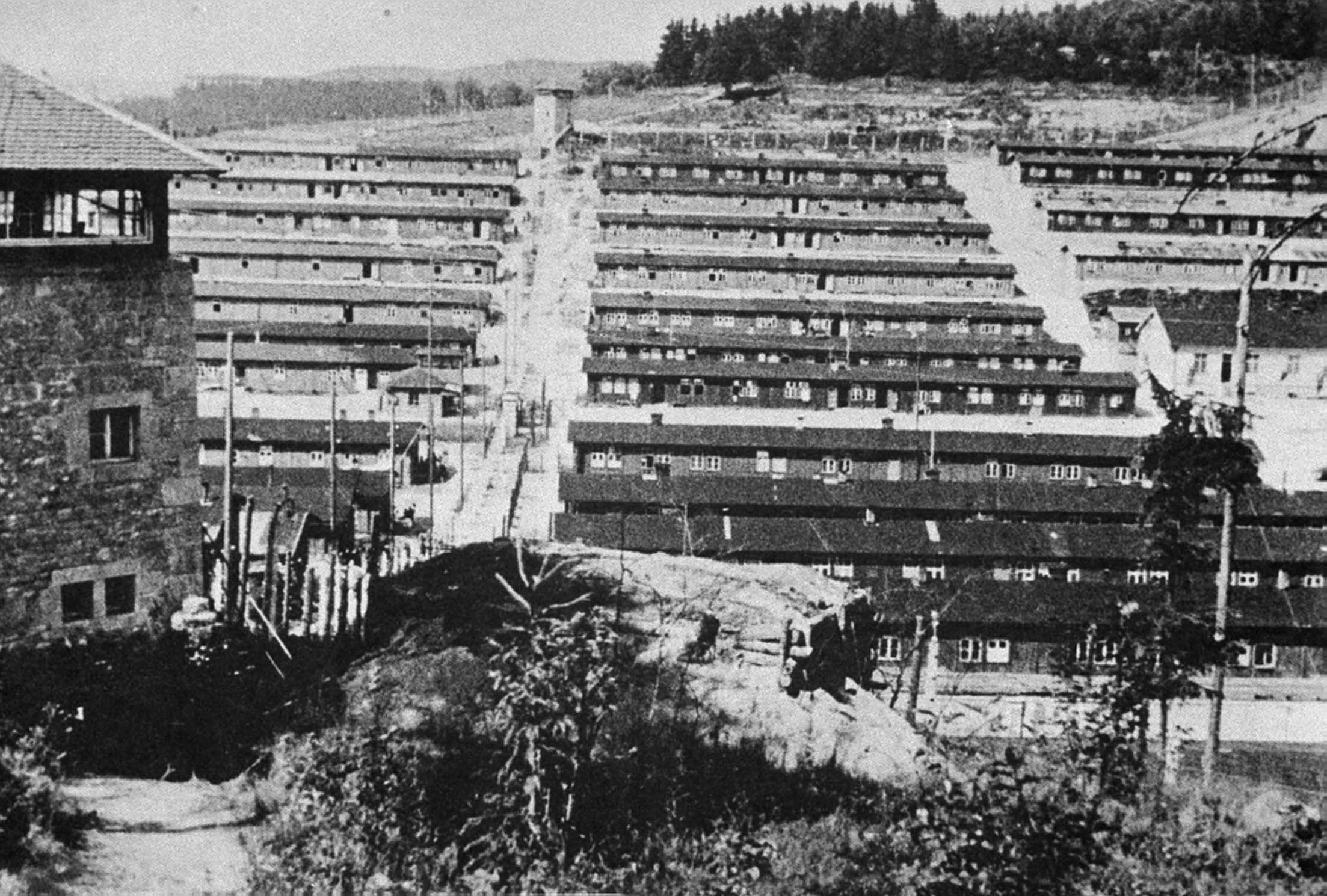
- View of Flossenbürg after liberation

According to the Encyclopedia of Camps and Ghettos, there were 23 main concentration camps (German: Stammlager), of which most had a system of satellite camps. Including the satellite camps, the total number of Nazi concentration camps that existed at one point in time is at least a thousand, although these did not all exist at the same time.

== List of camps ==
=== Early camps ===
- Breitenau concentration camp
- Breslau-Dürrgoy concentration camp
- Columbia concentration camp
- Esterwegen concentration camp
- Kemna concentration camp
- Kislau concentration camp
- Lichtenburg concentration camp
- Missler concentration camp
- Nohra concentration camp
- Oranienburg concentration camp
- Osthofen concentration camp
- Sachsenburg concentration camp
- Sonnenburg concentration camp
- Vulkanwerft concentration camp

=== Main camps ===
- Arbeitsdorf concentration camp
- Auschwitz concentration camp
  - List of subcamps of Auschwitz
- Bergen-Belsen concentration camp
  - List of subcamps of Bergen-Belsen
- Buchenwald concentration camp
  - List of subcamps of Buchenwald
- Dachau concentration camp
  - List of subcamps of Dachau
- Flossenbürg concentration camp
  - List of subcamps of Flossenbürg
- Gross-Rosen concentration camp
  - List of subcamps of Gross-Rosen
- Herzogenbusch concentration camp
  - List of subcamps of Herzogenbusch
- Hinzert concentration camp
  - List of subcamps of Hinzert
- Kaiserwald concentration camp
  - List of subcamps of Kaiserwald
- Kauen concentration camp
  - List of subcamps of Kauen
- Kraków-Płaszów concentration camp
  - List of subcamps of Kraków-Płaszów
- Majdanek concentration camp
  - List of subcamps of Majdanek
- Mauthausen concentration camp
  - List of subcamps of Mauthausen
- Mittelbau-Dora concentration camp
  - List of subcamps of Mittelbau
- Natzweiler-Struthof concentration camp
  - List of subcamps of Natzweiler-Struthof
- Neuengamme concentration camp
  - List of subcamps of Neuengamme
- Niederhagen concentration camp
- Ravensbrück concentration camp
  - List of subcamps of Ravensbrück
- Sachsenhausen concentration camp
  - List of subcamps of Sachsenhausen
- Stutthof concentration camp
  - List of subcamps of Stutthof
- Vaivara concentration camp
  - List of subcamps of Vaivara
- Warsaw concentration camp

== See also ==
- List of Nazi extermination camps and euthanasia centers
