= Malchow concentration camp =

Coordinates: 53°28′N 12°25′E

Malchow was one of the numerous sub-camps of Nazi concentration camp: Ravensbrück, located in Germany, which is believed to be first opened in the winter of 1943. It was located at Malchow in Mecklenburg.

== Size of the Malchow camp ==
The Malchow camp system consisted of ten barracks on the terrain of the Ravensbrück concentration camp, which each had the capacity to house about 100 women. This meant that the Malchow camp was able to house 1,000 women prisoners. But, by 1945, the camp population had grown to 5,000 women. In the summer of 1943, the camp terrain finally became enclosed by a high fence. The ten barracks that were part of the camp, which was originally used for the construction workers of Ravensbrück, were enclosed by this fence.

== Conditions and life in the camp ==
Day-to-day conditions in the camp were almost unbearable. The prisoners were forced against their will to stand at attention for roll call, twice a day, like most regular concentration camp prisoners would have to do. The prisoners were guarded under the watchful eyes of the Schutzstaffel (SS) female guards and their German Shepherd Dogs. The SS were very cruel, but probably one of the harshest female guards at Malchow was the SS wardress Luise Danz. She was transferred from the main camp of Ravensbrück to Malchow and became commandant of the camp. She was captured in 1945 and put on trial for crimes against humanity at the Auschwitz trial in Kraków, Poland. She was sentenced to life imprisonment in 1947, but released due to general amnesty on 20 August 1957

In Malchow, the prisoners barely received anything to eat and were forced to kneel on sharp gravel stones. Body searches and beatings were routine at Malchow. Although residents of the town of Malchow were not allowed to have any contact with the prisoners of the camp, some townspeople provided the inmates with supplies of food. When they were discovered by the SS, they too were imprisoned in Malchow. Aside from starvation and exhaustion, many prisoners also died during many epidemics of diseases such as tuberculosis and typhus. Some types of forced labor that the prisoners had to do were producing mines, collecting nettles from children's playgrounds, cleaning the factory and town, building canals for the hospital of Malchow, and doing horticultural work.

== Malchow as a transit camp ==
During 1944, when most of the death marches were taking place across Europe, Malchow served as a transit camp for other prisoners arriving from other concentration camps. Eyewitness reports of many Malchow survivors say that a transport of about 1,000 concentration camp prisoners arrived at the camp on 24 November 1944. They had traveled on a death march for several weeks. There, at Malchow, they were brought to Wismar, and placed on barges that were sunk in the Baltic Sea or a nearby river.

== Liberation of Malchow ==
On 2 May 1945, Malchow, and the rest of Ravensbrück was liberated by the Red Army.

== Notable survivors ==
- Hanna Zemer, Slovak-born Israeli journalist
- Liliana Segre, Italian Senator
- Berta Berkovich Kohut, Hungarian-born Jewish inmate among the Dressmakers of Auschwitz, liberated from Malchow after arriving in the Auschwitz death march

== See also ==
- The Holocaust
- Ravensbrück
- List of concentration and internment camps
- List of Nazi-German concentration camps
- List of subcamps of Ravensbrück
- Nazi concentration camps
- World War II

== Notes and references ==
- United States Holocaust Memorial Museum Website. Displaying 1–25 of 60 matches for "Malchow". Retrieved 24 February 2015.
