= Pravieniškės =

- Village
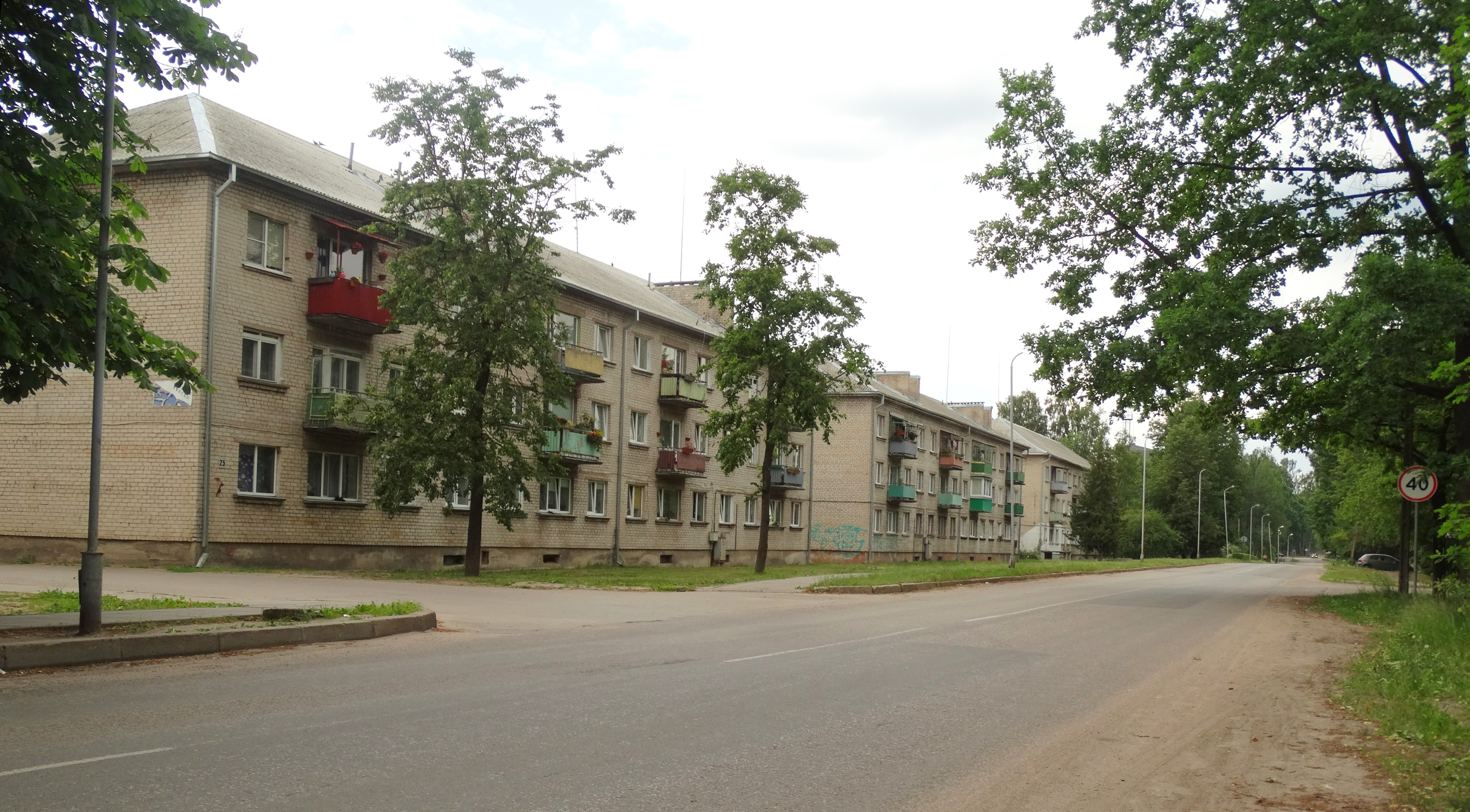
- Residential buildings in Pravieniškės

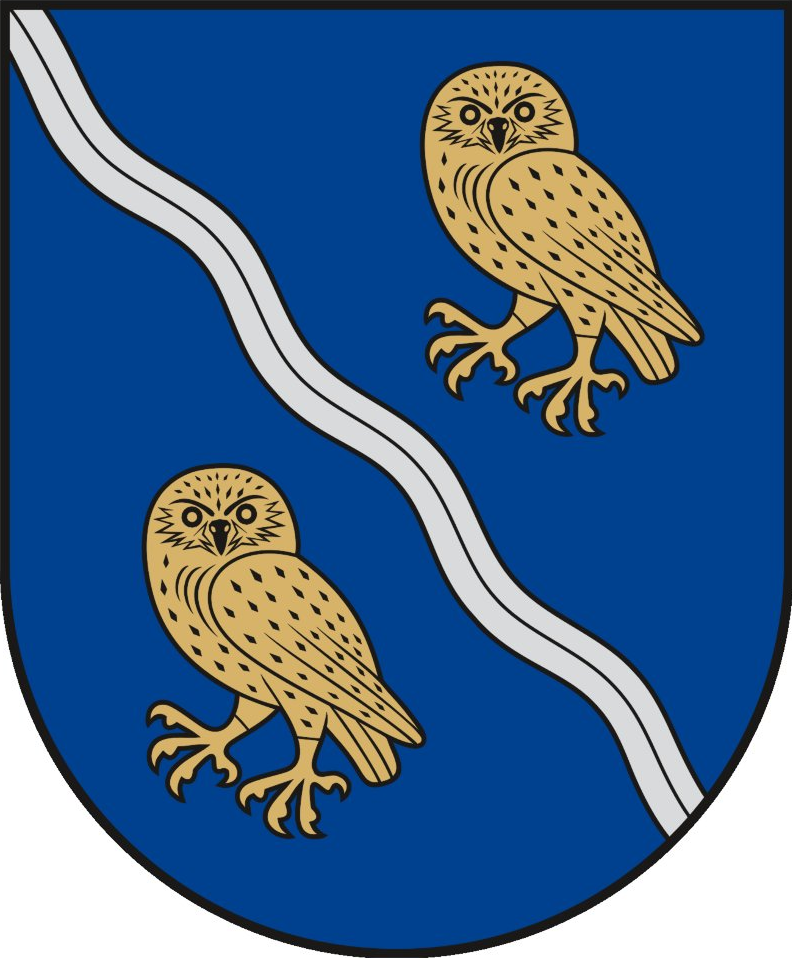
- Coat of arms

- Location of Pravieniškės
- Coordinates: 54°54′00″N 24°13′21″E
- Country: Lithuania
- County: Kaunas County
- Municipality: Kaišiadorys District Municipality
- Eldership: Pravieniškės Eldership
- Capital of: Pravieniškės Eldership

Population (2021)
  - Total: 3,165
- Time zone: UTC+2 (EET)
  - Summer (DST): UTC+3 (EEST)

Pravieniškės is a village in central Lithuania. Prior to 2016, there were two villages, separated by the Praviena river, known as Pravieniškės I (old village and railroad station) and Pravieniškės II (prison). Effective 26 October 2016, the two villages were merged into one. According to the 2021 census, the combined village had a population of 3,165. The village is known as the location of Pravieniškės Prison, the largest in Lithuania. During the German occupation of Lithuania, the prison was one of the sub-camps of the Kaunas concentration camp and the location of several mass executions of inmates.

== Geography ==
Pravieniškės is situated along the Praviena river (right tributary of the Neman River). It is located about 20 kilometres (12 mi) east of Kaunas and 17 kilometres (11 mi) west of Kaišiadorys. The village is surrounded by a forest that spans 5,098 hectares (12,600 acres) and is part of the larger Gaižiūnai Forest. The village also has peat deposits that measure about 500–600 hectares (1,200–1,500 acres).

== History ==
One flint and two stone axes have been found in the village. About a hundred tumuli that date to the 9–11th centuries are located about 2 kilometres (1.2 mi) east of the village. Bronius Kviklys wrote in his work Mūsų Lietuva that Pravieniškės was first mentioned in 1613, but this information cannot be verified. The first reliably known mention of the village comes from baptismal records of December 1769.

The village developed after a train station was constructed in 1861 on the Vilnius–Kaunas Railway. The railroad culvert built across the Praviena stream is recognized as an engineering monument of heritage. On 14 July 1912, a fire broke out in the village. Fifteen residential buildings were destroyed.

On 22 June 1941, at the start of the German invasion of the Soviet Union, German airplanes dropped two bombs on the village, hitting the train station building and the railroad tracks. Sometime in fall 1942 – winter 1943, Soviet partisans burned down fuel storage in Pravieniškės. On 26 July 1944, the village saw some action between the Wehrmacht and the Red Army: Germans tried to counterattack to keep the railway station, but lost two armored vehicles and were pushed back by the Russians who lost twelve men.

During the post-war years, village residents suffered from Soviet repressions. At least 10 residents were arrested and at least 13 were deported to Siberia in 1944–1951. The village established a collective farm (kolkhoz) in April 1950. It was named "Path to Freedom" (Kelias į laisvę).

In 1963, school children accidentally found remains of a Soviet airplane in a nearby forest. It was determined that the plane, piloted by Dmitrijus Otiakovskis, was shot down by the Germans on 26 June 1944. A memorial, featuring a blue propeller, was built in 1986.

The village's coat of arms were approved by President Dalia Grybauskaitė in January 2015. It depicts two golden Eurasian pygmy owls, which is listed as an endangered species in Lithuania, separated by a silver river.

== Demographics ==
Historical population
Year	Pravieniškės I	Pravieniškės II	Combined
1923	406		
1959	816	381	
1970	582	443	
1979	459	979	
1989	506	1,353	
2001	562	2,672	
2011	459	3,534	
2021			3,165

The number of residents in Pravieniškės II includes inmates of the prison. In 2021, there were 1,757 inmates in the Pravieniškės prison system.

== Education ==
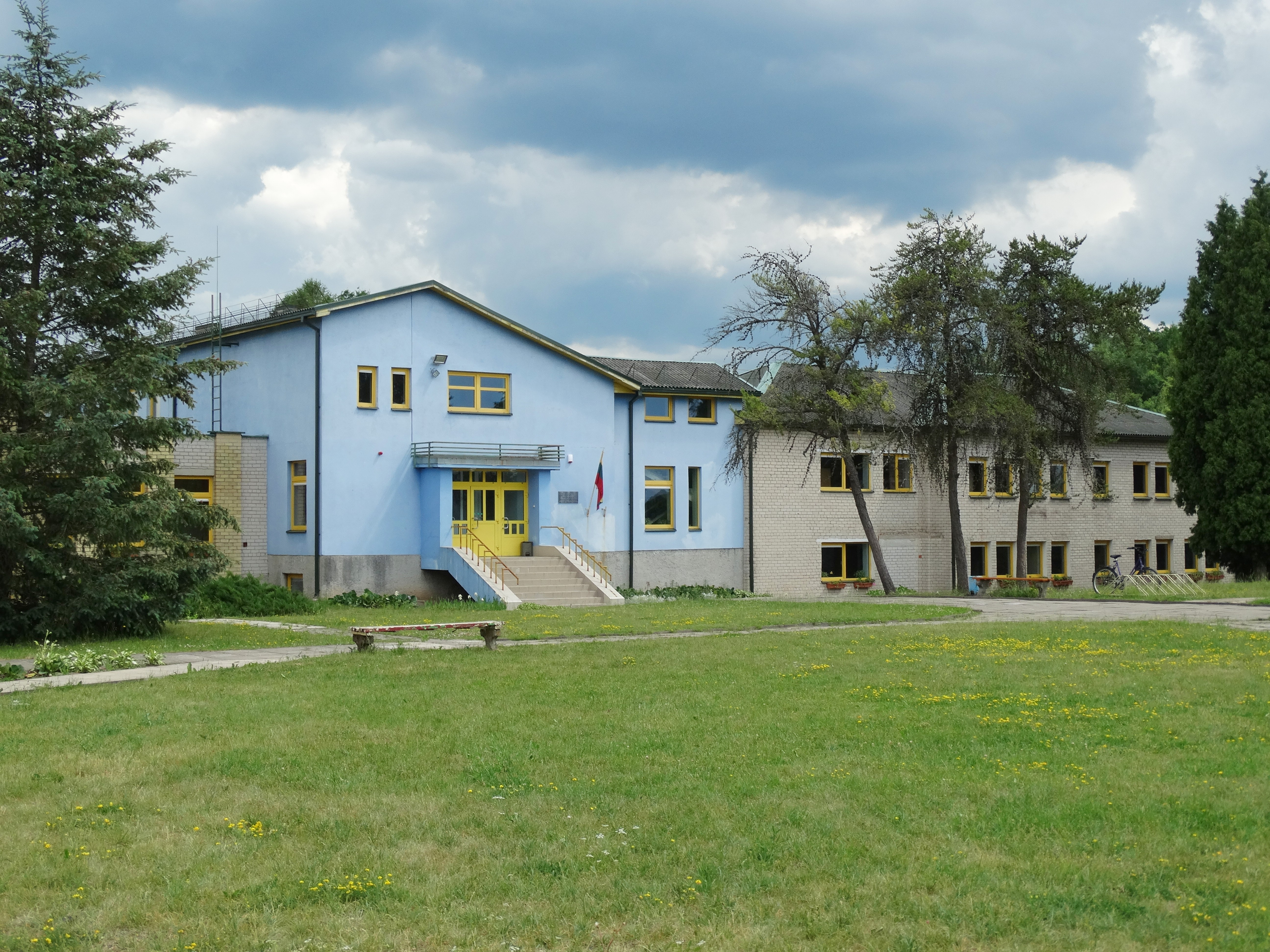
Former middle school

During the Lithuanian press ban, the villagers employed two teachers who taught the children Lithuanian illegally. A primary school was opened before 1920. In 1938, it had 83 students. In the post-war years, the school was reorganized into a seven-year, later eight- and nine-year, school. It had 115 students during the 1957/58 school year. In February 1996, the school was named in memory of Stasys Tijūnaitis, teacher and member of the Constituent Assembly of Lithuania. In 2006, the school had 126 students. In March 2019, the school was merged with the Rumšiškės Antanas Baranauskas Gymnasium.

== Labor camp and prison ==
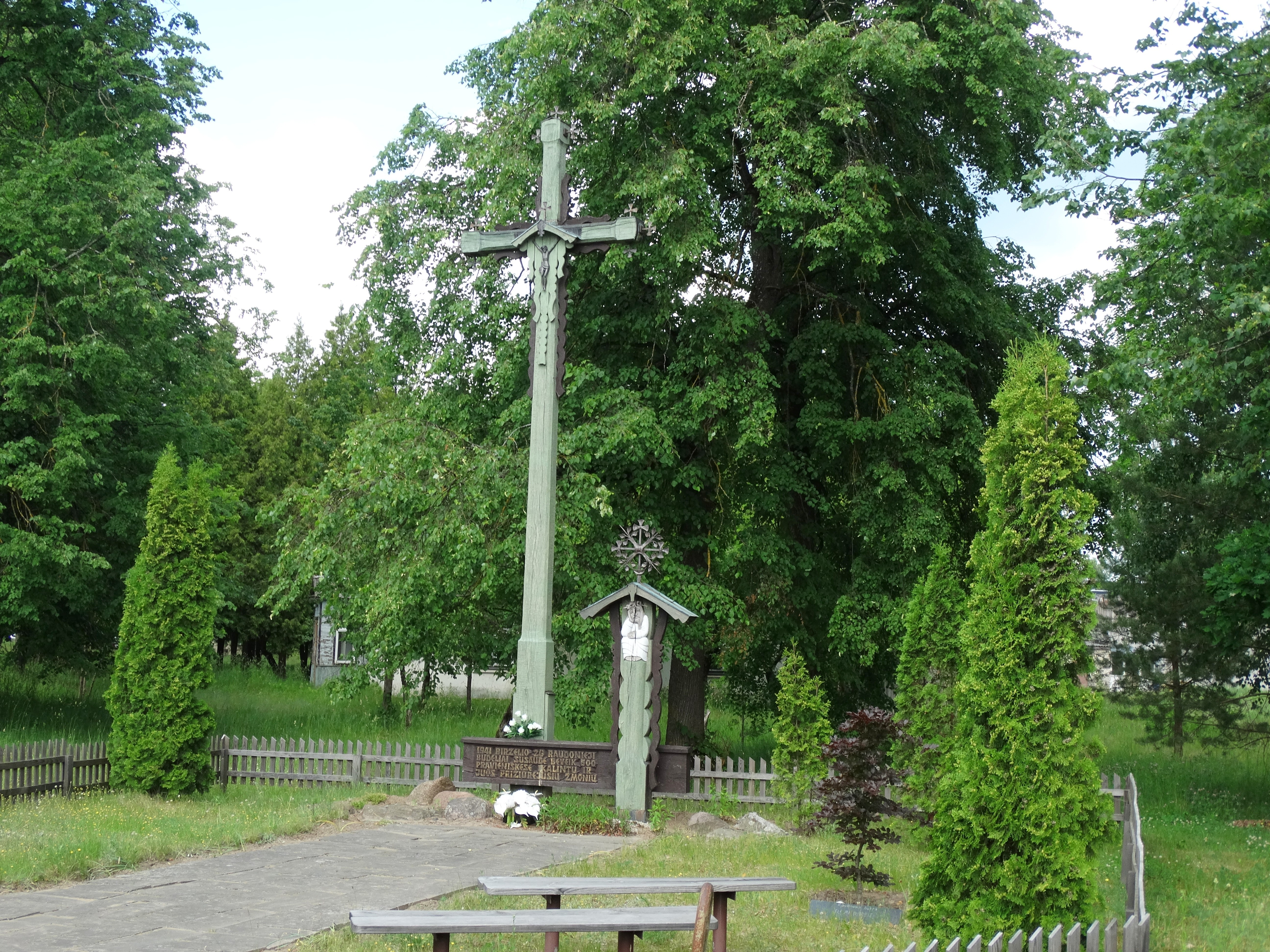
Memorial cross for the victims of the 26 June 1941 massacre

Around 1930, commercially viable peat deposits that could be used for fuel were discovered about 2 kilometres (1.2 mi) north of the original settlement. An area of about 60 hectares (150 acres) was acquired by Kaunas Prison and a forced labour camp was established to extract the peat and process timber. After the Soviet occupation of Lithuania in 1940, Dimitravas forced labour camp was moved to Pravieniškės. The camp was classified as a corrective labor colony. At the start of the German invasion of the Soviet Union, the colony had about 450 inmates. On 26 June 1941, NKVD executed about 260 people, including prison guards. It was one of many NKVD prisoner massacres.

During the German occupation of Lithuania, the labor camp, known as Prawienischken in German, was reorganized as a forced labor camp for Jews (Zwangsarbeitslager für Juden) and later became one of the sub-camps of the Kaunas concentration camp. The camp was also one of the main places for concentrating the Romani people. According to the Jäger Report, Germans executed 253 Jews in near the camp on 4 September 1941. On 10 July 1944, Germans executed about 250 Jews transported from France. These were not the only mass executions at the camp. According to a camp survivor, there were at least three other executions of Romani in 1943–1944.

After the return of the Soviets, the camp was designated as the Corrective labor colony no. 2 (colony no. 1 was in Vilnius). It was approved for a maximum capacity of 1,000 inmates. Two more sections were built in 1968 (for first-time offenders) and in 1973 (medical and labor dispensary for forced treatment for drug addiction and alcoholism). After Lithuania regained independence, the prison implemented several projects to promote prisoner social integration, including establishing an open prison (atviroji kolonija) in 2004 (first inmates transferred from Kybartai), opening a halfway house in 2017, and allowing certain inmates to live outside the prison. When Lukiškės Prison was closed in 2019, inmates serving life sentences were moved to Pravieniškės.
