= List of subcamps of Dachau =

Nazi subcamps for the Dachau concentration camp

Below is the list of subcamps of the Dachau complex of Nazi concentration camps.

- Allach
- Aufkirch
- Augsburg
- Bad Ischl
- Bad Tölz
- Asbach-Bäumenheim
- Bayersoien
- Bayrisch Zell
- Birgsau
- Blaichach
- Bruck
- Burgau/Günzburg
- Dachau
- Eching
- Echterdingen
- Ellwangen
- Emmerting
- Eschelbach
- Feistenau
- Feldafing
- Fischbachau
- Fischen
- Fischhorn, Bruck
- Friedolfing
- Friedrichshafen
- Füssen
- Gablingen
- Garmisch-Partenkirchen
- Germering
- Gmund
- Halfing
- Hallein
- Hausham
- Heidenheim
- Heppenheim
- Horgau
- Innsbruck
- Itter Castle
- Karlsfeld
- Kaufbeuren
- Kaufering
- Kempten
- Königssee
- Kottern
- Landsberg
- Landshut
- Lauingen
- Lind Castle in Neumarkt in Steiermark
- Lochau
- Markt Schwaben
- Mauthausen
- Moschendorf
- Mühldorf
- Mühlheim
- München-Giesing - Agfa Kamerawerke
- München-Schwabing - also known as Schwester Pia
- Neustift
- Nürnberg
- Oberdorf, Bad Hindelang
- Oberföhring
- Ottobrunn
- Passau
- Pfersee
- Plansee
- Pollnhof
- Radolfzell
- Rohrdorf, Bavaria
- Rorgsachwaige
- Rothschwaige
- Salzburg
- Saulgau
- Schlachters-Sigmarszell
- Schleissheim
- Seehausen
- Spitzingsee
- Steinhoering
- Stephanskirchen
- St Gilgen
- St Lambrecht
- St Wolfgang
- Traunstein
- Trostberg
- Türkenfeld
- Türkheim
- Tutzing
- Überlingen-Aufkirch
- Ulm
- Utting
- Valepp
- Vulpmes
- Uttendorf-Weisssee
- Wolfratshausen
- Zangberg

== See also ==
- List of Nazi-German concentration camps
- List of subcamps of Mauthausen, other extensive net of camps operating in Austria and southern Germany
- Website with camp names
