= Missler =

Missler may refer to:

- Chuck Missler (1934–2018), American author
- Missler concentration camp, a concentration camp in Nazi Germany
- Missler, Kansas, an unincorporated community in the United States
