= List of subcamps of Ravensbrück =

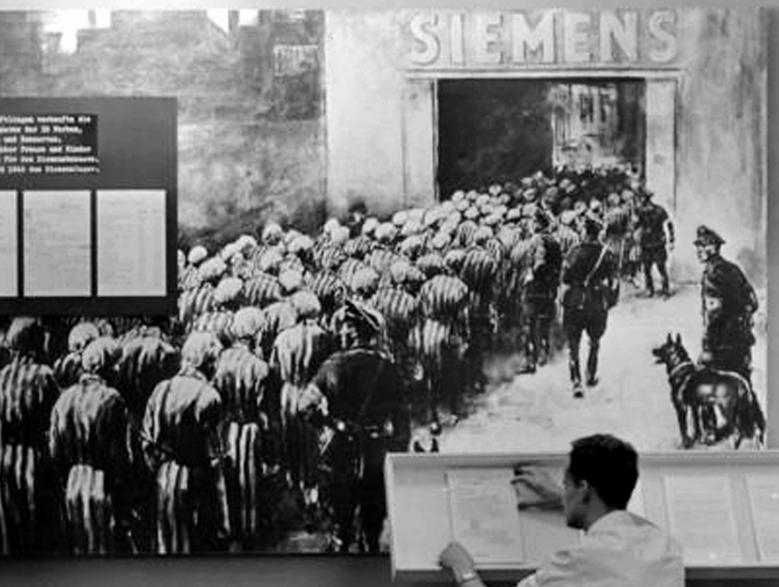
The 1959 opening of the Ravensbrück Museum. Wall display showing female prisoners entering Siemens factory under the SS guard.

The following, is the list of subcamps of the Ravensbrück concentration camp complex built and run by Nazi Germany during World War II. By 1944 Ravensbrück consisted of a system of between 31, and 40, and up to 70 subcamps, spread out from Austria to the Baltic Sea, with over 70,000 predominantly female prisoners. It was the only major Nazi camp for women.

== Selected locations and firms ==
1. Altdorf Lake, for Heinkel-Flugzeugwerke
2. Altenburg (over 1,000 prisoners; became a subcamp of Buchenwald in 1944)
3. Ansbach
4. Barth (over 1,000 prisoners), for Heinkel-Flugzeugwerke
5. Belzig (became a subcamp of Sachsenhausen in 1944), for Kopp and Co.
6. Berlin (over ten camps)
7. Born
8. Dabelow
9. Dahmshöhe
10. Dresden Universelle
11. Eberswalde
12. Feldberg (Mecklenburg)
13. Fürstenberg/Havel
14. Genthin (became a subcamp of Sachsenhausen in 1944)
15. Grüneberg (at Löwenberger Land; over 1,000 prisoners, up to 1,710) for Metall-Poltekonzern, Munitionsfabrik
16. Gut Hartzwalde
17. Hagenow
18. Hausham (became a subcamp of Dachau in 1944)
19. Helmbrechts (became a subcamp of Flossenbürg in 1944)
20. Hennigsdorf
21. Hohenlychen
22. Holýšov (became a subcamp of Flossenbürg)
23. Kalisz Pomorski
24. Karlshagen (over 1,000 prisoners)
25. Klützow
26. Königsberg in der Neumark (in Chojna) for Flughafen GmbH
27. Kraslice (became a subcamp of Flossenbürg in 1944)
28. Leipzig-Schönefeld (over 1,000 prisoners; became a subcamp of Buchenwald in 1944)
29. Magdeburg (over 1,000 prisoners; became a subcamp of Buchenwald in 1944)
30. Malchow (over 1,000 prisoners, up to 4,196)
31. Mildenburg
32. Munich, for Lebensborn e.V.
33. Neubrandenburg (over 1,000 prisoners, up to 4,343)
34. Neustadt-Glewe (over 1,000 prisoners, up to 4,220)
35. Nová Role (became a subcamp of Flossenbürg in 1944)
36. Peenemünde
37. Prenzlau
38. Rechlin
39. Retzow
40. Rostock, for Heinkel-Flugzeugwerke
41. Rostock-Marienehe
42. Rostock-Schwarzenforst
43. Sassnitz
44. Schlieben (became a subcamp of Buchenwald in 1944)
45. Schoenefeld, Krs. Teltow (later became a subcamp of Sachsenhausen)
46. Security Police School Drögen (was a subcamp of Sachsenhausen until 1942)
47. Stargard (in Stargard Szczeciński), for Gerätewerk Pommern GmbH
48. Steinhöring
49. Svatava (became a subcamp of Flossenbürg in 1944)
50. Uckermark
51. Velten (became a subcamp of Sachsenhausen in 1944)
52. Wiesbaden
53. Wolfen (became a subcamp of Buchenwald in 1944)
54. Zichow

== See also ==
- List of Nazi concentration camps
