= List of subcamps of Kauen =

From 1943, the SS operated 17 subcamps of the Kauen concentration camp. With the advance of the Red Army, while some of the earlier nine concentration camp subcamps continued in use, eight of the Kauen subcamps were closed in July 1944.

In approximate order of date of starting, these were:

#	German name	Lithuanian name	From	To	Description
1	Schaulen	Šiauliai	March 1943		Airfield. Supported as an external command of the Schaulen concentration camp subcamp (ghetto)
2		Akmenė			Jewish forced labor camp, chalk factory.
3	Vilna	Lukiškės Gestapo prison			Used by the Gestapo and Lithuanian Saugumas as a holding cell for thousands of Jews from the Vilna Ghetto.
4	Vilna	Kailis fur factory	September 16, 1943	July 3, 1944	1000 to 1500 Jewish workers, most were shot in Aukštieji Paneriai.
5	Vilna	Army Vehicle Fleet 562	September 17, 1943	July 1944	From November this was an official concentration camp subcamp of the Kauen concentration camp. It was liquidated in July 1944 when around 500 concentration camp prisoners, and more, were brought to Aukštieji Paneriai to be murdered and shot - only around 250 survived. The camp was on Subocz Street, where a monument to the concentration camp subcamp has stood since 1993.
6	Vilna	Vilnius	September 1943	July 1944	Hospital. About 80 Jews worked here until the shootings in Aukštieji Paneriai and Ninth Fort in July 1944.
7		Daugeliai	September 27, 1943	Mid-July 1944	Jewish forced labor camp, brick factory. Liquidated when prisoners were deported to the Stutthof concentration camp. Around 250 men from the Schaulen concentration camp subcamp worked here.
8	Kauen-Petraschunai	Kaunas-Petrašiūnai			
9	Linkaich	Linkaičiai	End of September 1943	Mid-July 1944	Survivors deported to the Stutthof concentration. About 80 Jewish men and women.
10	Kauen-Alexoten	Kaunas-Aleksotas	November 30, 1943	July 12, 1944	Male prisoners were deployed at Schichau-Werke, Elbing to work in the anti-aircraft repair workshop.
11	Kauen-Schanzen	Kaunas-Šančiai	December 16, 1943	July 12, 1944	Deployment of female prisoners at the Army Catering Office Magazine, the Army Clothing Office, the Army Motor Vehicle Park, the Army Construction Site, at the Kauen Motor Post Office and other locations.
12	Kazlu Ruda	Kazlų Rūda	1944	Summer 1944	Women working on peat; also a men's camp.
13	Kedahnen	Kėdainiai		July 1944	Work at the airfield
14	Koschedaren	Kaišiadorys	December 1943	July 1944	Work on peat and forest operations
15	Kauen-Palemonas	Kaunas-Palemonas	November to December 1943	July 7, 1944	Men's camp. Evacuated by ship to Germany.
16	Prawienisken	Pravieniškės	November 1943	May 15, 1944	Men's and one women's camp, forest work. Before that, there was a forced labor camp for Jews.
17	Schaulen	Šiauliai	September 18, 1943	July 1944	The Schaulen ghetto was transformed into a concentration camp subcamp. It was evacuated to the Stutthof concentration camp on July 15, 1944, from there to the Dachau concentration camp, Kaufering subcamp complex on July 21, 1944. A transport of women and children from Kauen and the Schaulen subcamp went from Stutthof to Auschwitz on July 26, 1944.
