= List of Nazi extermination camps and euthanasia centers =

Nazi Germany murdered its victims at a wide variety of sites, including vehicles, houses, hospitals, fields, concentration camps and purpose-built extermination camps. The six major extermination camps and eight major euthanasia extermination centers are listed here.

== Extermination camps ==
During the Final Solution of the Holocaust, Nazi Germany created six extermination camps to carry out the systematic genocide of the Jews in German-occupied Europe. All the camps were located in the General Government area of German-occupied Poland, with the exception of Chelmno, which was located in the Reichsgau Wartheland of German-occupied Poland.

- Chelmno (December 1941 – July 1944). Located near Chełmno nad Nerem (German: Kulmhof), 48 km (30 mi) northwest of the city of Łódź.
- Belzec (March 1942 – June 1943). Located near the village of Bełżec, approximate 114 km (71 mi) southeast of Lublin. (Note: Belzec was also the name of a system of forced labor camps along the Bug river in 1940. The extermination camp was built on top of the ruins of the destroyed main labor camp.)
- Sobibor (May 1942 – November 1943). Located near the village of Sobibór, approximately 80 km (50 mi) east of Lublin.
- Treblinka (July 1942 – September 1943). Located near the village of Treblinka, approximately 80 kilometres (50 miles) northeast of Warsaw. (Note: Treblinka was also the site of a forced labor camp. The designation Treblinka I is used to denote the forced labor camp and Treblinka II is used to denote the extermination camp.)
- Majdanek (October 1942 – July 1944). Located just outside the city of Lublin. (Note: Majdanek is sometimes referred to as Lublin.) (Note: Majdanek operated as a concentration camp and transit camp from October 1941 – July 1944.)
- Auschwitz-Birkenau (February 1942 – November 1944). Located near the town of Oświęcim (German: Auschwitz), 50 kilometres (31 mi) west of Kraków. (Note: Auschwitz consisted of three main camps, commonly referred to as Auschwitz I (concentration camp), Auschwitz II or Auschwitz-Birkenau (extermination camp), and Auschwitz III or Auschwitz-Monowitz (IG Farben forced labor camp).)

== Euthanasia extermination centers ==
In the period leading to the Final Solution, Nazi Germany created eight major euthanasia extermination centers to carry out the systematic genocide of the disabled. Scholars have established a fundamental connection between the motivation, the practical experience and psychological preparation, and the technology used in the Nazi euthanasia centers as part of Aktion T4 and Action 14f13 and the extermination camps used in the Holocaust. The dates of operation are for the period the facility operated as a euthanasia killing center.

Germany

- Bernburg. Located in Saxony near Magdeburg. (Note: Bernberg was designed to replace Brandenburg.)
- Brandenburg. Located near Berlin.
- Grafeneck. Located in Gomadingen near Stuttgart.
- Hadamar. Located in Hessen near Frankfurt. (Note: Hadamar was designed to replace Grafeneck.)
- Sonnenstein. Located in Saxony near Dresden.

Austria

- Am Spiegelgrund. Located in Vienna.
- Gugging. Located just outside Vienna.
- Hartheim. Located near Linz.

== See also ==
- Babi Yar
- Encyclopedia of Camps and Ghettos, 1933–1945
- Fort VII
- Gas van
- The Holocaust in Poland
- List of Nazi concentration camps
- Nazi eugenics
- Nazi ghettos
- Operation Reinhard
- Racial policy of Nazi Germany
- Types of Nazi camps
- Wannsee Conference
