= München-Schwabing labor camp =

Subcamp of the Dachau concentration camp

The München-Schwabing labor camp was a subcamp of the Dachau concentration camp located in Upper Bavaria. München-Schwabing was the first where concentration camp prisoners were permanently used as a labor force outside the main concentration camp. Unlike most of the later subcamps which were constructed, organized, and managed by the SS Business Administration Main Office (WVHA) and the Dachau camp commandant, this subcamp's administration, and organization was in the hands of Eleonore Baur, also known as "Sister Pia". This subcamp was also smaller than most others, and is included here as a representative case for instances in which prisoners were used by individuals or small organizations.

== See also ==
- List of subcamps of Dachau

== Sources ==
- Encyclopedia of Camps and Ghettos, 1933–1945 (Center for Advanced Holocaust Studies, United States Holocaust Memorial Museum)
