= Subcamp =

Outlying Nazi detention center under the command of a main concentration camp

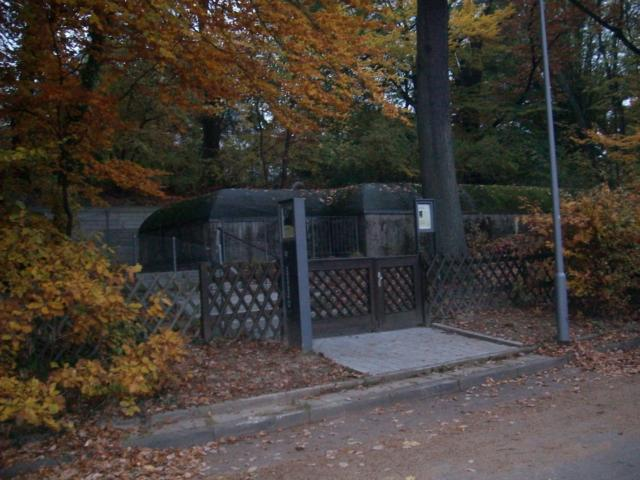
The Außenkommando "Unter den Eichen" in Wiesbaden was the site of a subcamp of the SS-Sonderlager Hinzert in which 100 political prisoners performed forced labor.

Subcamps (Note: also translated as satellite camps) were outlying detention centres (Haftstätten) that came under the command of a main concentration camp run by the SS in Nazi Germany and German-occupied Europe. The Nazis distinguished between the main camps (or Stammlager) and the subcamps (Außenlager or Außenkommandos) subordinated to them. Survival conditions in the subcamps were, in many cases, poorer for the prisoners than those in the main camps.

== Emergence of the concept ==
Within a concentration camp, prisoners were forced to carry out various tasks. The work could even be pointless and vexatious, without any useful output. Based on military language the SS designated such prisoner task forces as "details" or Kommandos; the generic term being the "works details" (Arbeitskommandos) of a camp.

For example, in Dachau concentration camp there was a "Crematorium Works Detail" (Arbeitskommando Krematorium), which was put together from a group of concentration camp prisoners; they were separately accommodated and were to have no contact with the other prisoners. Kommandos that were charged with forced labor were overseen by prisoner functionaries known as kapos.

Whether a prisoner was assigned to a physically easy or difficult Kommando affected their chances of survival. A Kommando assigned work that was inside a building, e.g. carrying out technical work, was more likely to survive than Kommandos who were made to work outside, in the open in winter, in freezing temperatures.

=== KZ Außenkommandos ===
Dachau was the first concentration camp that Reichsführer-SS Himmler had built. It was already in existence in 1933 and developed into a prototype for subsequent concentration camps such as Buchenwald, which was completed in 1937. But even Dachau concentration camp was not geographically restricted to Dachau. In addition to the Kommandos that had to be formed within the camp itself, were soon added Kommandos that worked outside the camp, for example the herb plantation detail (Kommando der Kräuterplantage) or the works details assigned to peat cutting. The SS increasingly deployed prisoners outside their concentration camp and made them build installations such as roads, ditches, barracks or SS recreation homes. Concentration camp prisoners were even used for the private purposes of senior Nazi officers: for Oswald Pohl's country house of Brüningsau, for Himmler's Hunting Lodge and also for the country house of Hans Loritz, the commandant of Dachau. Even Eleonore Baur, a nurse at the concentration camp and acquaintance of Hitler, was given her own Kommando.

Many of these works details were only established for weeks or months and their strength varied. Kommandos who stayed overnight, outside the concentration camp, were also called Außenkommandos.

In several cases Außenkommandos developed into new, independent concentration camps: Mauthausen concentration camp began in August 1938 with the arrival of the first prisoner details from Dachau. Niederhagen concentration camp was also formed from a KZ Außenkommando. Mittelbau-Dora concentration camp was initially a subcamp of Buchenwald and later became an independent concentration camp.

=== KZ Außenlager ===
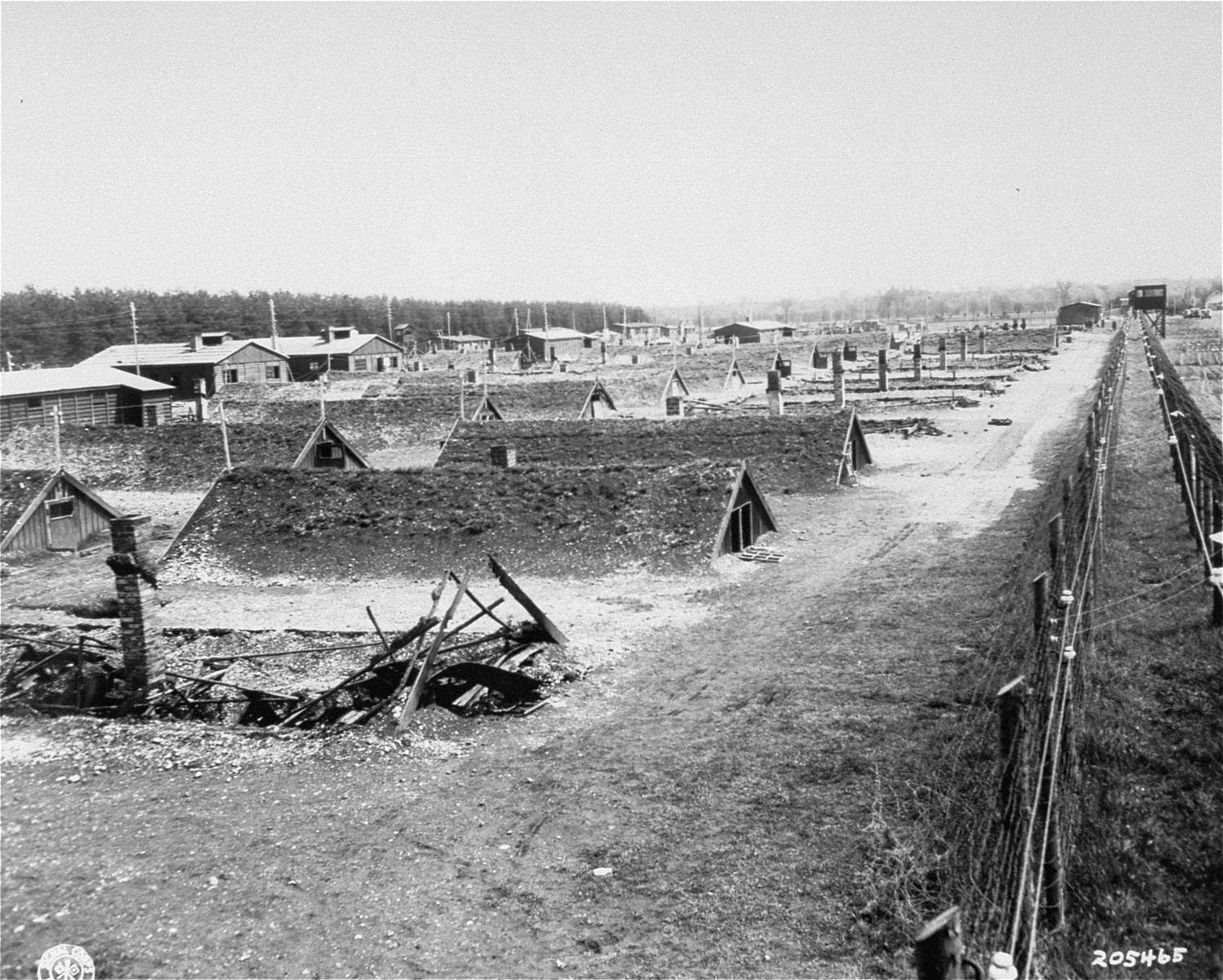
The earth huts in Kaufering concentration camp in which prisoners were housed

At the onset of war, the SS increasingly employed concentration camp prisoners in armaments factories. In some cases, the prisoners were accommodated in a hodge-podge of makeshift sleeping areas; in other cases, the SS forced them to erect the camp including the watchtowers and fences. Many such subcamps (KZ-Außenlager) were laid out in similar fashion to the concentration camps. There were also SS camp commanders (SS-Lagerführer) and prisoner functionaries such as the "camp senior" (Lagerältester) or "block senior" (Blockältester).

Today the camps are known as subcamps (in German either as KZ-Außenlager or Nebenlager). Sometimes the colloquial abbreviation "KZ" is used, but this can also refer to a main camp.

In the hierarchy of the Nazi camp system, subcamps were subordinated to a concentration camp that, for example, held the prisoner records and the death registers. Often the supply of food in subcamps was poorer than that of the main camp, quite apart from the condition of the sanitary facilities or sleeping arrangements for the prisoners. Since 1943, in Nazi documentation the Außenlager were often referred to as "Waffen-SS Work Camps" (Arbeitslager der Waffen-SS), especially in reference to subcamps that housed workforce for underground production facilities. The largest one of these was the Mittelbau-Dora concentration camp, a subcamp of Buchenwald, which itself spawned a large number of subcamps.

== Lists ==
The following articles list the subcamps under individual main camps of a particular concentration camp:

1. List of subcamps of Auschwitz
2. List of subcamps of Buchenwald
3. List of subcamps of Dachau
4. List of subcamps of Flossenbürg
5. List of subcamps of Gross-Rosen
6. List of subcamps of Hinzert
7. List of subcamps of Herzogenbusch
8. List of subcamps of Kraków-Płaszów
9. List of subcamps of Majdanek
10. List of subcamps of Mauthausen
11. List of subcamps of Mittelbau
12. List of subcamps of Natzweiler-Struthof
13. List of subcamps of Neuengamme
14. List of subcamps of Ravensbrück
15. List of subcamps of Sachsenhausen
16. List of subcamps of Stutthof

== Literature ==
- Wolfgang Benz, Barbara Distel (ed.): KZ-Außenlager. Geschichte und Erinnerung. In: Dachauer Hefte No. 15, Verlag Dachauer Hefte, 1999.
- Joanna Skibinska: Die letzten Zeugen. Gespräche mit Überlebenden des KZ-Außenlagers "Katzbach" in den Adlerwerken Frankfurt am Main. Hanau, 2005.
- Buggeln, Marc (2012). Das System der KZ-Außenlager: Krieg, Sklavenarbeit und Massengewalt (PDF). Gesprächskreis Geschichte. Vol. 95. Friedrich-Ebert-Stiftung. ISBN 978-3-86498-090-9.
