= List of subcamps of Majdanek =

The following is a list of subcamps of the Majdanek concentration camp run by Nazi Germany in occupied Poland during World War II. The list, supplied by the Majdanek State Museum, identifies two German categories of the KL Lublin/Majdanek subcamps; the Arbeitzlagers, and the so-called Kommandos. The satellite camps were named Aussenlager (external camp), Nebenlager (extension or subcamp), and Arbeitslager (labor camp). Some of them were less than ten kilometers away from the main camp, with prisoner populations ranging from several dozens to several thousand.

Around 1943 the SS put a number of separate camps under the command of the Majdanek administration including Trawniki, Krasnik, Pulawy and Poniatowa concentration camps. However, a similar plan to include the Kraków-Płaszów concentration camp in the list was never realized partly because of the Sobibor extermination camp uprising in the vicinity. Plaszow remained an independent Konzentrationslager associated with Auschwitz.

== Subcamps of Majdanek ==
Guarded by the SS division of the Totenkopfverbände, the known sub-camps of KL Majdanek included:

#.	Name	Location	Duration	Function	Prisoners	Firms
1.	DAW Lublin	Lublin: ul. Lipowa, ul. Chełmska; Puławy	1940–1944	Multipurpose	Yearly from 1,220 (1940) to 15,779 (1944)	Deutsche Ausruestungswerke (DAW)
2.	Arbeitslager Radom	Bliżyn, Radom	Since winter 1944	Workshops, factories	2,500 prisoners	Deutsche Ausruestungswerke (DAW)
3.	Arbeitzlager Blizyn	Bliżyn	From winter 1944	Quarry, workshops	Several thousand	Deutsche Ausruestungswerke (DAW), Ostidnustrie
4.	BKW Lublin	Lublin, ul. Chełmska	1941–1944	Textile works	Over 200 prisoners	Bekleidungswerke Dachau – Aussenstelle Lublin, Ostindustrie
5.	Bydzyn	Budzyń near Kraśnik	June 1944 – January 1945	Airplane parts	1,000 prisoners	Heinkel
6.	KL Warschau	Warszawa, ul. Gęsia	Since 1944	Work commandos for Ghetto demolition	Several thousand	Ostdeutsche Tiefbau, Berlinische Baugeselschaft.
Kommandos
7.	SS-Polizeiführerkommando Sportsplatz	Lublin (Wieniawa), ul. Ogródkowa	Spring 1942 – Spring 1944	Ghetto demolition	Approx. 120–600 prisoners	Schutzstaffel (SS)
8.	Standorterwaltungskommando	Lublin	1942–1943	Forced labour at SS garrison	Up to a hundred	Schutzstaffel (SS)
9.	Trawniki	Trawniki	Jesień 1942	Bridge construction	50 skilled workers	/-/
10.	Sägewerkkommando Piaski	Piaski k. Lublina	1943	Lumber mill	Dozens	SS
11.	Kommando	Chełm	1944	SS Wiking	Two dozen	SS

== See also ==
- Trawniki concentration camp
- Poniatowa concentration camp
- History of the Lublin Airport
- Lipowa camp of the Lublin Ghetto
- Subcamp (SS)
