= Eleonore Baur =

German Nazi official, only known female participant in Beer Hall Putsch

- Born: Eleonore Mayr; 7 September 1885; Bad Aibling, Kingdom of Bavaria, German Empire
- Died: 18 May 1981 (aged 95); Oberhaching, Bavaria, West Germany
- Other name: "Sister Pia"
- Occupation: Nurse
- Known for: Female bearer of the Blood Order, war crimes

Eleonore Baur (7 September 1885 – 18 May 1981), also known as "Sister Pia", was an early member of the Nazi Party and the only woman known to have participated in the Munich Beer Hall Putsch.

== Early life ==
What little is known about her life up to 1919 is based on her own testimonies in court hearings.

Eleonore Mayr was born in Bad Aibling, Bavaria. Mayr's mother died shortly after her birth and her father remarried. When she was five, Mayr moved to Munich with her father and her stepmother, who treated her badly. When she was still a child, she had to work hard. In Munich, Mayr left school aged 14 to work as a handmaid for a midwife. At 19 she gave birth to an illegitimate son named Wilhelm, whom she gave to her stepmother in order to raise him.

In 1905, Mayr moved together with a nurse friend to Cairo where she was trained as a nurse. She returned to Munich in 1907, and first worked as a private nurse, then for the "Gelbes Kreuz", an association of free nurses. According to Baur, the nurse in charge named her "Sister Pia", probably to give the impression that they were a ministry like the deaconesses or religious sisters.

In 1908 or 1909 Eleonore Mayr married Ludwig Baur, a mechanical engineer. The marriage ended in divorce after five or six years. Baur served as a nurse during World War I and then assisted the Freikorps Oberland troops during their battle against the Bavarian Soviet Republic and in the Baltic campaign in 1919. In 1923 she married for the second time, a hotel manager named Sponseil ten years her junior. This marriage also ended in divorce.

== Political career ==
In 1919, Baur met Adolf Hitler and Anton Drexler, at that time civilians, on a tramway in Munich. Drexler helped her out with the fare, since she had no money with her. Through this incident Baur came into contact with "the movement", from then on she attended meetings in the Sterneckerbräu and was soon one of the first members of the DAP and thus the NSDAP (membership number 506). However, in 1923, she apparently left the NSDAP or was expelled from it because she had not paid membership fees.

Baur became one of the most visible Nazi figures in Munich in the spring of 1920, and was arrested on 11 March 1920 for "Incitement to class hatred" following a demonstration at a women's rally in Munich, where she injected the women should not insult the police, but rather focus on those who were to blame for all the misfortunes, namely the Jews. Her subsequent acquittal made her a hero of the Nazi movement.

Baur continued to be active in German politics, giving speeches and organising Nazi-based charitable events. She took part as a medic in the battles of the Oberland Freikorps in Silesia and was wounded during the storming of the Annaberg on May 21, 1921.

She was the only woman known to have participated in the Beer Hall Putsch on 9 November 1923, during which she received minor injuries. For this she later received the so-called "Blood Order", being one of only two German and 14 Austrian women to be awarded the party's highest decoration.

After the failed coup on November 9, 1923, she stayed away from politics for ten years. Throughout the rise of the Nazis and following their Machtergreifung in 1933, Baur remained close to the Nazi leadership (accompanying Hitler on picnic trips).

In 1934, Eleonore Baur was employed by Heinrich Himmler as a welfare nurse in the Reich Command of the SS, with the privileges of an SS Oberführer. Himmler entrusted her with the task of caring for sick SS men and their relatives. This brought her to the hospital nearby the Dachau concentration camp. She was present several times when SS doctor Sigmund Rascher carried out barometric pressure experiments on some of the camp's inmates.

She was promoted under the Nazi regime as the ideal Nazi woman (Der Spiegel called her "the nurse of the Nazi nation") and her role in the nascent Nazi party was well known. Repeatedly she boasted: "There is only one Frederick the Great, there is only one Adolf Hitler, and there is only one Sister Pia." Known as a fanatical Nazi who hated Jews and Poles, Baur received a number of medals, including the Silesian Eagle Order, the Blood order, the Silver Medal for Bravery, and the Baltic cross.

Baur played a role in the construction and administration of Dachau and, while there is no evidence Baur physically harmed prisoners, she was accused of bullying prisoners, staff and neighbours. Two former prisoners died inexplicably. She was forcing prisoners to work on the renovations of the villa Hitler had given her in Oberhaching. The only woman allowed in Dachau, she had her own work squad of two to four prisoners and had a garage, a shed, a bathhouse and a bunker built. This squad was suspended in 1942 or, according to some witnesses, only in 1944.

Baur gained a reputation in the camp as someone who "requisitioned anything that was not nailed down". From a small nearby camp, München-Schwabing, groups of prisoners were "reportedly whipped and ordered to do manual labour" at Baur's home, including "cleaning her house, tending her garden and even building children’s toys".

== Post-war trial ==
Baur was first arrested on war crimes charges in May 1945 but shortly thereafter released due to insufficient evidence. However, the Americans re-arrested her in July 1945. In August 1949, an investigation was initiated against her for aiding and abetting murder. Regardless of this, a second charge was brought against them under the “Law for Liberation from National Socialism and Militarism” as part of the denazification process. Baur then appeared before a denazification court in Munich in September 1949.

The witnesses' testimonies about Baur in the trial were somewhat contradictory. While the majority of witnesses described her character as unpredictable, moody and hysterical, some, on the other hand, called her "our angel in hopeless hours" and "a rare noble and kind woman". She is said to have intervened several times when prisoners were being mistreated. In 1943 she was temporarily banned from camp because she allegedly wanted to smuggle letters from prisoners out of the concentration camp. At Christmas she made little presents to political prisoners, which they even called "Pia-Packerl."

By the court, Baur was categorised as a major criminal, sentenced to ten years at Rebdorf labour camp, which was the harshest punishment in the denazification law, as well as the loss of her civil rights and had her personal property confiscated, except for a remaining amount of 1,000 DM.

She appealed and the court reduced the sentence to eight years in 1951. However, she had been already released from prison in 1950 for health reasons. Investigations by the Munich public prosecutor's office were discontinued due to a lack of evidence.

Baur applied for a pension and compensation in 1955 (from the files it is unclear whether this was granted). However, she regained her villa in Oberhaching, where she died aged 95 in 1981. Until her death she was in contact with other National Socialists.
