= Kauen concentration camp =

Nazi concentration camp

Coordinates: 54°54′57″N 23°53′18″E

External images
- Picture of a workshop by George Kadish
- Mass grave at the Ninth Fort, where many prisoners were executed, photograph also by Kadish

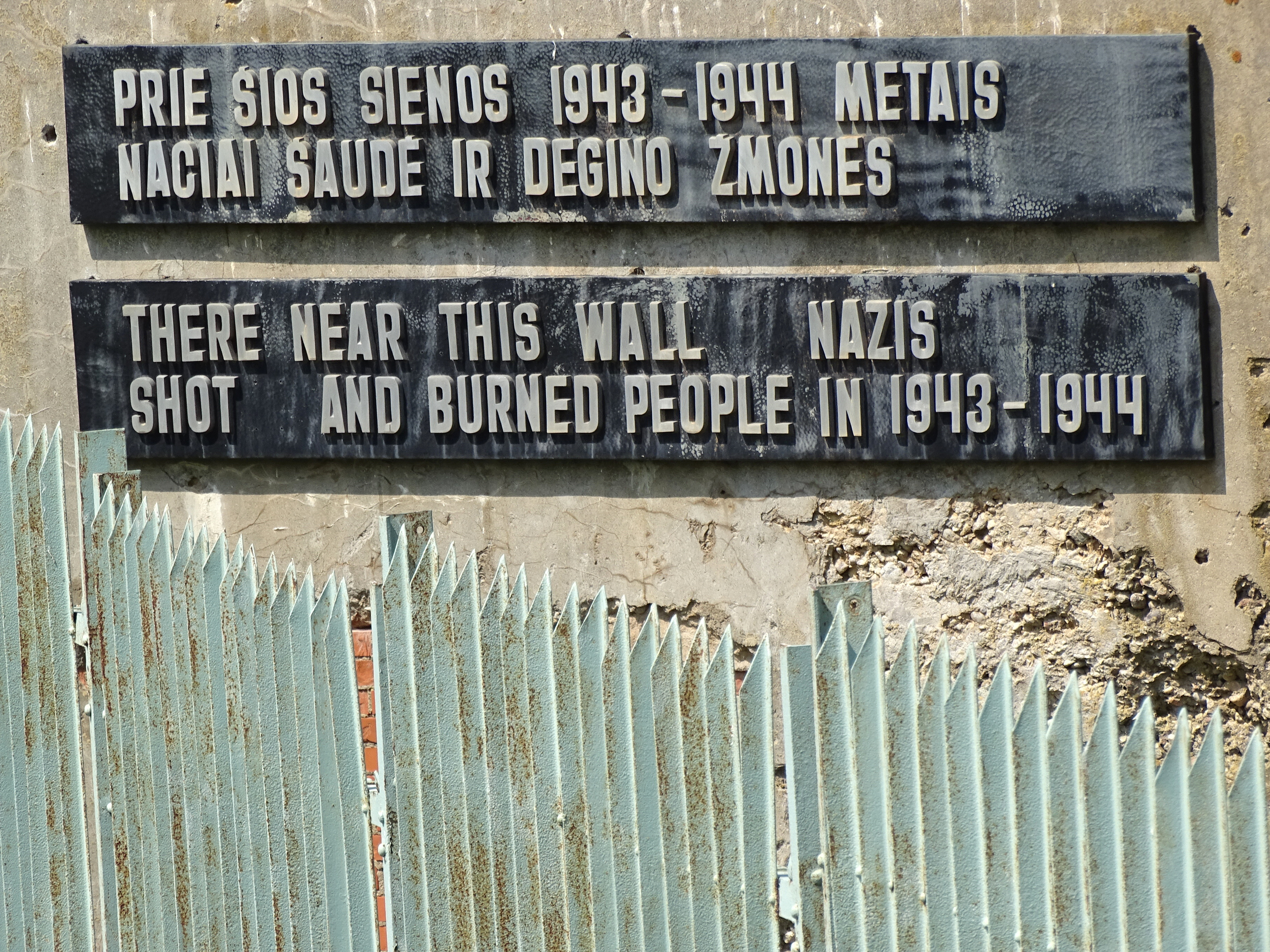
Commemorative plaque at the Ninth Fort

Kauen (German: Konzentrationslager (KZ) Kauen, Lithuanian: Kauno koncentracijos stovykla) was a Nazi Germany concentration camp located in the former Kovno Ghetto, modern day Lithuania. It operated from 15 September 1943 to 14 July 1944 and had seventeen satellite camps located around the city of Kaunas, in modern-day Lithuania. Most prisoners were Jews who had survived the previous years of the Holocaust in Lithuania. In July 1944, eight of the subcamps were closed. The main camp was liberated by the Red Army on 1 August 1944.

== Sources ==
- Evelyn Zegenhagen, Charles-Claude Biedermann: Early Camps, Youth Camps, and Concentration Camps and Subcamps under the SS-Business Administration Main Office (WVHA) . Encyclopedia. In: United States Holocaust Memorial Museum (ed.): Encyclopedia of Camps and Ghettos, 1933–1945. Indiana University Press, Bloomington, USA 2009, ISBN 978-0-253-35328-3, "Kauen" pp. 848–852
- Riga-Kaiserwald, Warschau, Vaivara, Kauen (Kaunas), Płaszów, Kulmhof. (tr. "Riga Imperial Forest, Warsaw, Vaivara, Kaunas (Kaunas), Płaszów, Kulmhof") In: Wolfgang Benz, Barbara Distel (Hrsg.): Der Ort des Terrors. (tr. "The place of terror") vol. 8, "Kaunas". C. H. Beck, Munich 2005, ISBN 978-3-406-57237-1, p. 209–232
