= Missler concentration camp =

Concentration camp in Nazi Germany

Coordinates: 53.0935°N 8.8025°E

Missler concentration camp, also known as KZ Mißler in German, was an early concentration camp operating in Nazi Germany.

The concentration camp was set up at the end of March 1933. Under orders of SS-Hauptsturmführer Otto Löblich, 148 prisoners, of which most were persecuted communists, were to be held in "protective custody". Later on the occupancy of the camp was raised to 300. The camp was located in a residential area in Bremen, which made it nearly impossible to shut out spectators, thus the police senator decided to dissolve the camp in July 1933. It wasn't until September 1933 that all the prisoners had been transferred to another camp.

The Missler concentration camp was destroyed during World War II and all that's left of it are two plaques which remind of the concentration camp.
