= Extermination camp =

Nazi death camps established to systematically murder

Nazi Germany extermination camps
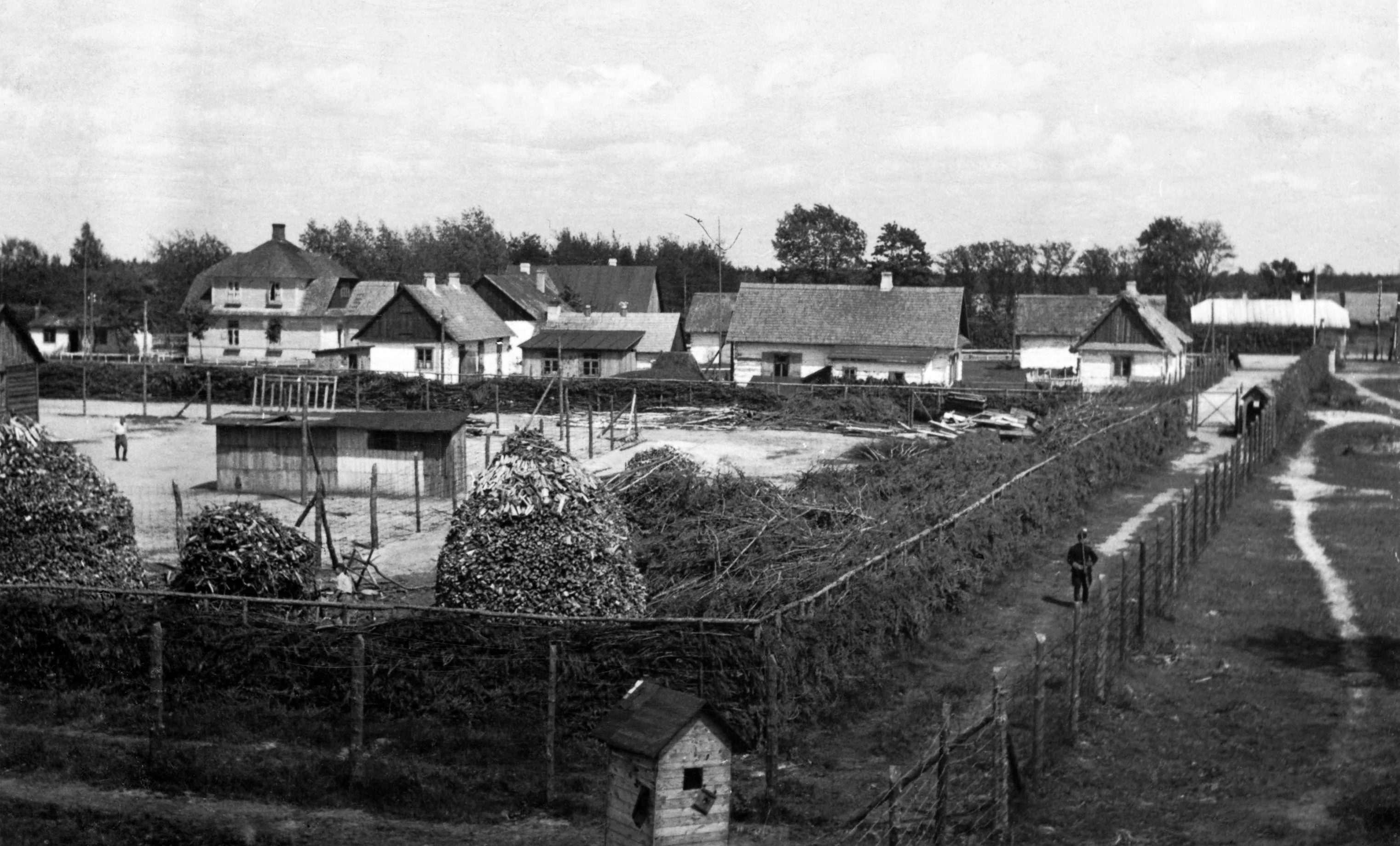
- View of Sobibor extermination camp, 1943 The Holocaust map: The six Nazi extermination camps set up by the SS in occupied Poland, are marked with white skulls in black squares.
- Location: German-occupied Europe (chiefly occupied Poland)
- Date: World War II
- Incident type: Extermination
- Perpetrators: The SS
- Organizations: SS-Totenkopfverbände
- Camp: Chełmno, Bełżec, Sobibór, Treblinka, Auschwitz-Birkenau, Majdanek, Maly Trostenets

Nazi Germany used six extermination camps (German: Vernichtungslager), also called death camps (Todeslager), or killing centers (Tötungszentren), in Central Europe, primarily in German-occupied Poland, during World War II to systematically murder over 2.7 million people—mainly Jews—in the Holocaust. The victims of death camps were primarily murdered by gassing, either in permanent installations constructed for this specific purpose, or by means of gas vans. The six extermination camps were Chełmno, Bełżec, Sobibor, Treblinka, Majdanek and Auschwitz-Birkenau. Extermination through labour was also used at the Auschwitz and Majdanek death camps. Millions were also murdered in concentration camps, in the Aktion T4, or directly on site. Additionally, camps operated by Nazi allies have also been described as extermination or death camps, most notably the Jasenovac concentration camp in the Independent State of Croatia.

The National Socialists made no secret of the existence of concentration camps as early as 1933, as they served as a deterrent to resistance. The extermination camps, on the other hand, were kept strictly secret. To disguise the mass murder, even in internal correspondence, they only referred to it as "special treatment," "cleansing," "resettlement," or "evacuation." The SS referred to the extermination camps as concentration camps. Their internal organizational structures were also largely identical. The term "extermination camp" was only used later in historical scholarship and in court cases and serves to further categorize the camps.

The idea of mass extermination with the use of stationary facilities, to which the victims were taken by train, was the result of earlier Nazi experimentation with chemically manufactured poison gas during the secretive Aktion T4 euthanasia programme against hospital patients with mental and physical disabilities. The technology was adapted, expanded, and applied in wartime to unsuspecting victims of many ethnic and national groups; the Jews were the primary target, accounting for over 90 percent of extermination camp victims. The genocide of the Jews of Europe was Nazi Germany's "Final Solution to the Jewish question".

== Background ==
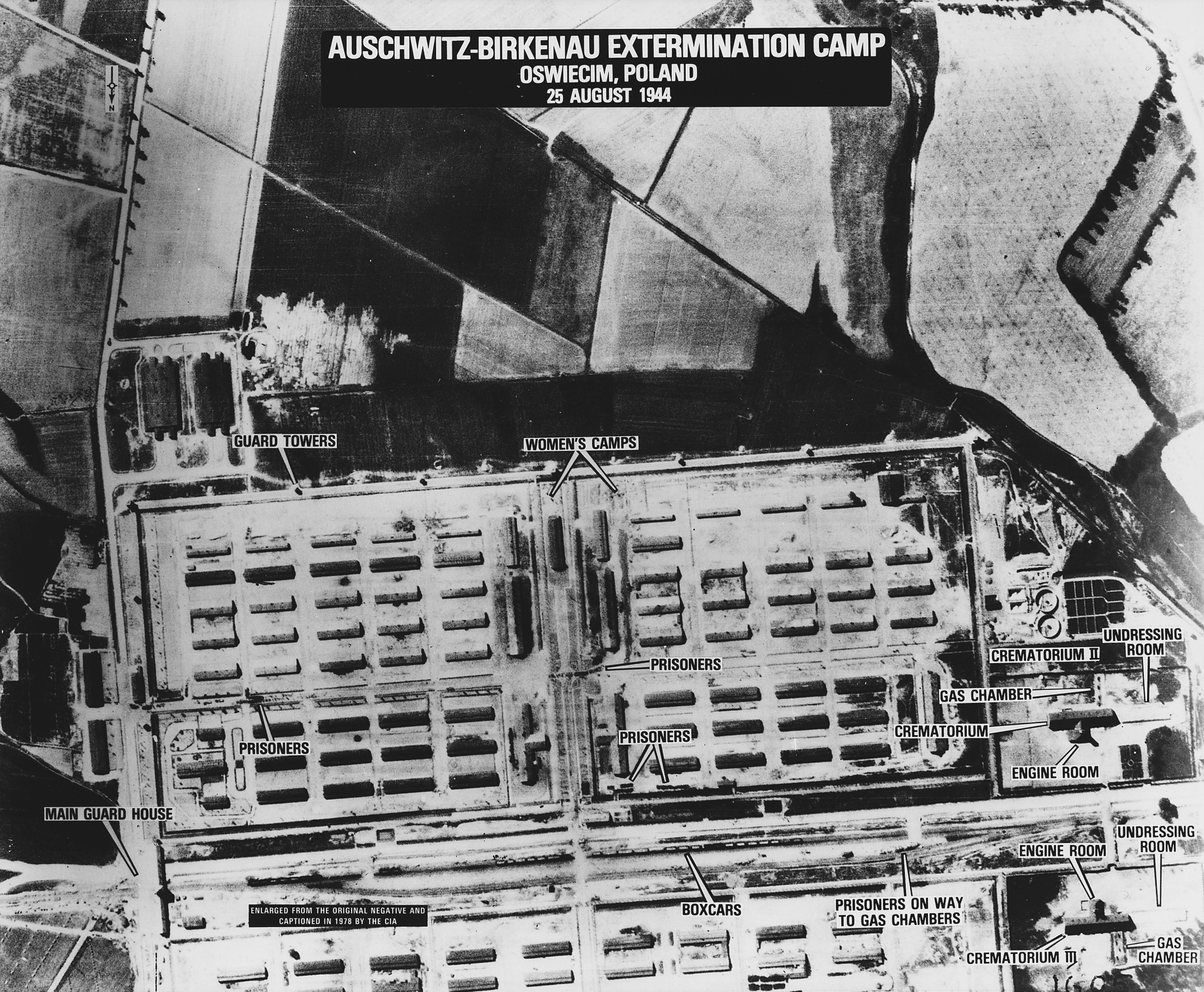

1 / Crematorium II	2 / Crematorium III

Two of the four crematoria at Auschwitz II (Birkenau)

After the invasion of Poland in September 1939, the secret Aktion T4 euthanasia programme – the systematic murder of German, Austrian and Polish hospital patients with mental or physical disabilities authorized by Hitler – was initiated by the SS in order to eliminate "life unworthy of life" (German: Lebensunwertes Leben), a Nazi designation for people who they considered to have no right to life. In 1941, the experience gained in the secretive killing of these hospital patients led to the creation of extermination camps for the implementation of the Final Solution. By then, the Jews were already confined to new ghettos and interned in Nazi concentration camps along with other targeted groups, including Roma, and the Soviet POWs. The Nazi's so-called "Final Solution of the Jewish Question", based on the systematic murder of Europe's Jews by gassing, began during Operation Reinhard, after the June 1941 onset of the Nazi–Soviet war. The adoption of the gassing technology by Nazi Germany was preceded by a wave of hands-on killings carried out by the SS Einsatzgruppen, who followed the Wehrmacht army during Operation Barbarossa on the Eastern Front. (Note: The development of homicidal gas chambers is attributed by historians to Albert Widmann, chief chemist of the German Criminal Police (Kripo). The first gas van manufactured in Berlin, was used by the Lange Commando between 21 May and 8 June 1940 at the Soldau concentration camp in occupied Poland, to kill 1,558 mental patients delivered from sanatoria. Lange used his experience with exhaust gasses in setting up the Chełmno extermination camp thereafter. Widmann conducted first gassing experiments in the East in September 1941 in Mogilev, and successfully initiated the killing of local hospital patients with the exhaust fumes from a truck engine, minimizing the psychological impact of the crime on the Einsatzgruppe.)

The camps designed specifically for the mass gassings of Jews were established in the months following the Wannsee Conference chaired by Reinhard Heydrich in January 1942 in which the principle was made clear that the Jews of Europe were to be exterminated. Responsibility for the logistics was to be handled by the programme administrator, Adolf Eichmann.

On 13 October 1941, the SS and Police Leader Odilo Globocnik stationed in Lublin received an oral order from Reichsführer-SS Heinrich Himmler – anticipating the fall of Moscow – to start immediate construction work on the killing centre at Bełżec in the General Government territory of occupied Poland. Notably, the order preceded the Wannsee Conference by three months, but the gassings at Chełmno north of Łódź using gas vans began already in December, under Sturmbannführer Herbert Lange. The camp at Bełżec was operational by March 1942, with leadership brought in from Germany under the guise of Organisation Todt (OT). By mid-1942, two more death camps had been built on Polish lands for Operation Reinhard: Sobibór (ready in May 1942) under the command of Hauptsturmführer Franz Stangl, and Treblinka (operational by July 1942) under Obersturmführer Irmfried Eberl from T4, the only doctor to have served in such a capacity. Auschwitz concentration camp was fitted with brand new gas chambers in March 1942. Majdanek had them built in September.

== Definition ==
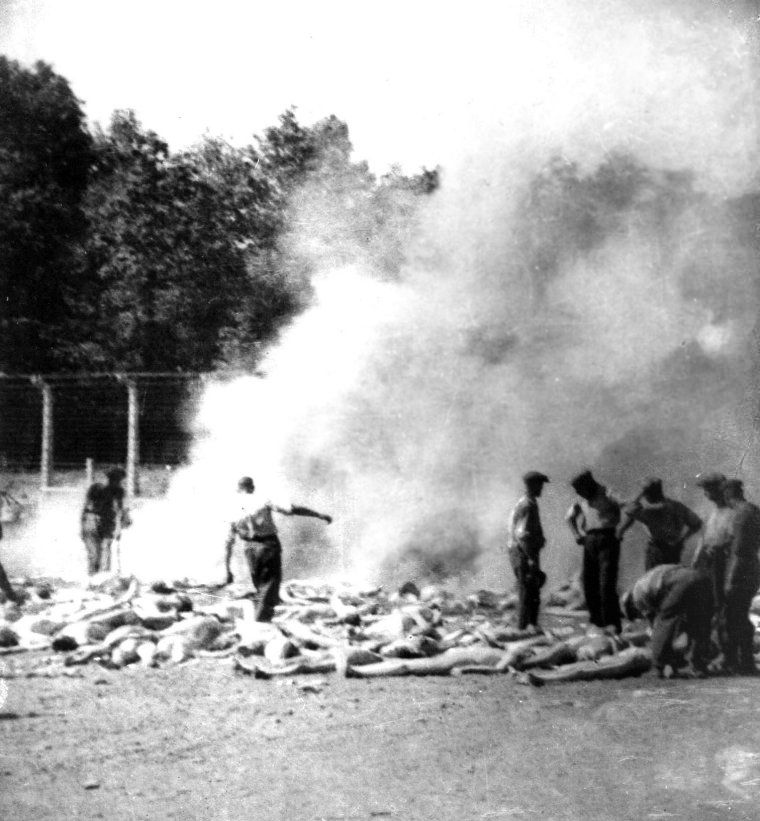
Members of the Sonderkommando burned the bodies of victims in the fire pits at Auschwitz II-Birkenau, when the crematoria were overloaded. (August 1944)

The Nazis distinguished between extermination and concentration camps. The terms extermination camp (Vernichtungslager) and death camp (Todeslager) were interchangeable in the Nazi system, each referring to camps whose primary function was genocide. Six camps meet this definition, though extermination of people happened at every sort of concentration camp or transit camp; the use of the term extermination camp with its exclusive purpose is carried over from Nazi terminology. The six camps were Chełmno, Belzec, Sobibor, Treblinka, Majdanek and Auschwitz (also called Auschwitz-Birkenau).

Death camps were designed specifically for the systematic killing of people delivered en masse by the Holocaust trains. Deportees were normally murdered within a few hours of arrival at Bełżec, Sobibór, and Treblinka. The Reinhard extermination camps were under Globocnik's direct command; each of them was run by 20 to 35 men from the SS-Totenkopfverbände branch of the Schutzstaffel, augmented by about one hundred Trawnikis – auxiliaries mostly from Soviet Ukraine, and up to one thousand Sonderkommando slave labourers each. The Jewish men, women and children were delivered from the ghettos for "special treatment" in an atmosphere of terror by uniformed police battalions from both Orpo and Schupo.

Death camps differed from concentration camps located in Germany proper, such as Bergen-Belsen, Oranienburg, Ravensbrück, and Sachsenhausen, which were prison camps set up prior to World War II for people defined as 'undesirable'. From March 1936, all Nazi concentration camps were managed by the SS-Totenkopfverbände (the Skull Units, SS-TV), who operated extermination camps from 1941 as well. An SS anatomist, Johann Kremer, after witnessing the gassing of victims at Birkenau, wrote in his diary on 2 September 1942: "Dante's Inferno seems to me almost a comedy compared to this. They don't call Auschwitz the camp of annihilation for nothing!" The distinction was evident during the Nuremberg trials, when Dieter Wisliceny (a deputy to Adolf Eichmann) was asked to name the extermination camps, and he identified Auschwitz and Majdanek as such. Then, when asked, "How do you classify the camps Mauthausen, Dachau, and Buchenwald?", he replied, "They were normal concentration camps, from the point of view of the department of Eichmann."

Murders were not limited to these camps. Sites for the "Holocaust by Bullets" are marked on the map of The Holocaust in Occupied Poland by white skulls (without the black background), where people were lined up next to a ravine and shot by soldiers with rifles. Sites included Bronna Góra, Ponary, Rumbula and others.

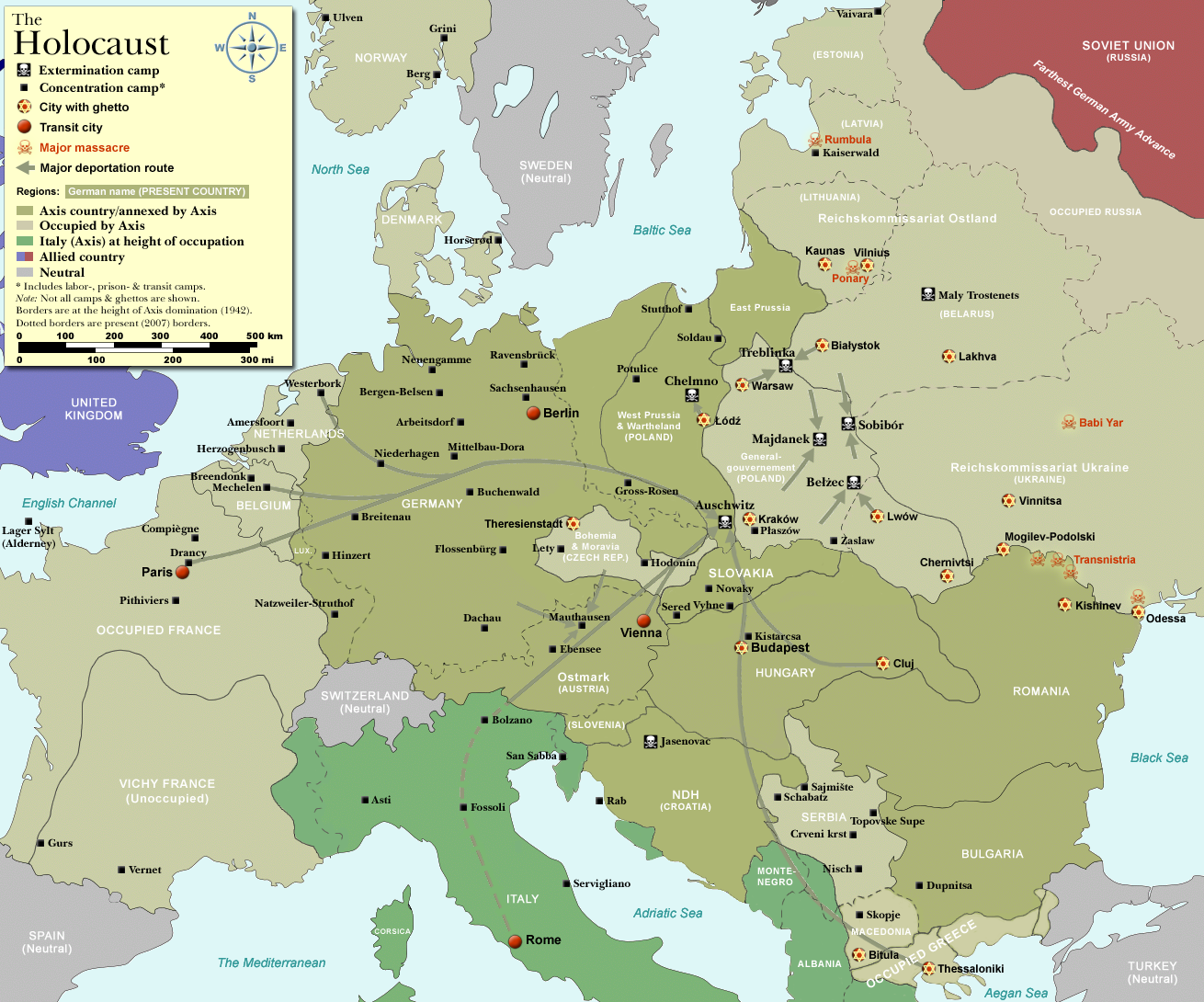
Mass deportations: the pan-European routes to the extermination camps

Irrespective of round-ups for extermination camps, the Nazis abducted millions of foreigners for slave labour in other types of camps, which provided perfect cover for the extermination programme. Prisoners represented about a quarter of the total workforce of the Reich, with mortality rates exceeding 75 percent due to starvation, disease, exhaustion, executions, and physical brutality.

== History ==
In the early years of World War II, the Jews were primarily sent to forced labour camps and ghettoised, but from 1942 onward they were deported to the extermination camps under the guise of "resettlement". For political and logistical reasons, the most infamous Nazi German killing factories were built in occupied Poland, where most of the intended victims lived; Poland had the greatest Jewish population in Nazi-controlled Europe. On top of that, the new death camps outside of Germany's prewar borders could be kept secret from the German civil populace.

=== Pure extermination camps ===
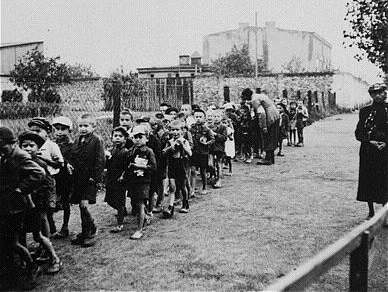
Jewish children during deportation to the Chełmno extermination camp

During the initial phase of the Final Solution, gas vans producing poisonous exhaust fumes were developed in the occupied Soviet Union (USSR) and at the Chełmno extermination camp in occupied Poland, before being used elsewhere. The killing method was based on experience gained by the SS during the secretive Aktion T4 programme of involuntary euthanasia. There were two types of death chambers operating during the Holocaust.

Unlike at Auschwitz, where cyanide-based Zyklon B was used to exterminate trainloads of prisoners under the guise of "relocation", the camps at Treblinka, Bełżec, and Sobibór, built during Operation Reinhard (October 1941 – November 1943), used lethal exhaust fumes produced by large internal combustion engines. The three killing centres of Einsatz Reinhard were constructed predominantly for the extermination of Poland's Jews trapped in the Nazi ghettos. At first, the victims' bodies were buried with the use of crawler excavators, but they were later exhumed and incinerated in open-air pyres to hide the evidence of genocide in what became known as Sonderaktion 1005.

The six camps considered to be purely for extermination were Chełmno extermination camp, Bełżec extermination camp, Sobibor extermination camp, Treblinka extermination camp, Majdanek extermination camp and Auschwitz extermination camp (also called Auschwitz-Birkenau).

Whereas the Auschwitz II (Auschwitz–Birkenau) and Majdanek camps were parts of a labor camp complex, the Chełmno and Operation Reinhard death camps (that is, Bełżec, Sobibór, and Treblinka) were built exclusively for the rapid extermination of entire communities of people (primarily Jews) within hours of their arrival. All were constructed near branch lines that linked to the Polish railway system, with staff members transferring between locations. These camps had almost identical design: they were several hundred metres in length and width, and were equipped with only minimal staff housing and support installations not meant for the victims crammed into the railway transports.

The Nazis deceived the victims upon their arrival, telling them that they were at a temporary transit stop, and would soon continue to German Arbeitslager (work camps) farther to the east. Selected able-bodied prisoners delivered to the death camps were not immediately killed, but instead were pressed into labor units called Sonderkommandos to help with the extermination process by removing corpses from the gas chambers and burning them.

=== Concentration and extermination camps ===
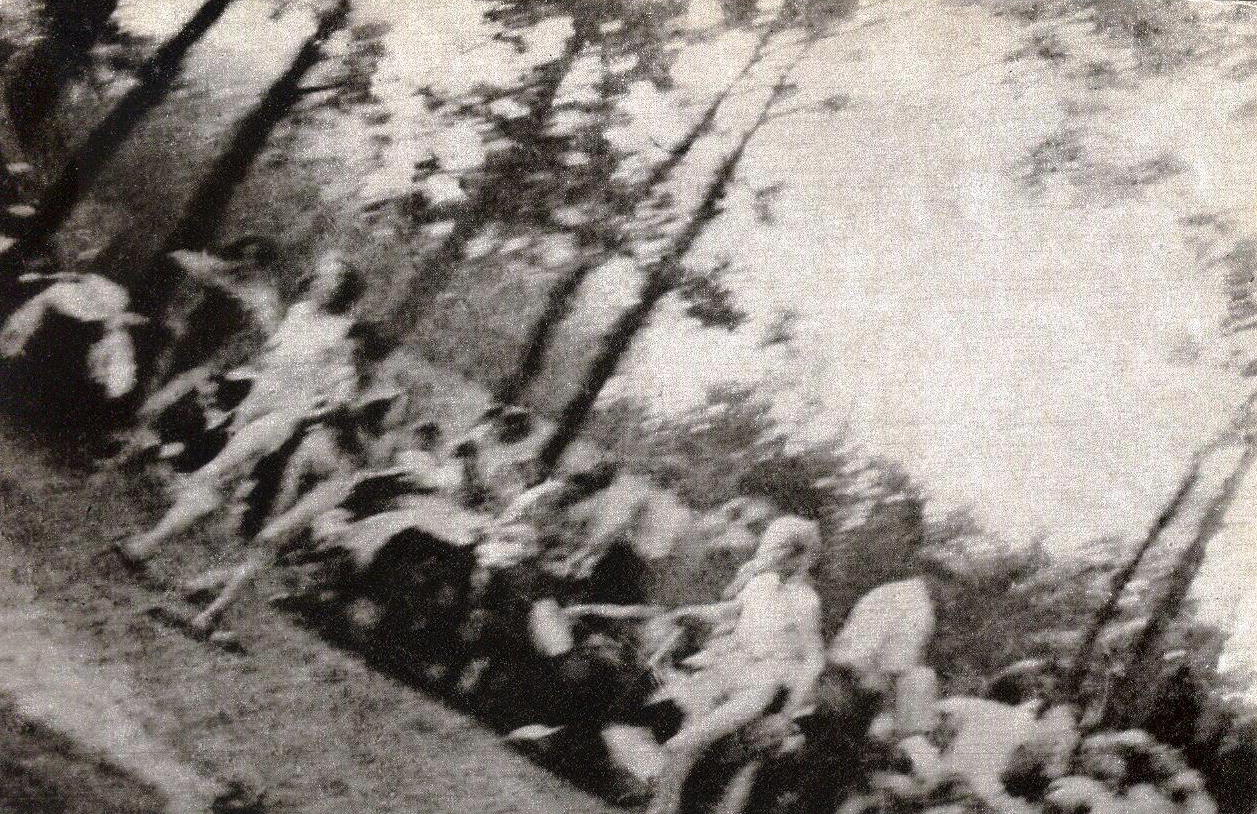
March to the gas chambers, one of the Sonderkommando photographs taken secretly at Auschwitz II in August 1944

At the camps of Operation Reinhard, including Bełżec, Sobibór, and Treblinka, trainloads of prisoners were murdered immediately after arrival in gas chambers designed exclusively for that purpose. The mass killing facilities were developed at about the same time inside the Auschwitz II-Birkenau subcamp of a forced labour complex, and at the Majdanek concentration camp. In most other camps prisoners were selected for slave labor first; they were kept alive on starvation rations and made available to work as required. Auschwitz, Majdanek, and Jasenovac were retrofitted with Zyklon B gas chambers and crematoria buildings as the time went on, remaining operational until war's end in 1945.

== Extermination procedure ==
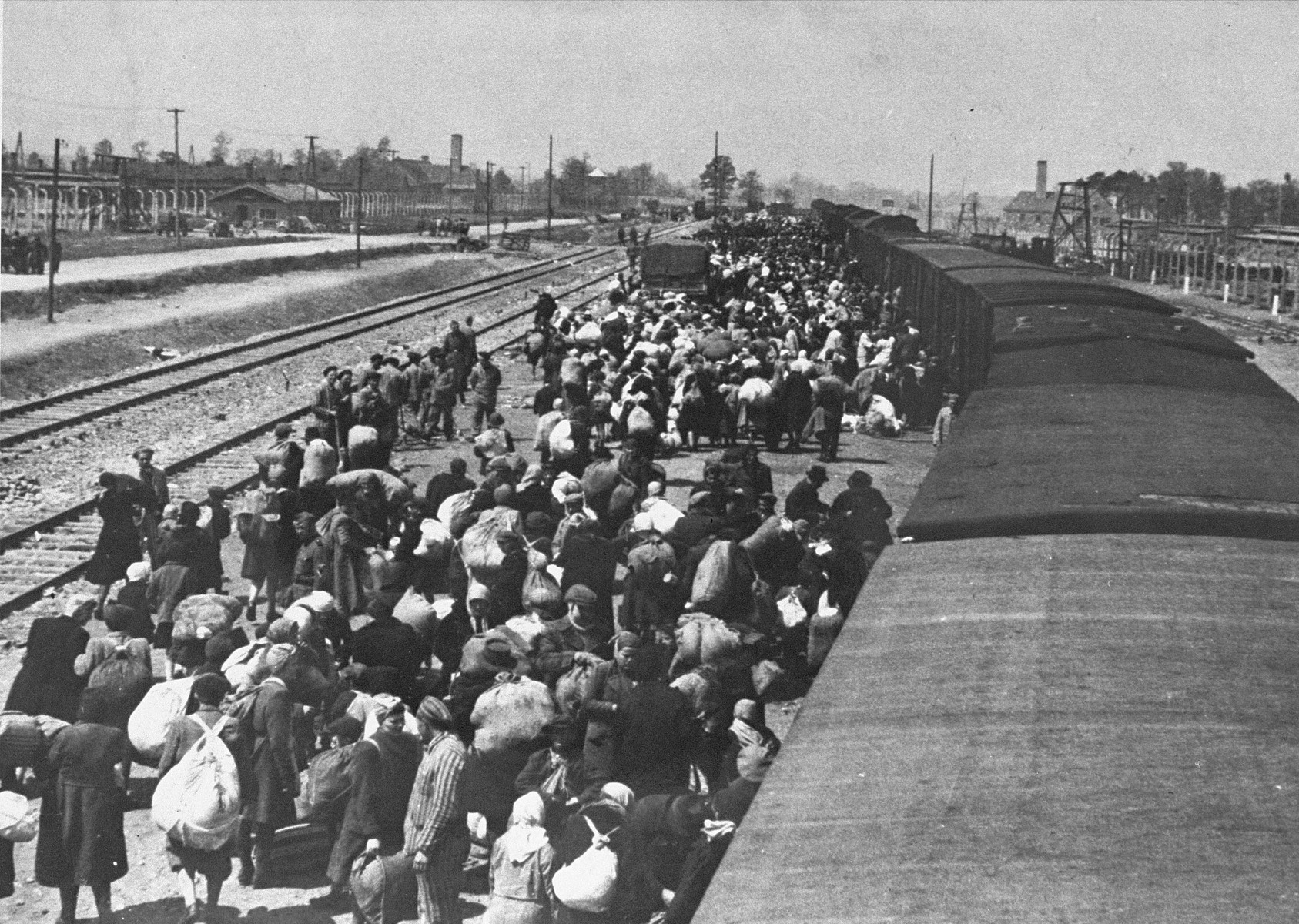
Carpathian Ruthenian Jews arrive at Auschwitz–Birkenau, May 1944. Without being registered to the camp system, most were killed in gas chambers hours after arriving. (Photograph from the Auschwitz Album)

Heinrich Himmler visited the outskirts of Minsk in 1941 to witness a mass shooting. He was told by the commanding officer there that the shootings were proving psychologically damaging to those being asked to pull the triggers. Thus, Himmler concluded that another method of mass killing was required. Auschwitz Commandant Rudolf Höss claimed in his memoir that many Einsatzkommandos were "unable to endure wading through blood any longer" and went mad or killed themselves, but he gives no specific numbers to support this claim.

The Nazis had first used gassing with carbon monoxide cylinders to murder 70,000 disabled people in Germany in what they called a 'euthanasia programme' to disguise that mass murder was taking place. Despite the lethal effects of carbon monoxide, this was seen as unsuitable for use in the East due to the cost of transporting the carbon monoxide in cylinders.

Each extermination camp operated differently, yet each had designs for quick and efficient industrialized killing. While Höss was away on an official journey in late August 1941 his deputy, Karl Fritzsch, tested out an idea. At Auschwitz clothes infested with lice were treated with crystallised prussic acid. The crystals were made to order by the IG Farben chemicals company for which the brand name was Zyklon B. Once released from their container, Zyklon B crystals in the air released a lethal cyanide gas. Fritzsch tried out the effect of Zyklon B on Soviet POWs, who were locked up in cells in the basement of the bunker for this experiment. Höss on his return was briefed and impressed with the results and this became the camp strategy for extermination as it was also to be at Majdanek. Besides gassing, the camp guards continued killing prisoners via mass shooting, starvation, torture, etc.

=== Gassings ===
SS Obersturmführer Kurt Gerstein of the Institute for Hygiene of the Waffen-SS, told a Swedish diplomat during the war, about life in a death camp. He recounted that on 19 August 1942, he arrived at Bełżec extermination camp (which was equipped with carbon monoxide gas chambers) and was shown the unloading of 45 train cars filled with 6,700 Jews, many already dead. The rest were marched naked to the gas chambers, where:

Unterscharführer Hackenholt was making great efforts to get the engine running. But it doesn't go. Captain Wirth comes up. I can see he is afraid, because I am present at a disaster. Yes, I see it all and I wait. My stopwatch showed it all, 50 minutes, 70 minutes, and the diesel [engine] did not start. The people wait inside the gas chambers. In vain. They can be heard weeping, "like in the synagogue", says Professor Pfannenstiel, his eyes glued to a window in the wooden door. Furious, Captain Wirth lashes the Ukrainian (Trawniki) assisting Hackenholt twelve, thirteen times, in the face. After 2 hours and 49 minutes – the stopwatch recorded it all – the diesel started. Up to that moment, the people shut up in those four crowded chambers were still alive, four times 750 persons, in four times 45 cubic meters. Another 25 minutes elapsed. Many were already dead, that could be seen through the small window, because an electric lamp inside lit up the chamber for a few moments. After 28 minutes, only a few were still alive. Finally, after 32 minutes, all were dead ... Dentists [then] hammered out gold teeth, bridges, and crowns. In the midst of them stood Captain Wirth. He was in his element, and, showing me a large can full of teeth, he said: "See, for yourself, the weight of that gold! It's only from yesterday, and the day before. You can't imagine what we find every day – dollars, diamonds, gold. You'll see for yourself!"

— Kurt Gerstein

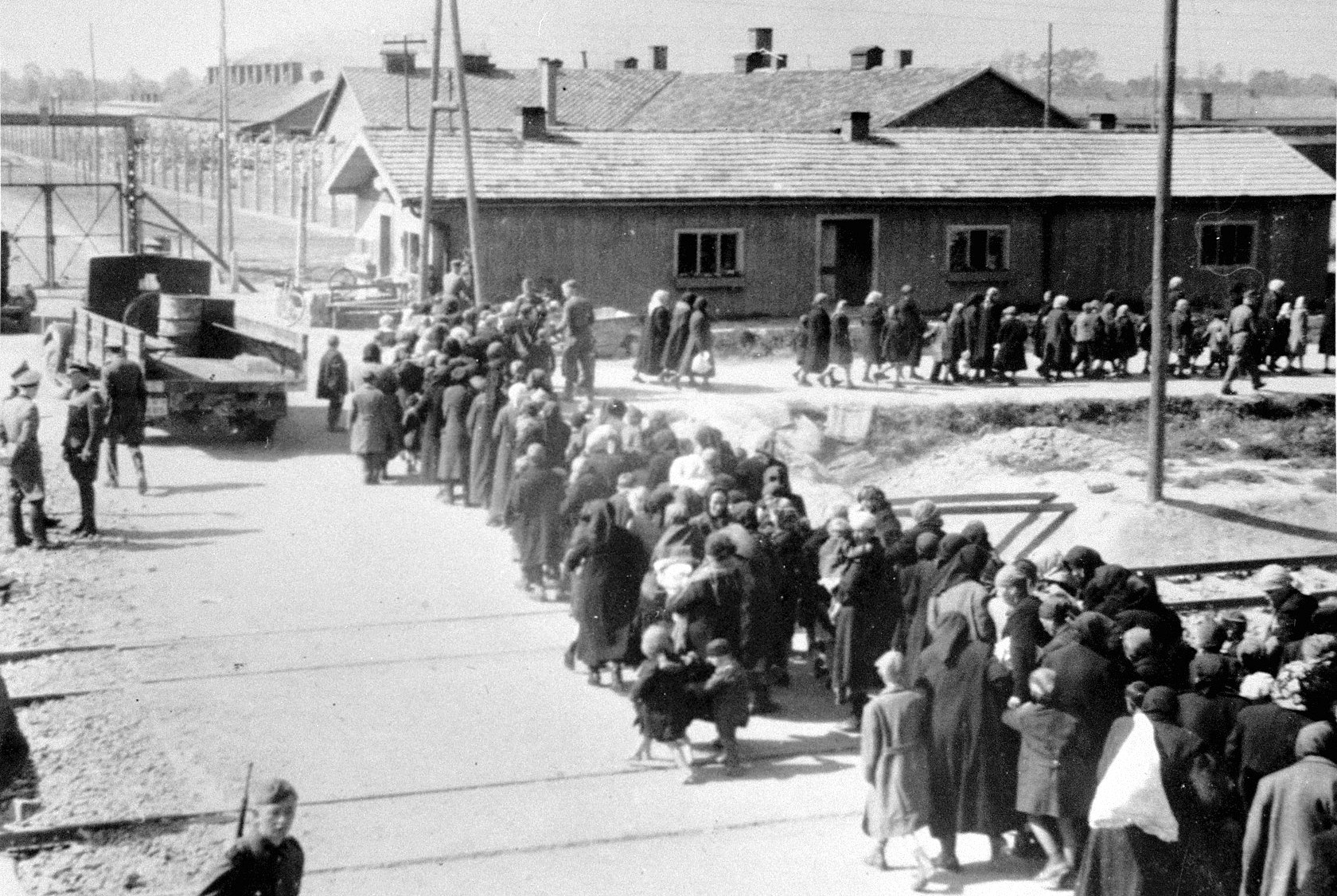
March of new arrivals along the SS barracks at Birkenau toward the gas chambers near crematoria II and III, 27 May 1944 (Photograph from the Auschwitz Album)

Auschwitz Camp Commandant Rudolf Höss reported that the first time Zyklon B pellets were used on the Jews, many suspected they were to be killed – despite having been deceived into believing they were to be deloused and then returned to the camp. As a result, the Nazis identified and isolated "difficult individuals" who might alert the prisoners, and removed them from the mass – lest they incite revolt among the deceived majority of prisoners en route to the gas chambers. The "difficult" prisoners were led to a site out of view to be killed off discreetly.

According to Höss, enslaved prisoners, euphemistically called Sonderkommando (Special Detachment), assisted in the process of extermination; they encouraged the Jews to undress and accompanied them into the gas chambers which were outfitted to appear as shower rooms (with nonworking water nozzles, and tile walls); and remained with the victims until just before the chamber door closed. To psychologically maintain the "calming effect" of the delousing deception, an SS man stood at the door until the end. The Sonderkommando talked to the victims about life in the camp to pacify the suspicious ones, and hurried them inside; to that effect, they also assisted the aged and the very young in undressing. Many young mothers hid their infants beneath their piled clothes fearing that the delousing "disinfectant" might harm them. Camp Commandant Höss reported that the "men of the Special Detachment were particularly on the look-out for this", and encouraged the women to take their children into the "shower room". Likewise, the Sonderkommando comforted older children who might cry "because of the strangeness of being undressed in this fashion".

Yet, not every prisoner was deceived by such tactics; Commandant Höss spoke of Jews "who either guessed, or knew, what awaited them, nevertheless ... [they] found the courage to joke with the children, to encourage them, despite the mortal terror visible in their own eyes". Some women would suddenly "give the most terrible shrieks while undressing, or tear their hair, or scream like maniacs"; these prisoners were taken away for execution by shooting. In such circumstances, others, meaning to save themselves at the gas chamber's threshold, betrayed the identities and "revealed the addresses of those members of their race still in hiding".

Once the door of the filled gas chamber was sealed, pellets of Zyklon B were dropped through special holes in the roof. Regulations required that the Camp Commandant supervise the preparations, the gassing (through a peephole), and the aftermath looting of the corpses. Commandant Höss reported that the gassed victims "showed no signs of convulsion"; the Auschwitz camp physicians attributed that to the "paralyzing effect on the lungs" of the Zyklon B gas, which killed before the victim began suffering convulsions. The corpses were additionally found half-squatting, their skin discolored pink with red and green spots, with some foaming at the mouth or bleeding from their ears, exacerbated by the crowding in gas chambers.

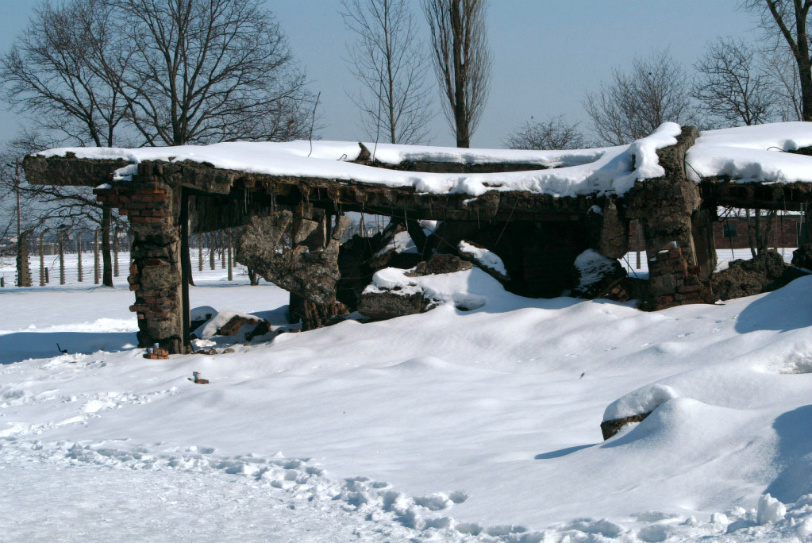
The remnants of "Crematorium II" used in Auschwitz-Birkenau between March 1943 and its destruction by the Schutzstaffel on 20 January 1945

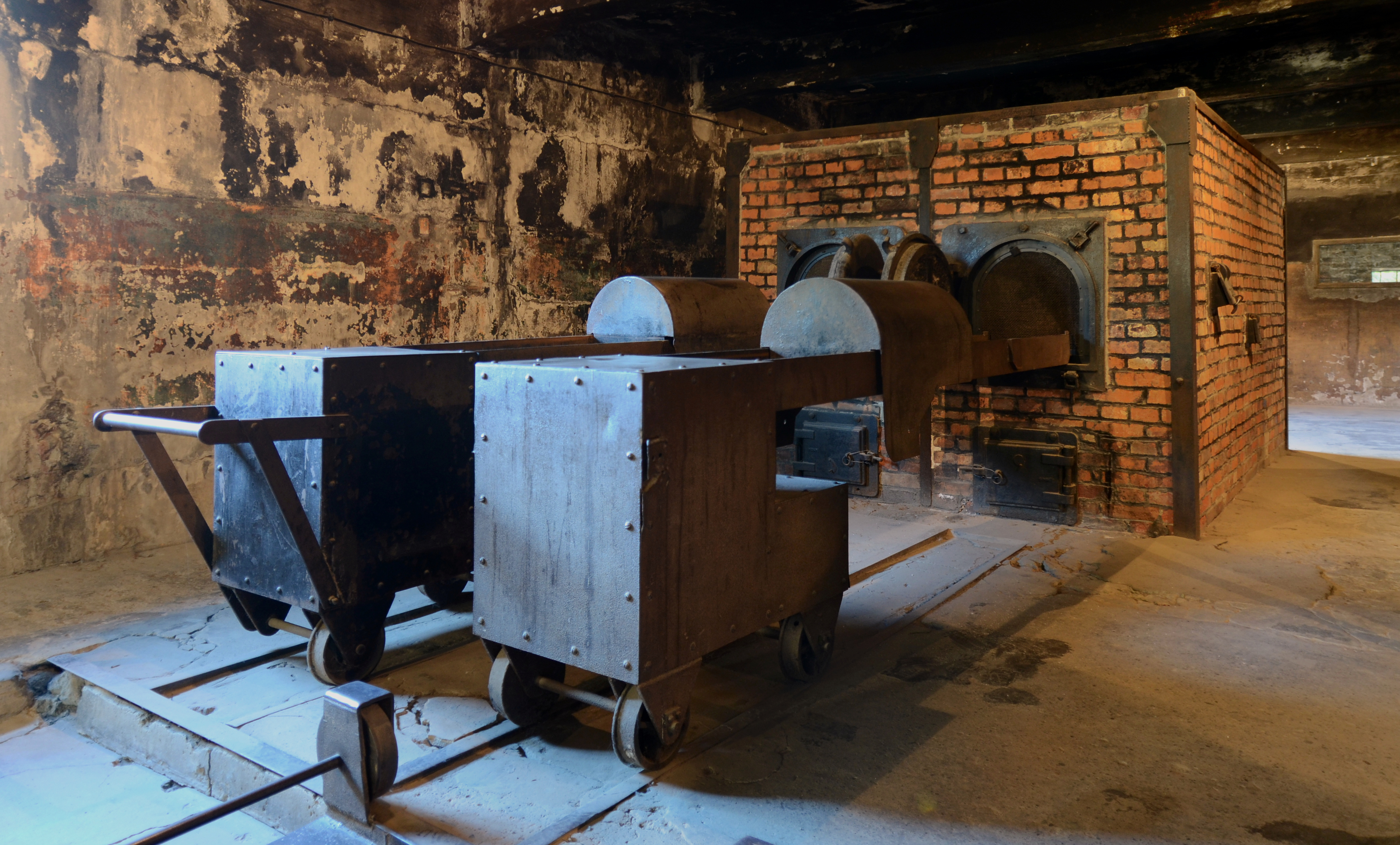
Fifty-two crematorium ovens, including these, were used to burn the bodies of up to 6,000 people every 24 hours during the operation of Auschwitz-Birkenau gas chambers.

As a matter of political training, some high-ranked Nazi Party leaders and SS officers were sent to Auschwitz–Birkenau to witness the gassings. As the Auschwitz Camp Commandant Rudolf Höss justified the extermination by explaining the need for "the iron determination with which we must carry out Hitler's orders".

=== Corpse disposal ===
After the gassings, the Sonderkommando removed the corpses from the gas chambers, then extracted any gold teeth. Initially, the victims were buried in mass graves, but were later cremated during Sonderaktion 1005 in all camps of Operation Reinhard.

The Sonderkommando was responsible for burning the corpses in the pits, stoking the fires, draining surplus body fat and turning over the "mountain of burning corpses ... so that the draft might fan the flames", wrote Commandant Höss in his memoir while in the Polish custody. He was impressed by the diligence of prisoners from the so-called Special Detachment who carried out their duties despite their being well aware that they, too, would meet exactly the same fate in the end. At the Lazaret killing station they held the sick so they would never see the gun while being shot. They did it "in such a matter-of-course manner that they might, themselves, have been the exterminators", wrote Höss. He further said that the men ate and smoked "even when engaged in the grisly job of burning corpses which had been lying for some time in mass graves." They occasionally encountered the corpse of a relative, or saw them entering the gas chambers. According to Höss, they were obviously shaken by this but "it never led to any incident". He mentioned the case of a Sonderkommando who found the body of his wife, yet continued to drag corpses along "as though nothing had happened".

At Auschwitz, the corpses were incinerated in crematoria and the ashes either buried, scattered, or dumped in the river. At Sobibór, Treblinka, Bełżec, and Chełmno, the corpses were incinerated on pyres. The efficiency of industrialised murder at Auschwitz-Birkenau led to the construction of three buildings with crematoria designed by specialists from the firm J. A. Topf & Söhne. They burned bodies 24 hours a day, and yet the death rate was at times so high that corpses also needed to be burned in open-air pits.

== Victims ==
The estimated total number of people who were murdered in the six Nazi extermination camps is 2.7 million Jews and an unknown number of others, including ethnic Poles and Roma, according to the United States Holocaust Memorial Museum. All six camps are located in present-day Poland.

Camp	Estimated deaths	Operational	Occupied territory	Nearest settlement	Primary means for mass killings
Auschwitz–Birkenau	1,100,000	May 1940 – January 1945	Province of Upper Silesia	Oświęcim	Zyklon B gas chambers
Treblinka	at least 800,000 (Note: The Höfle Telegram indicates some 700,000 killed by 31 December 1942, yet the camp functioned until 1943, hence the true death total likely is greater.) (Note: According to USHMM, "From late July 1942 through September 1943, the camp personnel murdered an estimated 925,000 Jews at the Treblinka killing center. They also killed an unknown number of Poles, Roma, and Soviet POWs.")	23 July 1942 – 19 October 1943	General Government district	Treblinka	Carbon monoxide gas chambers
Bełżec	at least 434,500	17 March 1942 – end of June 1943	General Government district	Bełżec	Carbon monoxide gas chambers
Chełmno	at least 156,300	8 December 1941 – March 1943, June 1944 – 18 January 1945	District of Reichsgau Wartheland	Chełmno nad Nerem	Carbon monoxide vans
Sobibór	at least 167,000	16 May 1942 – 17 October 1943	General Government district	Sobibór	Carbon monoxide gas chambers
Majdanek	at least 80,000	1 October 1941 – 22 July 1944	General Government district	Lublin	Zyklon B gas chambers

== Dismantling and attempted concealment ==
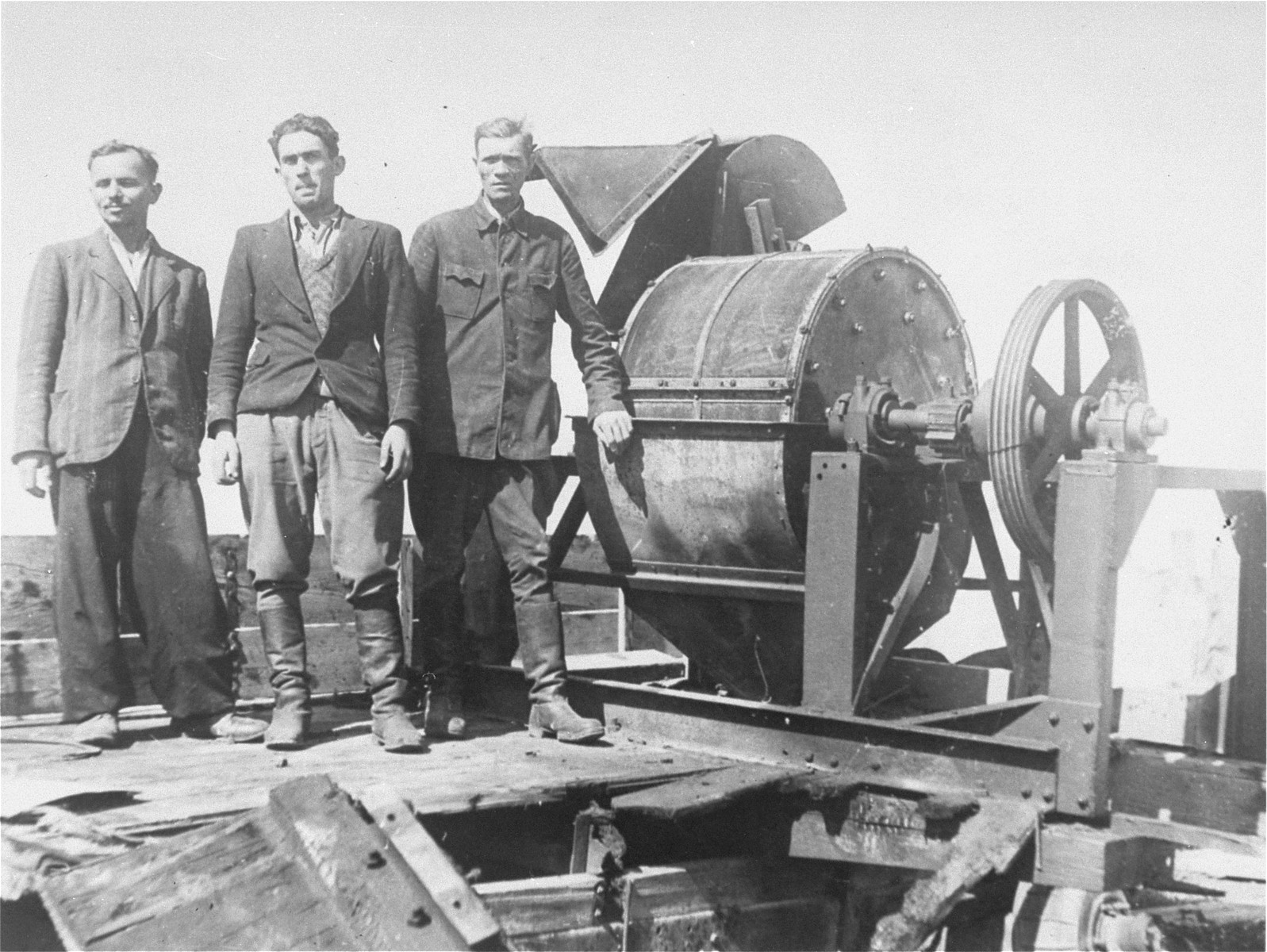
Former Sonderkommando 1005 slave laborers stand next to a bone crushing machine at the Janowska concentration camp. (Photo taken in August 1944, after camp's liberation)

The Nazis attempted to either partially or completely dismantle the extermination camps in order to hide any evidence that people had been murdered there. This was an attempt to conceal not only the extermination process but also the buried remains. As a result of the secretive Sonderaktion 1005, the camps were dismantled by commandos of condemned prisoners, their records were destroyed, and the mass graves were dug up. Some extermination camps that remained uncleared of evidence were liberated by Soviet troops, who followed different standards of documentation and openness than the Western allies did.

Nonetheless Majdanek was captured nearly intact due to the rapid advance of the Soviet Red Army during Operation Bagration.

== Commemoration ==
In the post-war period the government of the People's Republic of Poland created monuments at the extermination camp sites. These early monuments mentioned no ethnic, religious, or national particulars of the Nazi victims. The extermination camps sites have been accessible to everyone in recent decades. They are popular destinations for visitors from all over the world, especially the most infamous Nazi death camp, Auschwitz near the town of Oświęcim. In the early 1990s, the Jewish Holocaust organisations debated with the Polish Catholic groups about "What religious symbols of martyrdom are appropriate as memorials in a Nazi death camp such as Auschwitz?" The Jews opposed the placement of Christian memorials such as the Auschwitz cross near Auschwitz I where mostly Poles were killed. The Jewish victims of the Holocaust were mostly killed at Auschwitz II Birkenau.

The March of the Living is organized in Poland annually since 1988. Marchers come from countries as diverse as Estonia, New Zealand, Panama, and Turkey.

=== The camps and Holocaust denial ===
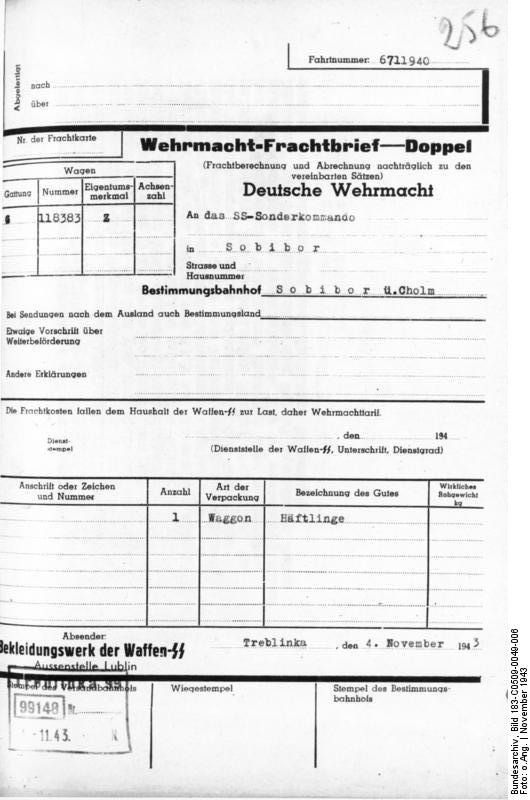
Documentary evidence: A Reichsbahn consignment note for delivering prisoners (Häftlinge) to Sobibór in November 1943.

Holocaust deniers or negationists are people and organizations who assert that the Holocaust did not occur, or that it did not occur in the historically recognized manner and extent. Holocaust deniers claim that the extermination camps were actually transit camps from which Jews were deported farther east. However, these theories are disproven by surviving German documents, which show that Jews were sent to the camps to be murdered.

Extermination camp research is difficult because of extensive attempts by the SS and Nazi regime to conceal the existence of the extermination camps. The existence of the extermination camps is firmly established by testimonies of camp survivors and Final Solution perpetrators, material evidence (the remaining camps, etc.), Nazi photographs and films of the killings, and camp administration records.

=== Awareness ===
In 2017 a Körber Foundation survey found that 40 percent of 14-year-olds in Germany did not know what Auschwitz was. A 2018 survey organized in the United States by the Claims Conference, United States Holocaust Memorial Museum, and others found that 66 percent of the American millennials who were surveyed (and 41 percent of all U.S. adults) did not know what Auschwitz was. In 2019, a survey of 1,100 Canadians found that 49 percent of them could not name any of the Nazi camps which were located in German-occupied Europe.

== See also ==
- German camps in occupied Poland during World War II
- List of Nazi extermination camps and euthanasia centers
- "Polish death camp" controversy
- Topf and Sons
- War crimes in occupied Poland during World War II

== Bibliography ==
- Arad, Yitzhak (1999). Belzec, Sobibor, Treblinka: The Operation Reinhard Death Camps. Indiana University Press. ISBN 978-0-253-21305-1.
- Bartov, Omer (2000). The Holocaust: origins, implementation, aftermath. London: Routledge. ISBN 0-415-15035-3 – via Google Books.
- Cox, John K. (2007). "Ante Pavelić and the Ustaša State in Croatia". In Fischer, Bernd Jürgen (ed.). Balkan Strongmen: Dictators and Authoritarian Rulers of South Eastern Europe. West Lafayette, Indiana: Purdue University Press. ISBN 978-1-55753-455-2. LCCN 60-5808 – via Google Books.
- Gilbert, Martin (1997). Holocaust Journey: Travelling in search of the past. Phoenix. ISBN 0-231-10965-2 – via Google Books. "An account of the locations of the extermination camps as they are today, augmented by the historical information about them, and about the fate of the Jews of Poland."
- Höss, Rudolf (1959). Commandant of Auschwitz. The Autobiography of Rudolf Hoess with an Introduction by Lord Russett (PDF). Translation Constantine FitzGibbon. Cleveland and New York: The World Publishing Company. pp. 1–311 – via direct download: 16.7 MB from Scribd.
- Klee, Ernst (1990). 'Turning the tap on was no big deal': the gassing doctors during the Nazi period and afterwards. Vol. 2. Dachau Review. ISBN 3-9808587-1-5 – via Google Books' snippet.
- Levi, Primo (1986). The Drowned and the Saved. London: Michael Joseph. ISBN 0-7181-3063-4 – via Google Books.
- Mojzes, Paul (2011). Balkan Genocides: Holocaust and Ethnic Cleansing in the Twentieth Century. Rowman & Littlefield. ISBN 978-1-4422-0663-2 – via Google Books.
- Orth, Karin (2009a). "The Genesis and Structure of the National Socialist Concentration Camps". Early Camps, Youth Camps, and Concentration Camps and Subcamps under the SS-Business Administration Main Office (WVHA). Encyclopedia of Camps and Ghettos, 1933–1945. Vol. 1. Indiana University Press. pp. 183–196. ISBN 978-0-253-35328-3.
- Piper, Franciszek (1994). "Gas Chambers and Crematoria". In Gutman, Yisrael; Berenbaum, Michael (eds.). Anatomy of the Auschwitz Death Camp. Bloomington, Indiana: Indiana University Press. ISBN 0-253-32684-2.
- Rees, Laurence (2006). Auschwitz: A New History. Public Affairs. ISBN 978-1-58648-357-9.
