= Zwangsarbeitslager für Juden =

German term used for Nazi concentration camps

Zwangsarbeitslager für Juden (ZALfJ, transl. 'forced labor camps for Jews') were a network of camps established and operated by Nazi Germany for the exploitation of Jewish forced labor. These camps were more numerous than ghettos in many parts of German-occupied Poland. After 1943, many of the camps were integrated into the larger network of Nazi concentration camps.
