= List of wild concentration camps =

List of early ad-hoc Nazi concentration camps

This is a list of concentration camps established independently by Nazi-affiliated groups and organizations (such as the SA, the SS, and police) before the process was centralized by Heinrich Himmler in 1934. These camps were established in a variety of usually abandoned buildings, including workhouses, factories, cellars, and taverns to imprison mostly political prisoners. They are known as "wild" concentration camps (German: wilde Konzentrationslager) due to their ad-hoc nature and lack of oversight. The 1933 Schutzhaft Protective Custody Order was the main pretense for interning German citizens in wild concentration camps.

Lists of Wilde Konzentrationslager.
Name	Established	Disestablished	Former usage
Breslau-Dürrgoy concentration camp	12 March 1933	10 August 1933	Fertilizer factory
Oranienburg concentration camp	21 March 1933	4 July 1934	Disused brewery
Hainichen concentration camp	4 April 1933	13 June 1933	Sports center
Börgermoor concentration camp	22 June 1933	May 1934	Part of the Prussian Emslandlager system
Esterwegen concentration camp	20 June 1933	Summer 1936	Part of the Prussian Emslandlager system
Neusustrum concentration camp	1 September 1933	April 1945	Part of the Prussian Emslandlager system
Vulkanwerft concentration camp	20 October 1933	11 March 1934	Shipyards
Columbia-Haus	July 1933	5 November 1936	Military police station
Dachau concentration camp	9 March 1933	29 April 1945	Gunpowder and munitions Factory
Sonnenburg	3 April 1933	23 April 1934	Former Prison
Nohra	3 March 1933	Unknown	School
Ahrensbök	October 3, 1933	May 1934	Residential Building for a Sugar Factory
Alt Daber	28 April 1933	July 1933	Children's Home and Sanatorium
Bad Sulza	October 1933	July 1937	Old Hotel
Brandenburg Euthanasia Centre	August 1933	February 1934	State Welfare Institute
Börnicke	1 June 1933	Unknown	Former Cement Factory
Breitenau concentration camp	June 1933	2 September 1945	Residence
Kemna concentration camp	5 July 1933	19 January 1934	Textile Factory

== See also ==
- Early camps
- List of Nazi concentration camps
- List of concentration and internment camps
