= Willi Veller =

German politician

Wilhelm "Willi" Veller (9 October 1896, Witten, Province of Westphalia – 22 June 1941) was a German politician and member of the Nazi Party and the SA. As chief of police (Polizeipräsident) in Wuppertal, he oversaw Kemna concentration camp until he was removed from his post. He was later sent to the Eastern Front, where he died fighting in Bredūnai (also known as Bredauen or Jagodne) in 1941.

== Life and work ==
Wilhelm Veller, known as Willi, was born in Witten, Province of Westphalia as the son of an independent businessman. After attending Volksschule and the Oberrealschule, he enlisted and fought at the beginning of World War I. He was wounded three times and promoted to sergeant. He was named an officer candidate in 1915. In 1916, became a prisoner of war in Russia, where he was held in prison in Siberia. He was able to flee after the Russian Revolution and return to Germany, where he returned to his old regiment. While on leave, he enrolled at the University of Bonn, where he later received a doctorate in philosophy. In August 1918, he joined the replacement pilots division in Altenburg. After the war, Veller returned home and worked in his father's business, taking it over in 1928, after his father died. He went bankrupt in 1930.

He joined the Nazi Party in 1924 and became a member of the Sturmabteilung, better known by as the SA. Veller reached the rank of an SA Brigade Führer and was named the SA Führer for the Düsseldorf sub-district. During the later years of the Weimar Republic, Veller, then SA Führer, took part in numerous political beer hall brawls, street fights and fisticuffs, both with political opponents and rivals within the Nazi movement. Later, bragging to Gregor Strasser in a February 1933 letter, he wrote that during the Weimar era, he political activities caused him to be brought before court more than thirty times, eight for assault and battery. Karl Ibach described Veller in his street fighting days as a "ruthless cutthroat". In November 1929, Veller became a city councilor in Wuppertal, remaining until 1933.

In the September 1930 parliamentary election, Veller was elected as a Nazi Party deputy to the Reichstag for electoral constituency 22 (Düsseldorf East) and retained this seat until November 1933. The most important legislative event in which Veller took part was the passage of the Enabling Act of March 1933, which formed the legal basis for the establishment of the Nazi dictatorship.

=== Nazi era: 1933–1941 ===
In July 1933, Veller was named Acting Chief of Police in Wuppertal. In this capacity, he organized the pursuit of local political opponents of Nazism and, using violence and terror, carried out the Gleichschaltung in the municipality. Ibach described the authority that Veller enjoyed at this provincial level, characterizing him as "Wuppertal's little Göring". At the same time, Veller was appointed SA Brigade Führer and a month later, commissioned to lead Wuppertal's SA Brigade 72.

As head of the local SA, Veller had the Kemna concentration camp set up in an empty textile factory in the Barmen district of Wuppertal. The Nazi Party's political opponents, including Veller's own opponents, were moved to the new camp from various locations in the region, where the mass of arrests following the Reichstag fire quickly began to overwhelm the capacity of jails and prisons. Prisoners were held in makeshift holding cells located wherever the SA could find space, in schools, churches, barracks, even the cellar where Veller's own offices were located in Schloss Jägerhof in the middle of Düsseldorf, where Veller had his SA staff guards torture the prisoners. At least one person was killed, his body dumped at the Bever Dam. Kemna opened in July 1933 and immediately began beating and tormenting the prisoners. Both the guards and their superiors, including Veller, drank heavily, and the worst of the beatings occurring when the guards were inebriated. Screaming emanating from the camp was clearly audible to those living and working nearby and rumors began circulating in Wuppertal about the torture of prisoners by the SA guards, which in turn led to pressure to close the camp.

Directed by Adolf Hitler, on 15 December 1933, SA Gruppenführer Heinrich Knickmann placed Veller and seven other senior Wuppertal SA leaders in "honorary detention" and on administrative leave. On 15 February 1934 he was relieved of his position as Wuppertal SA Standarte and demoted, accused of embezzling Party funds and of corruption. He was transferred to Dresden, to the staff of SA Obergruppe 4 with the rank of SA Standartenführer. In March 1934, he was relieved of his responsibilities as Wuppertal police chief.

After the Night of the Long Knives, an investigation was undertaken by the state's attorney and Veller and six other SA men were expelled from the Nazi Party for mistreatment of prisoners in protective custody. After an appeal by Veller, the decision was reversed by the Nazi Party's highest court in Munich in hearings on 19 and 20 February 1935. Instead, Veller's punishment was reduced to a warning. The case never went to trial and Gustav Winckler, the attorney who initiated the investigation, was transferred to another city. The case was closed as Winckler's superior recommended its suppression.

From January to December 1936, Veller was the SA Standarte 211 in the Pommern SA group, and beginning on 30 July, he was the Oberführer. On 1 January 1937 he began leading SA Brigade 22 in Küstrin. In April 1938, he tried unsuccessfully to be proposed for the party list for the Reichstag. In November 1939, he became the police chief in Oberhausen. While officially continuing in this capacity, on 3 September 1940, he was sent to the Eastern front, where he served as a sergeant and a platoon leader. Veller was killed in battle on 22 June 1941, at the start of Operation Barbarossa in Bredūnai (also known as Bredauen or Jagodne), which was then part of the region of Gumbinnen in East Prussia and is now in Nesterovsky District in Kaliningrad Oblast.

== Sources ==
- David Minert: Willi Veller – Ein SA-Schläger im Amt des Wuppertaler Polizeipräsidenten, s.l.e.a.
- Erich Stockhorst: 5000 Köpfe – Wer war was im Dritten Reich. Arndt, Kiel 2000, ISBN 3-88741-116-1
