= Hermann Lüdemann =

German politician (1880–1959)

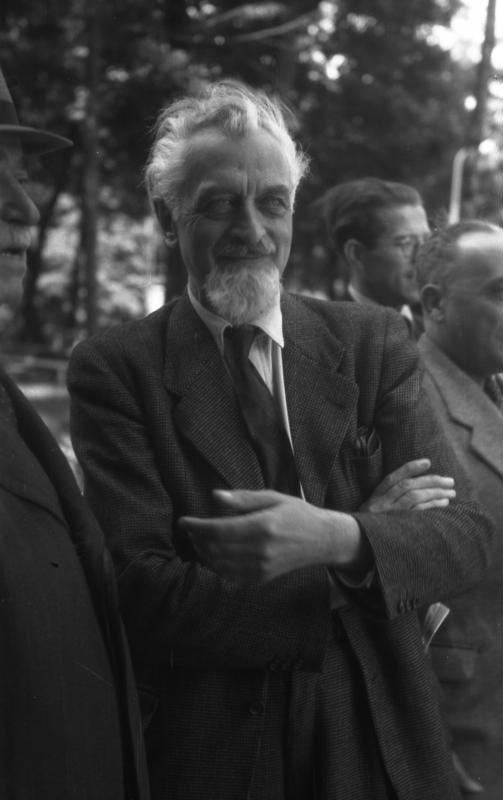
- Lüdemann in 1948

Minister-president, Schleswig-Holstein
- In office 29 April 1947 – 29 August 1949
- Preceded by: Theodor Steltzer
- Succeeded by: Bruno Diekmann

Interior Minister, Schleswig-Holstein
- In office 23 November 1946 – 6 November 1947
- Preceded by: Hermann von Mangoldt
- Succeeded by: Wilhelm Käber

Oberpräsident, Province of Lower Silesia
- In office 22 April 1928 – 20 July 1932
- Preceded by: Hermann Zimmer
- Succeeded by: Friedrich von Degenfeld-Schonburg

Finance Minister, Free State of Prussia
- In office 29 March 1920 – 21 April 1921
- Preceded by: Albert Südekum
- Succeeded by: Friedrich Saemisch

Additional positions
- 1946–1958: Landtag of Schleswig-Holstein Deputy
- 1921–1929: Landtag of Prussia Deputy

Personal details
- Born: 5 August 1880 Lübeck, German Empire
- Died: 27 May 1959 (aged 78) Kiel, Schleswig-Holstein, West Germany
- Party: Social Democratic Party of Germany
- Education: Technical University of Berlin
- Occupation: Mechanical engineer Trade union leader

Hermann Lüdemann (5 August 1880 – 27 May 1959) was a German engineer, trade union leader and politician of the Social Democratic Party of Germany. During the Weimar Republic, he served in the Landtag of Prussia, was the Prussian finance minister and the Oberpräsident of Lower Silesia. Persecuted by the Nazis, he was arrested and detained in various concentration camps. After the end of the Second World War, he was released and resumed a political career, serving in the Landtag of Schleswig-Holstein and as the minister-president of Schleswig-Holstein from 1947 to 1949.

== Early life and education ==
Lüdemann was born in Lübeck and attended the local Realschule and vocational school. He completed a three-year apprenticeship in mechanical engineering and studied at the University of Applied Sciences in Zwickau. Following six months of practical experience as a maritime machinist at sea, he continued his studies at the Technical University of Berlin. In 1905, he left engineering, which he had practiced since 1899, to dedicate himself full time to trade union activities as managing director of the Federation of Technical Employees and Civil Servants, which he had co-founded in 1904. He joined the Social Democratic Party of Germany (SPD) in 1912 and worked as a freelance writer in Berlin.

== Political career in the German Empire and the Weimar Republic ==
Lüdemann's political career began in 1915 with his election to the Berlin-Wilmersdorf city council, where he served until 1922. During the German revolution of 1918–1919, he was a member of the Workers' and Soldiers' Council in Berlin where he led the SPD faction. He worked as a consultant in the Reich Ministry of Labor from 1919 to 1920. From 1919 to 1921, he represented the Berlin Social Democrats in the Prussian Constituent Assembly and was elected to the Landtag of Prussia in 1921, serving as a deputy until 1929. He was named as the Prussian finance minister in Otto Braun's first cabinet from 29 March 1920 to 21 April 1921. After the SPD's electoral defeat in 1921, Lüdemann worked in the management of the public-sector construction workers' association in Berlin. In 1927, he was appointed as the Regierungspräsident (regional president) of Lüneburg. In 1928, he was advanced to the position of Oberpräsident of the Province of Lower Silesia. He was a staunch opponent of the Nazi Party but was dismissed from office by Chancellor Franz von Papen during the Prussian coup of July 1932.

== Persecution in Nazi Germany ==
Following the Nazi seizure of power in January 1933, Lüdemann was arrested by Edmund Heines, the police president of Breslau (today, Wrocław) and the leader of the Sturmabteilung (SA) in Silesia. For the next two years, Lüdemann was held in "protective custody" at the concentration camps of Breslau-Dürrgoy, Esterwegen, and Lichtenburg. Released in 1935, he earned a living as a cinema manager. Because of his contacts with the German resistance movement, he was arrested again after the 20 July 1944 plot to assassinate Adolf Hitler. His trial before the People's Court resulted in an acquittal on 28 January 1945, but not his release. He continued to be held in protective custody in concentration camps at Ravensbrück and Sachsenhausen. He was set free when the camp was liberated by the Red Army on 22 April 1945.

== Post-war political career ==
After the end of the war, Lüdemann resumed his political work, becoming the regional managing director of the recently reestablished SPD in Mecklenburg-Vorpommern in the Soviet occupation zone. Because he opposed the party's merger with the Communist Party of Germany, he was ousted from his position and banned from further political activity. He moved to Berlin where, from April to October 1946, he was the SPD party secretary. He then became minister of the interior and deputy minister-president of Schleswig-Holstein in the coalition cabinet of Theodor Steltzer from 23 November 1946 until 29 April 1947, when he succeeded Steltzer as minister-president. He also continued to head the interior ministry until 6 November, stepping down as minister-president on 29 August 1949. From 1946 to 1958, Lüdemann was a member of the Landtag of Schleswig-Holstein and, from 1951, he was a member of the SPD state executive committee. Lüdemann died at Kiel in May 1959.
