= Early camps =

Extrajudicial sites of detention in 1930s Nazi Germany

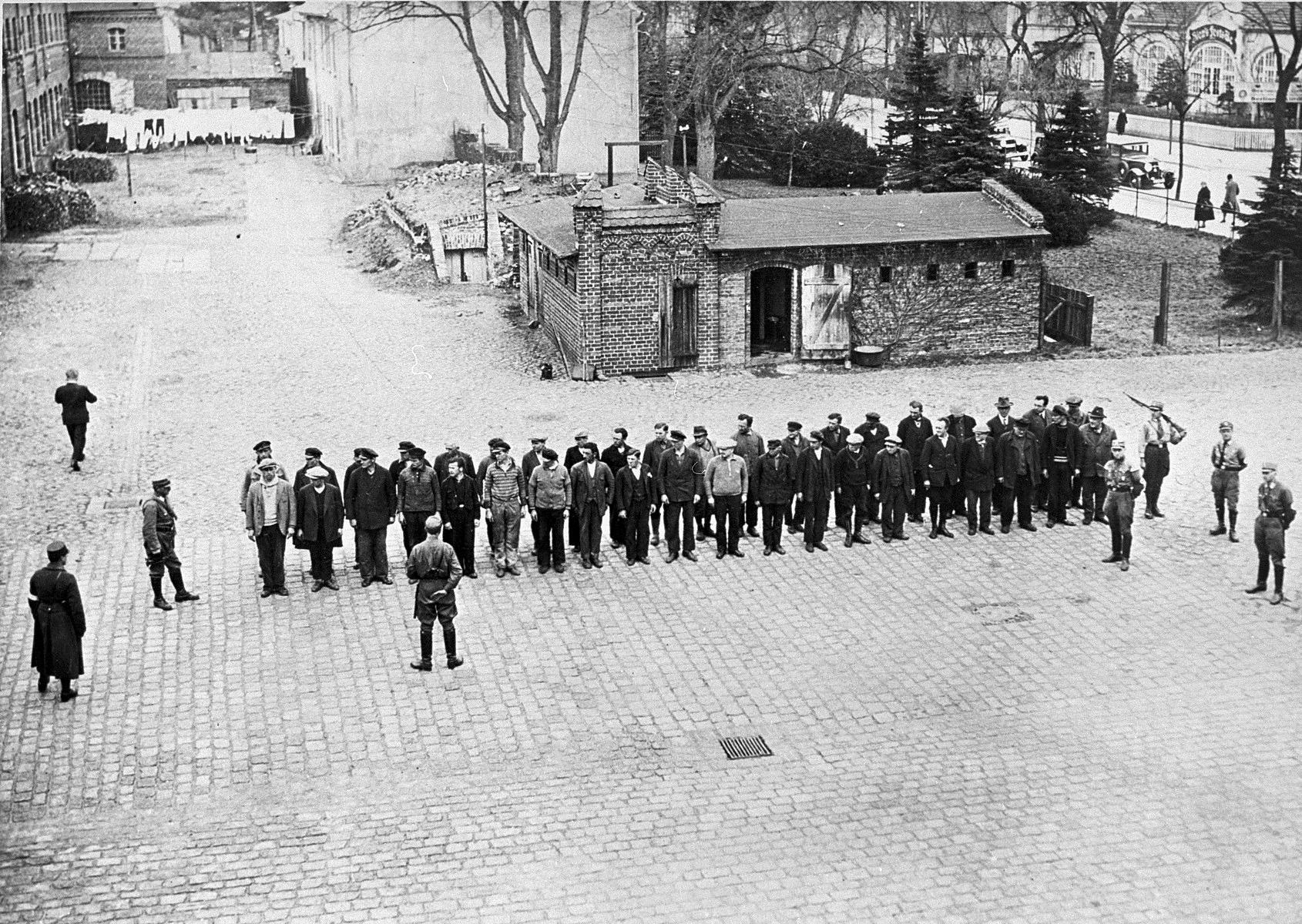
Prisoners guarded by SA men line up in the yard of Oranienburg concentration camp, 6 April 1933

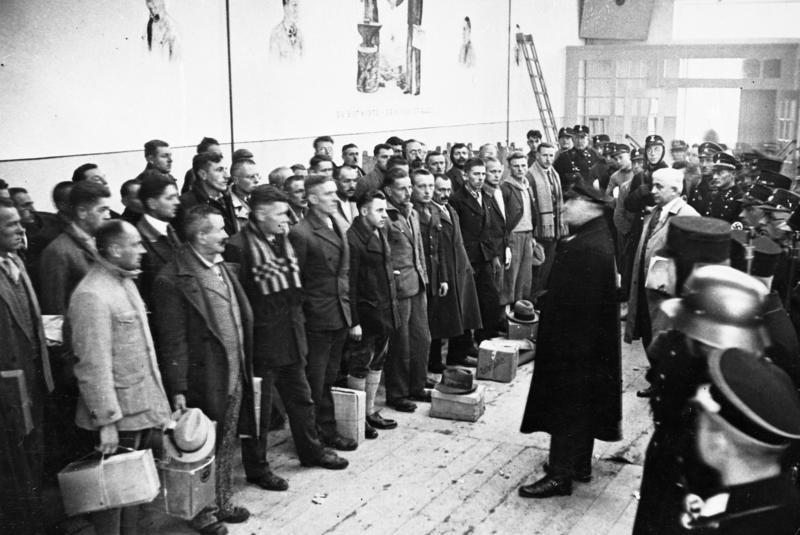
Commandant Theodor Eicke addresses 600 Dachau prisoners who were released for Christmas 1933.

The early camps were extrajudicial sites of detention established in Nazi Germany in 1933. Although the system was mostly dismantled by the end of the year, these camps were the precursor of the German Nazi concentration camps.

On 30 January 1933, Adolf Hitler became chancellor after striking a backroom deal with the previous chancellor, Franz von Papen. According to historian Nikolaus Wachsmann, the Nazis had no plan for concentration camps prior to their seizure of power. The concentration camp system arose in the following months due to the desire to suppress tens of thousands of Nazi opponents in Germany. The Reichstag fire in February 1933 was the pretext for mass arrests; the Reichstag Fire Decree eliminated the right to personal freedom enshrined in the Weimar Constitution. The first camp was Nohra, established in Nohra, Thuringia on 3 March 1933 in a school. The arrests increased after the election of 5 March.

The legal basis for the arrests was the previous practice of "protective custody", which meant either to restrict a person's liberty for their own protection, or "taking seditious elements into custody during emergencies", including some Communist Party of Germany (KPD) members in the Weimar Republic. Protective custody meant that imprisonment could continue after a person was acquitted or had completed their sentence. Newspapers at that time reported on the concentration camps in considerable detail and demonized the prisoners as dangerous leftist elements. Eighty percent of prisoners were Communists and ten percent Social Democrats; the remaining ten percent were affiliated with a different party, were trade union activists, or had no connection to a political party. By the end of the year, 241 former Reichstag deputies under Weimar had been arrested. Many prisoners were released in late 1933, and after the well-publicized Christmas amnesty, there were only a few dozen camps left.

The number of prisoners in 1933–1934 is difficult to determine; Jane Caplan estimated it at 50,000, with arrests perhaps exceeding 100,000, while Wachsmann estimated that between 150,000 and 200,000 people were subjected to detention without trial in 1933. About 70 camps were established in 1933, in any convenient structure that could hold prisoners, including vacant factories, prisons, country estates, schools, workhouses, and castles. Many sites were reused as Nazi detention facilities later on. There was no national system; camps were operated by local police, SS, and SA, state interior ministries, or a combination of the above. The early camps in 1933–1934 were heterogenous and unlike those created in and after 1936, in fundamental aspects such as organization, conditions, and the groups imprisoned. Therefore, researchers have begun to call them "early camps" rather than "concentration camps". Although the camps were not sites of routine killings, their unprecedented violence marked the end of the Weimar Republic.

== See also ==
- List of Nazi concentration camps
- List of wild concentration camps
- List of concentration and internment camps

== Sources ==
- Buggeln, Marc (2015). "Forced Labour in Nazi Concentration Camps". Global Convict Labour. Brill. pp. 333–360. ISBN 978-90-04-28501-9.
- Fings, Karola (2009). "The public face of the camps". Concentration Camps in Nazi Germany: The New Histories. Routledge. pp. 108–126. ISBN 978-1-135-26322-5.
- Orth, Karin (2009a). "The Genesis and Structure of the National Socialist Concentration Camps". Early Camps, Youth Camps, and Concentration Camps and Subcamps under the SS-Business Administration Main Office (WVHA). Encyclopedia of Camps and Ghettos, 1933–1945. Vol. 1. Indiana University Press. pp. 183–196. ISBN 978-0-253-35328-3.
- Wachsmann, Nikolaus (2009). "The dynamics of destruction: The development of the concentration camps, 1933–1945". Concentration Camps in Nazi Germany: The New Histories. Routledge. pp. 17–43. ISBN 978-1-135-26322-5.
- White, Joseph Robert (2009). "Introduction to the Early Camps". Early Camps, Youth Camps, and Concentration Camps and Subcamps under the SS-Business Administration Main Office (WVHA). Encyclopedia of Camps and Ghettos, 1933–1945. Vol. 1. Indiana University Press. pp. 3–16. ISBN 978-0-253-35328-3.
