= Kemna concentration camp =

Nazi concentration camp in Germany

- Early concentration camp
- Main building, c. 1934

- Location of camp in contemporary Germany
- Coordinates: 51°15′18.5″N 7°15′19.6″E
- Other names: Wuppertal-Barmen concentration camp
- Known for: torture
- Location: Wuppertal, Germany
- Operated by: SA
- Original use: textile factory
- Operational: July 5, 1933 – January 19, 1934
- Number of gas chambers: none
- Inmates: political, religious, unionist
- Number of inmates: 1,100 maximum; 2,500 – 5,000 total
- Killed: unknown
- Notable inmates: Karl Ibach; Oskar Hoffmann; Heinz Kiwitz; Friedrich Senger; Günther Strupp
- Website: www.kz-kemna.de (in German)

Kemna concentration camp (German: Konzentrationslager Kemna, KZ Kemna) was one of the early Nazi concentration camps, created by the Third Reich to incarcerate their political opponents (ostensibly in protective custody) after the Nazi Party first seized power in 1933. The camp was established in a former factory on the Wupper river in the Kemna neighborhood of the Barmen quarter of Wuppertal. It was run by the SA group in Düsseldorf.

The purpose of the early concentration camps was to repress and terrorize opponents of the new regime, primarily communists, but also socialists, dissenting Christians, (Note: The Nazi Party advocated its own brand of Christianity, called Positive Christianity. Christians pursued by the Nazi Party included those with the Confessing Church, Martin Niemöller, Dietrich Bonhoeffer, Hans Ehrenberg and others who dissented. When the later concentration camps were organized, individuals were issued purple triangles, primarily Jehovah's Witnesses, who refused to swear allegiance to the Third Reich, but also Christian Scientists, Seventh-day Adventists, Roman Catholics and others. (See also Persecution of Christians in Nazi Germany and History of persecutions by Christians.)) and trade unionists. Unlike later concentration camps, the prisoners and the guards at Kemna were from the same cities and in many cases, knew each other and were already enemies from the German Revolution of 1918–1919 and subsequent political battles of the 1920s. Torture was practiced and the screams of the men were audible to people living and working nearby, and severely injured men were taken to nearby hospitals, all causing word of the camp's misdeeds to spread quickly. There was a major release of prisoners in October 1933; those released were forced to sign a document promising to keep secret all they had seen and experienced at the camp, and were threatened with re-arrest if they disobeyed. The Nazis wanted the public to become familiar with the term "concentration camp" and regard it with dread, but worried that the excesses at Kemna and the other early concentration camps would turn public opinion against them and thwart their plans. As a result, the camp was closed in January 1934, just six months after it opened. After the SA lost political influence, reports of torture led to an investigation and eventually to hearings and the perpetrators given a warning. No crimes were prosecuted.

After the war, the Kemna Trial became the first major German trial regarding a concentration camp. Nonetheless, the camp was afterward largely forgotten, with no research into its past and for decades, only two sources supplying most of the information known about the camp. In 1983, a monument honoring the prisoners who suffered there was installed across the street from the former concentration camp; the builders of the monument were forbidden by the owner of the property from erecting any memorial on the site itself.

== History ==
After the Reichstag fire of February 27, 1933, and the subsequent Reichstag Fire Decree suspended most civil liberties, the Nazis moved quickly to debilitate their political enemies. They conducted mass arrests of some 10,000 of their political opponents within just a few days, intending not just to confine, but also to weaken them physically and mentally through terror. The sudden surge of thousands of new prisoners created a critical shortage of places to confine them. Interior Minister of Prussia Hermann Göring began to look for regional locations in cities for short-term, temporary means to house the newly arrested. Between March and May 1933, prisoners in the Bergisches Land were housed by the dozens in schools, SA barracks, cellars and other locations; prisons moved their women to other locations to make more room for the new prisoners. These were all in residential areas, however, and the torture already being practiced caused unrest in the community, prompting the SA to seek a new, larger location on the outskirts of town. They found a suitable location, an empty factory in Wuppertal, the owner of which, on a promise by the local district government to purchase the property later, agreed to allow the SA to use rent-free in the short term.

Kemna became one of the first concentration camps in Germany, and existed from July 5, 1933 to January 19, 1934. It was run by the Düsseldorf SA and Wuppertal police chief (Polizeipräsident) Willi Veller and backed by the Düsseldorf district government. The first commandant, SA Sturmführer Hugo Neuhoff, was soon replaced by Alfred Hilgers, who, at the same time was the SA Standarte 258 of the Koburg Protective Custody camp in Mettmann. In a space expected to hold 200-300 prisoners, the SA guards confined up to 1,100 prisoners in unsanitary, overcrowded conditions in a former textile factory on Beyenburger Straße, directly on the banks of the Wupper. Torture and arbitrary violence were daily events. To maintain order and help run the institution, the SA established a hierarchy within the prisoner population, choosing some to work as prisoner functionaries and by establishing some of the large holding cells in the building as preferable to others. There was a major release of prisoners in October 1933, but for many, Kemna was just the first place of confinement on the way to other concentration camps.

In the evening and particularly at night, the screams of prisoners were heard at a bar 600 meters (0.37 mi) from the camp, as well as by people who lived across the Wupper. On the weekend, family members and friends of those incarcerated, as well as others, who were merely curious, took walks in the neighboring woods, from where the camp was clearly visible. Articles appeared in the local press, referring obliquely to "enhanced interrogations" and explaining the need for a firm hand to deal with the type of prisoners held there. Locals began warning each other with the saying, "Watch yourself, or you'll end up in Kemna!" With rumors about the camp spreading, the Nazis emptied and closed the camp just six months after it opened, fearing the risk to their image at home and abroad. Although the Third Reich wanted the public to become familiar with the term "concentration camp" (in German, Konzentrationslager) and understand its implications enough to dread it, it was concerned about the consequences of public awareness of the practice of torture at Kemna and the other early concentration camps.

The prisoners were brought to Emslandlager, forced to sing, as they marched out of Kemna, "Forward, march to Emsland, Camp Kemna is closed—happy is he who forgets". The German word for happy, "glücklich", also means "lucky" or "fortunate".

== The camp ==
=== Buildings and grounds ===
Kemna concentration camp is located in the Barmen quarter of Wuppertal on 8,700 m^{2} (2.1 acres) at Beyenburger Straße 146. The camp was sometimes referred to as "Konzentrationslager Wuppertal-Barmen", the name printed as the return address on postcards sent by prisoners, but is primarily known as "KZ Kemna", KZ being the German abbreviation for "concentration camp".

The main building was a four-story former factory at number 146. (Note: German references describe the building as "three-story" because the ground floor is not counted as a story.) Also on the grounds were a house at number 142, a boiler unit and some smaller buildings. A 3 m (9.8 ft) chain-link fence, topped with barbed wire surrounded the property, replacing a barbed wire barrier that was originally erected. On the ground floor of the main building were the kitchen, laundry room and a registration room where all new prisoners were recorded. Above that, on the second floor, were the quarters for the commandant and room three, which initially provided quarters for the guard staff and, during that time, was where most of the torture took place. The third floor was divided into two rooms where the prisoners were housed, rooms four and five. All the windows in these rooms were painted black, both inside and out, preventing prisoners from looking out and passersby from looking in, and causing the rooms to be dark, even during the day. Nonetheless, these rooms were considered the best; they were outfitted with beds, tables and benches in the summer of 1933, and were not as close to the torture area. The attic floor contained a clothing storeroom, an orderly room and prisoner quarters for Nazis placed in "protective custody". Special cells for harsh punishment were the freight elevator and cubicles under the stairs, where prisoners were forced to crouch for hours.

Rooms one and two, also prisoner housing, were in two one-story buildings closer to the river and where until October 1933, the prisoners had no beds and slept directly on the ground, with just a bit of straw underneath them. Room one led to the "bunker", a concrete former coke storage room adjacent to the boiler unit, and the infirmary. The heating equipment was non-functional; a battlefield forge stood in the unit. The bunker was 16 m^{2} (170 sq ft), with one small opening and an iron door leading to room one. New prisoners lived there for days, even weeks. As many as 50 men at a time were forced to live there in stifling air and heat; one witness said, "The exhaled breath of those locked up was so great that water condensed and ran under the door, as if poured from a bucket."

Room two led to the toilets and contained a small room where food was served and a 17-man crew peeled potatoes for the kitchen. In late September 1933, in preparation for a large transport of 200 men, the guards' quarters and the infirmary were moved into the house, which had previously been empty. Afterward, the former infirmary became the main torture room and a new infirmary was set up in a walled-off section of room two. Of the prisoner housing, room one was considered the worst because there was an increased likelihood of attracting the attention of a passing SA man, an occurrence that could lead to immediate abuse. Most feared by the prisoners, however, were the torture rooms; the bunker, the freight elevator and the cubicles, where inmates were denied even the normal camp standards of meals, washing, toilets and the infirmary.

In addition to these, a wing was added to the main building with the prisoners forced to provide the labor. The new wing had guards' quarters, plus individual cells and a sound-insulated interrogation room. The SA began using the new wing in December 1933 just before the camp was closed.

=== The prisoners ===
The total number of prisoners is estimated to have been between 2,500 and 5,000. The number is difficult to ascertain because camp records were destroyed and there is little other information from which a precise number can be deduced. Of the total number of prisoners, 646 people have been identified by name.

Those imprisoned were primarily those swept up in mass arrests of political opponents from the Communist Party (Kommunistische Partei Deutschlands, KPD) and the Social Democrats (Sozialdemokratische Partei Deutschlands, SPD) from the Bergisches Land, also certain unaligned Christians, and unionists. Jews who were there were imprisoned for their political views, not because they were Jews, although the SA's anti-semitism resulted in worse treatment if one even appeared to be Jewish. There were also transports and others arrested individually from the area, including nearby cities such as Duisburg, Düsseldorf, Krefeld and Essen. While the guards in other concentration camps were from various parts of Germany, prisoners and guards at Kemna were all from the same area and often knew each other personally. Some prisoners were prominent in their areas or in the region and were considered "trophy prisoners" and subjected to especially harsh treatment and vengeful torment. These "big shots", as the SA called them, included Heinrich Hirtsiefer, a former Prussian Vice Minister President, Wilhelm Bökenkrüger, a former director of the Wuppertal employment office, and Georg Petersdorff, the secretary of the Düsseldorf and Cologne Reichsbanner Gaue. Despite the beatings and torture, of those prisoners who were released, most resumed their anti-Nazi activities.

=== Torture and torment ===
Beatings at Kemna, as at other early concentration camps, were frequent, beginning with the "welcome beating" on arrival at the camp right through to having to run a gauntlet when leaving. Because prisoners and guards were political opponents who were former neighbors and co-workers, punishment and torture at Kemna took on a personal nature. Prisoners were brought to interrogations naked and gagged with cloth stuffed in their mouths, were tied to special whipping benches, where they were whipped with rubber clubs, whips and sticks. Bleeding, they were then locked in a cubicle under the stairs, where they could neither sit nor stand and cigarette smoke was blown through the air holes. Beforehand, prisoners were made to eat "appetizers" of unsoaked salt herring smeared with lubricating grease or feces; when they regurgitated, they were forced to lick up the vomit. In November, prisoners with fresh wounds were thrown into the cold waters of the Wupper and afterwards, made to stay in their wet clothes. There were also simulated executions. According to one former SA paramedic, about 25 prisoners attempted suicide; others succeeded or simply died from the effects of the torture. Some survivors were crippled mentally or physically from their treatment, some for the rest of their lives.

Beatings and torture were so routine at Kemna, that the SA-Oberscharführer Bruno Wolff, who served as deputy camp commandant during the last three months of Kemna's existence, was quite open when asked about prisoner abuse in an interview with the state's attorney in 1934.

It is correct, that many prisoners in protective custody were beaten. The beatings take place mostly during interrogations ... Now, if the prisoners didn't want to say anything, then they were beaten, namely with fists and truncheons, sometimes also with a whip ... As far as the normal scope of beating prisoners is concerned, we have deemed it justified, since the official authorities, who at times viewed the beatings and at times took part in them, in part knew of the beatings and condoned and tolerated our approach. If in one or another case the mistreatment exceeded the normal scope, this was entirely the result of the behavior of the prisoner himself.

— Bruno Wolff to the state's attorney, 1934

The brutality was aggravated by alcohol, particularly at night. Frequent and extreme drunkenness, which was a common problem within the SA, aggravated the situation at Kemna, as numerous former inmates later testified. Typically, off-duty guards would go out drinking at nearby taverns and hours later, return inebriated, ready to take part in interrogations. Sometimes, they would begin their own so-called interrogations, unsupervised. Local taverns, normally closed at the hours the guards were ready to drink, were faced with violence and threats if they did not re-open. Willi Veller's drinking was so out of control that he was incapable of showing up for work on a regular basis—and it was no secret.

== Legal action ==
=== During the Nazi era ===
Because of the many severely injured prisoners who were brought to the local hospitals, rumors about Kemna began to spread, although cautiously, since speaking about the situation could land one in the same predicament. On March 8, 1934, the state's attorney, Gustav Winckler, made his first report to his superior, Günther Joël, regarding Kemna. On July 16, 1934, an account from a former Kemna prisoner appeared in the Wuppertal press. After the Night of the Long Knives, when the SA was purged, its top leaders removed and its power curbed just two weeks later, Joël began an investigation and soon had a number of witnesses willing to testify.

Staff of SA guards at Kemna, ca. November 1933

Concurrently, opponents of Veller from within the party contacted Joël to warn him of the influence of the "Veller clique", Wolff and the Düsseldorf state police. They also sought support from Rudolf Hess, then Hitler's deputy, who had the Reichsinspekteur conduct an investigation. The Reichsinspekteur met with Winckler, who gave him the findings of his own investigation and urged him to resolve the charges unequivocally. Days later, on August 18, 1934, Hess issued a temporary injunction for "abuse of the gravest kind against protective custody prisoners at Camp Kemna" against Veller, Hans Pfeiffer, Hilgers, Wolff and three other SA leaders from Wuppertal. All were expelled from the Nazi Party.

Although the ministry of justice had handed out letters of protection to their informants, one was taken into protective custody as soon as word of Winckler's investigation spread. The informant was released after five days, after Joël was informed and intervened. The regional Nazi leadership unleashed a barrage of attacks—including death threats—against Winckler, himself a Nazi Party member, hauling him before the party court. In mid-December 1934, Prussian Ministry of Justice state secretary, Roland Freisler ordered the files on the case to be turned over to the Nazi Gau leadership. The party then immediately initiated proceedings at the highest party court in Munich, which was already dealing with objections to the expulsions. The main hearings were held February 19–20, 1935. The accused had numerous witnesses, including some prominent individuals. It also issued an opinion on two deaths of former inmates attributed to their confinement, though the deaths took place in hospitals after Kemna had closed. (Note: Karl Erlemann died in Galkhausen on January 9, 1934 at the age of 39. Otto Böhne died on February 25, 1934, at Papenburg hospital at the age of 36. A third death was not mentioned, that of Kuno Haas, on May 11, 1934 at a care facility in Bonn.)

Under pressure from Göring's personal adjutant, the case was later reopened in hearings before the highest party court. The court found that the investigations had been conducted in a one-sided manner, with testimony coming only from "implacable enemies of the new state" whose credibility the judge questioned. Although the accused had gone beyond the point "necessary to break the resistance" and had "as a result, transgressed the Führer's order, that the National Socialist state well knows how to render his opponent harmless, but beyond that, eschews all vengeance". The court noted that the SA in the Wuppertal industrial area had to contend with especially persistent communist opponents, who never stopped trying to organize underground, even after the Machtergreifung; and that this behavior of the state's attorney has given impetus to this element. On April 1, 1935, more than a year after the camp was closed, the court lifted the injunction and gave the accused a reprimand.

The state's attorney conducted three more examinations of witnesses and on January 18, 1936, sent his report and the case files to the Reich's ministry of justice. The report gave little attention to criminal proceedings, and little store was set by the witnesses. Joël concluded by recommending that the entire case be suppressed.

=== Postwar: the Kemna Trial ===
Nazi Germany surrendered unconditionally on May 8, 1945, and barely two weeks later, Herbert Claus, a former Kemna prisoner and before that, a police wachtmeister, wrote a letter to the Wuppertal criminal police making serious accusations against a former Kemna guard, Hermann Warnstedt. Newly re-employed in the office was Johannes Pauli, another former Kemna prisoner, who, recognizing the charges from his own experience, set the cogs in motion and on July 12, 1945, Warnstedt was arrested. Other former Kemna prisoners also began to report their experiences and more arrests followed.

On December 20, 1945, the Allied Control Council established a new law, "crimes against humanity", with the definition, “Atrocities and offenses, including but not limited to murder, extermination, enslavement, deportation, imprisonment, torture, rape, or other inhumane acts committed against any civilian population, or persecutions on political, racial or religious grounds whether or not in violation of the domestic laws of the country where perpetrated.” Following this, on August 30, 1946, the British military government approved the jurisdiction of German courts to handle such crimes when they did not involve other nationals, but were German against Germans.

In November 1946, the Wuppertal branch of the Union of Persecutees of the Nazi Regime (VVN) began work to re-open the case against Kemna and to pursue other cases of Nazi war crimes. They located Winckler, who had been transferred to Kassel in 1935 and returned to Wuppertal in 1946. (Note: After the war, returning to Wuppertal after having been interned by the Americans, Winckler was unable to get work in his profession, so he took a job as a spray painter in an oven factory. A co-worker who was in the VVN, noticed him and upon learning who he was, said, "We've been looking for you since 1945 so you can continue the Kemna Trial!") Winckler began working on the case again.

The first major German trial regarding a concentration camp was about Kemna, the Kemna Prozeß in 1948. Thirty people were charged, either with having been responsible for the crimes that took place there, or for having carried them out. The fact that guards and prisoners had often been known to one another from the Kampfzeit, the turbulent "fighting times" from 1919 through the 1920s, then became a defense as guards claimed that at Kemna, they had only tried to gain some delayed satisfaction for prior assaults. Hilgers was sentenced to death. The sentence was later reduced to life imprisonment in a Zuchthaus and in 1956, he was granted clemency and was released on December 21.

== Memorials ==
Across the road from the former site of Kemna concentration camp is a small lane that leads to a monument honoring the victims of the camp. It was installed across the road rather than at the actual site of the camp because the owner of the factory then in the building would not allow the monument to be placed there. The main building and an addition, built by the prisoners, were renovated, and still exist, as does a house that belonged to the camp. Neither the buildings nor the property are protected as landmarks.

Kemna concentration camp memorial
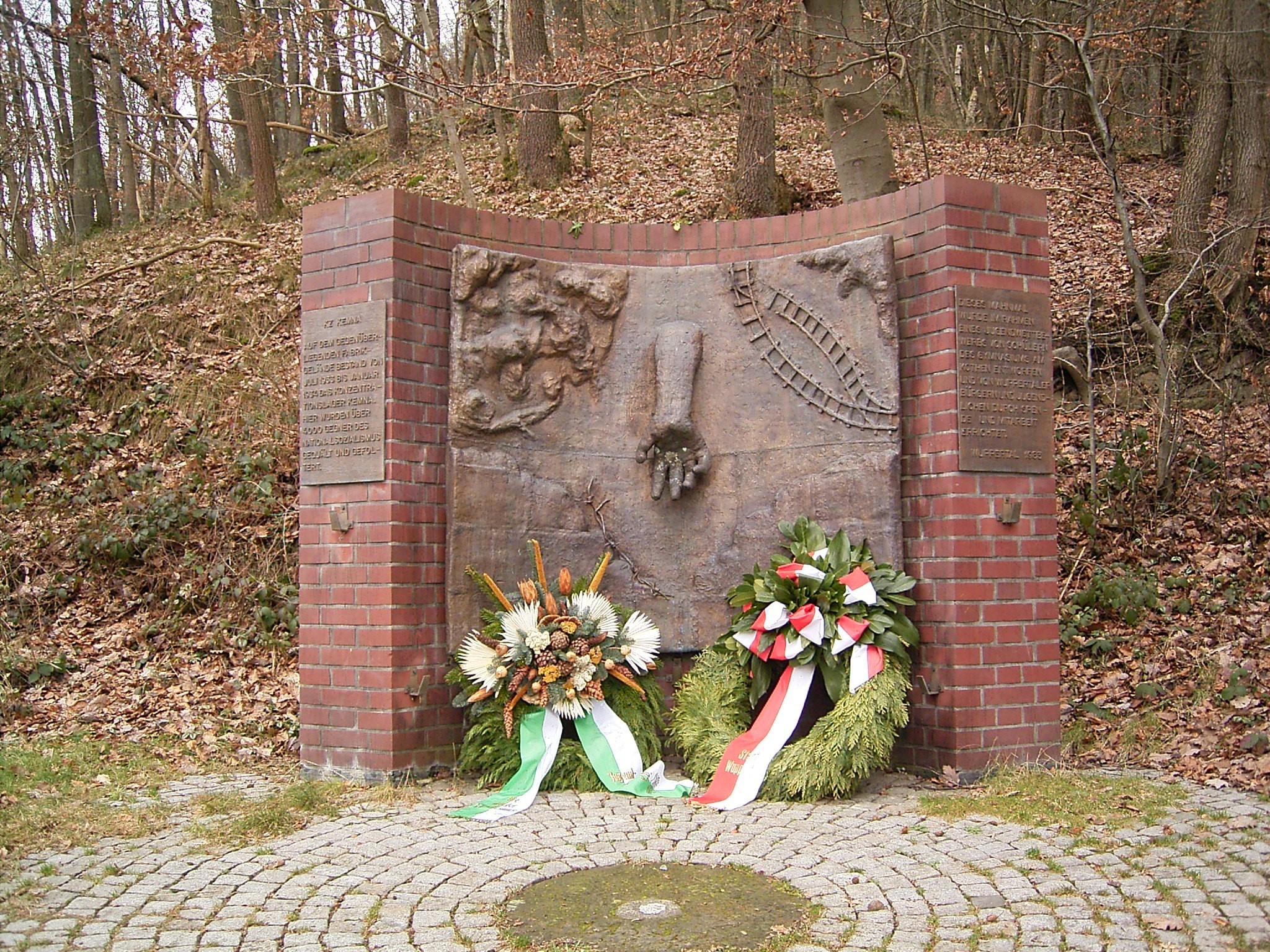
Front of monument

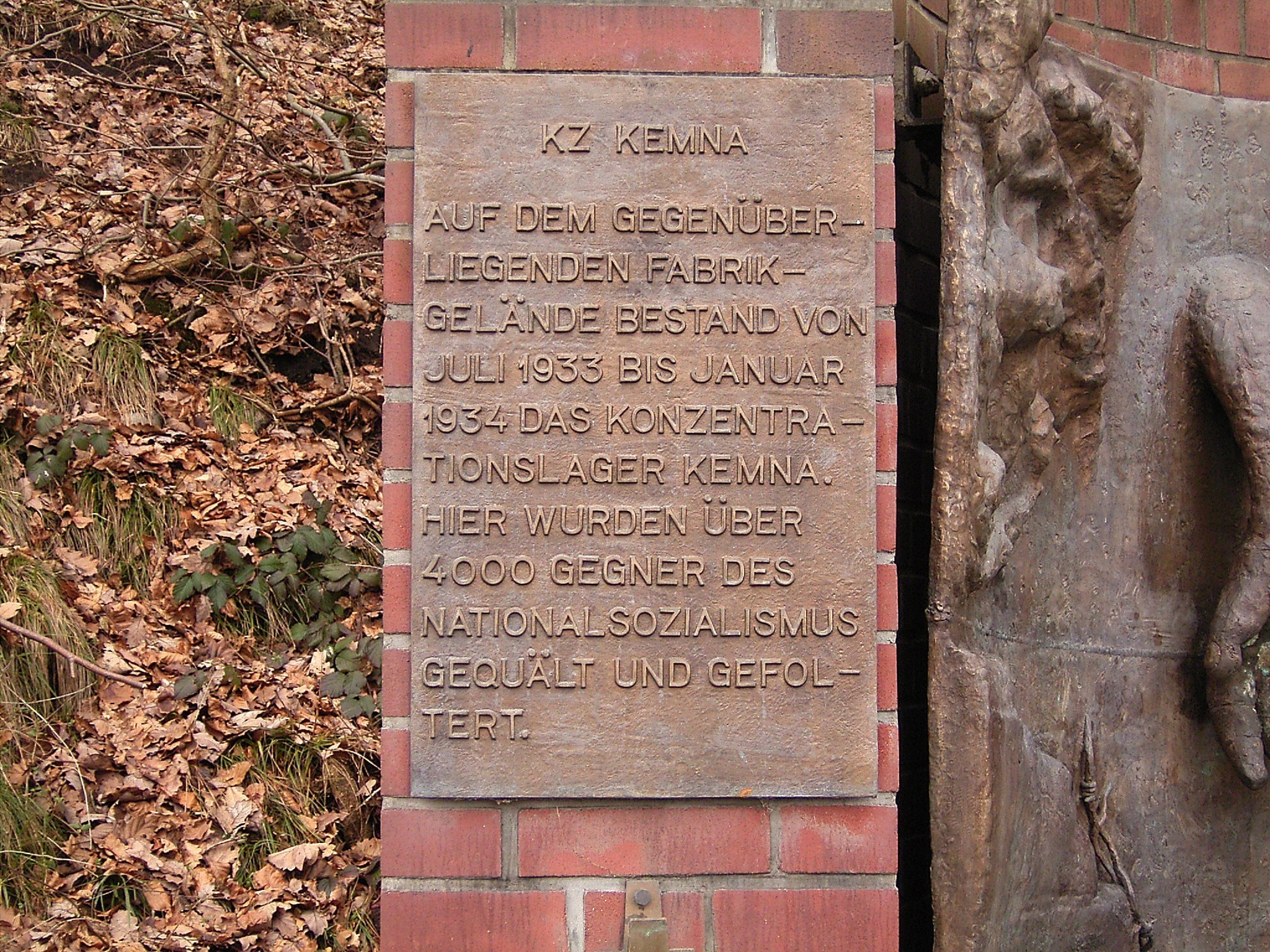
Plaque on left side of monument

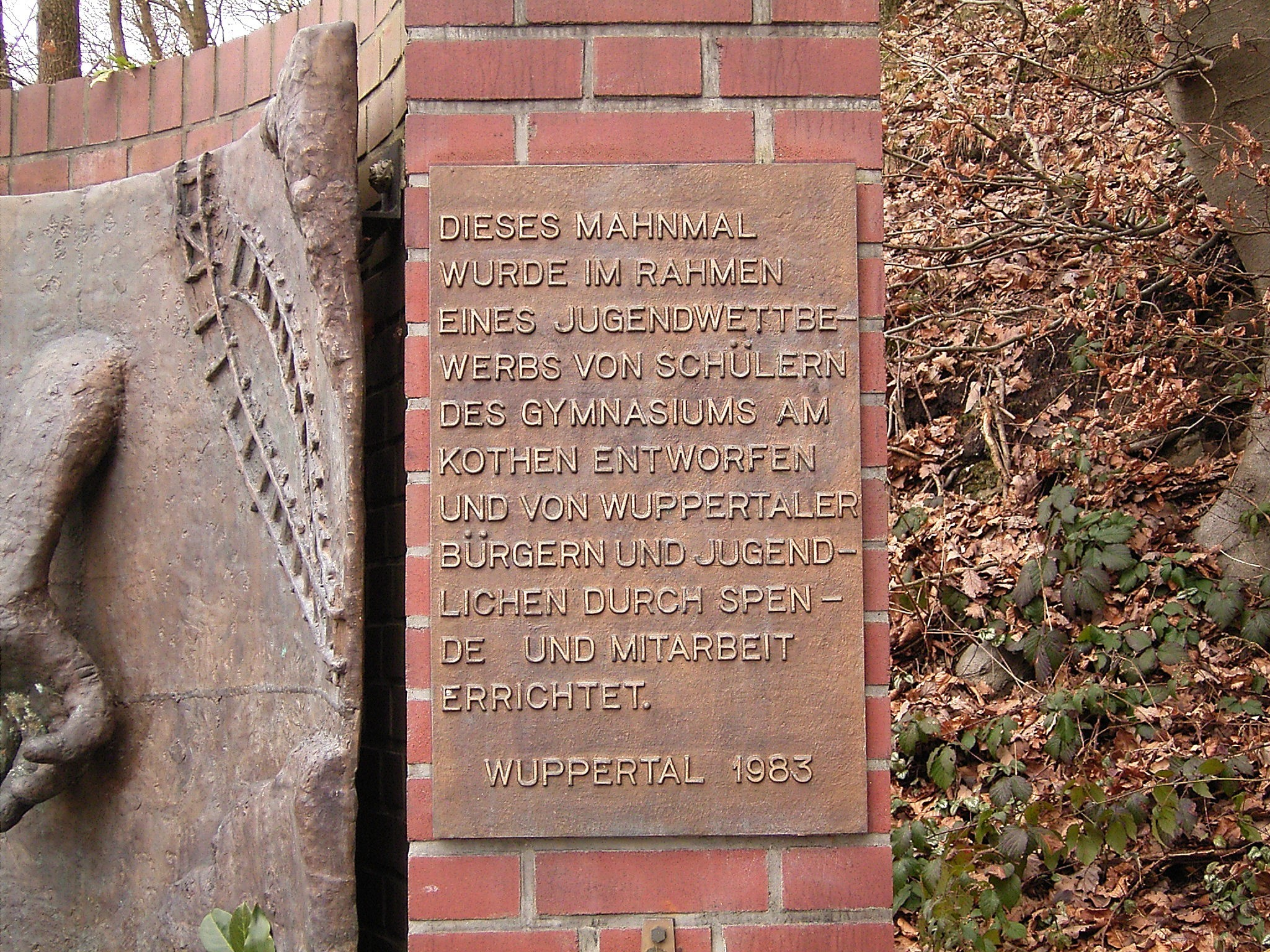
Plaque on right side of monument

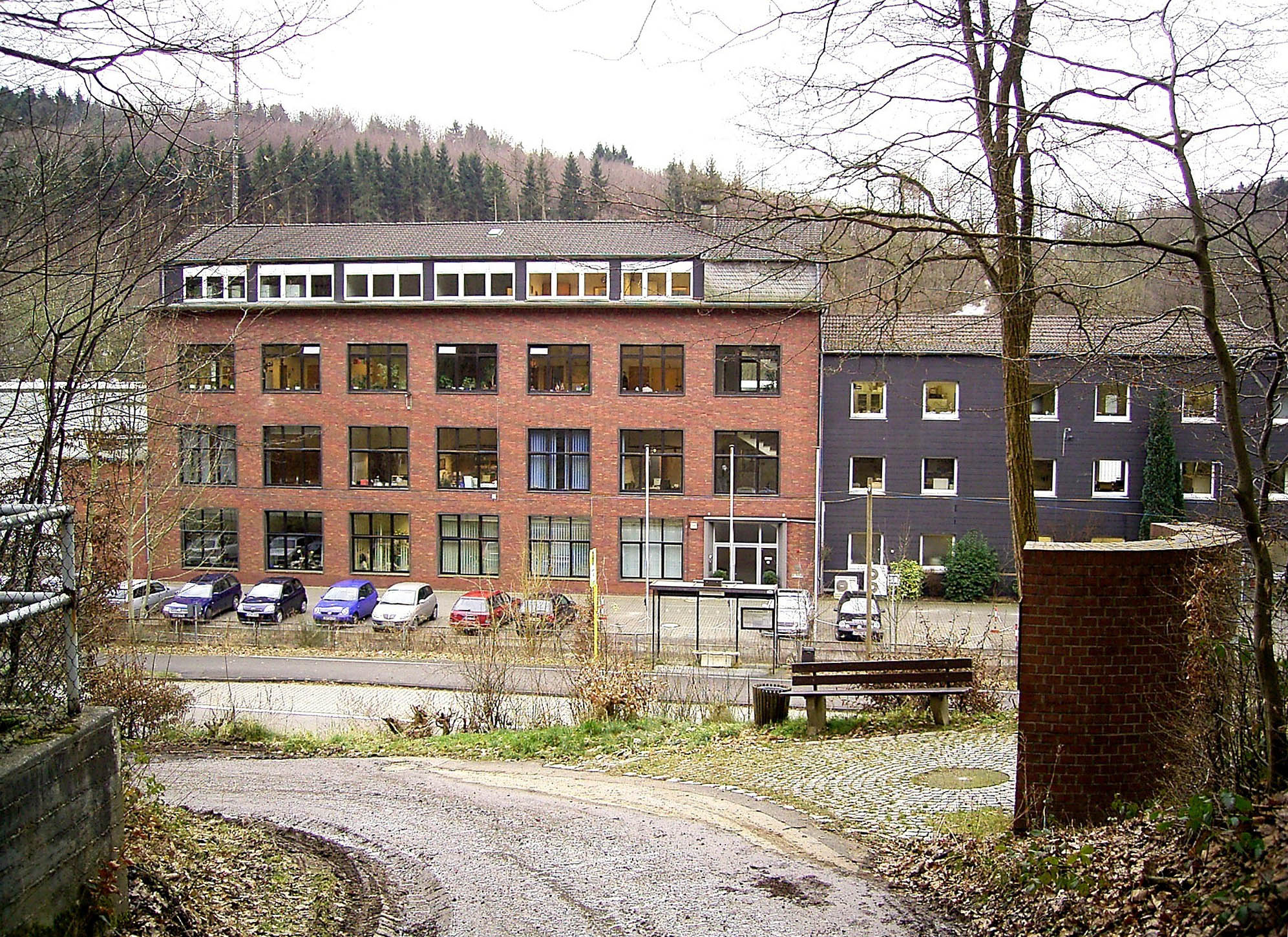
Former concentration camp as it looks today; monument is in foreground (at right)

The monument contains a bronze-relief, which depicts several images that refer to aspects of the prisoners' life at the camp. Its creation and placement was organized by pupils of the Gymnasium am Kothen, a secondary school in Wuppertal. The monument was placed in 1983, in time for the 50th anniversary of the establishment of the camp. The lane leading to the monument was named after Karl Ibach, who entered the camp at the age of 18. Three other locations in Wuppertal are also named for former Kemna prisoners: Friedrich-Senger-Platz, Otto-Böhne-Platz and Oskar-Hoffmann-Treppe.

In 1948 Ibach wrote a book about the camp, which for decades was one of only two sources of information about it. There is a 3.6 kilometers (2.2 mi)-long path from the market square in Langerfeld to the memorial. Marked with handmade wooden signs along the way, it was built in 2001 by a Wuppertal youth organization and representatives of several secondary schools.

In 1999 and 2000, the monument was vandalized and a Union of Persecutees of the Nazi Regime event at the memorial was attacked by 14 right-wing extremists. The subsequent trial attracted attention from all over Germany.

From June 4 to July 10, 2005, the story of Kemna concentration camp was documented in an exhibition at the Wülfing-Museum in Radevormwald which featured photos and documents from the period, as well as biographies of the Kemna victims from Radevormwald, Wermelskirchen and Hückeswagen. The Radevormwald community center has a memorial plaque with the names of 16 victims, who represent some 200 local citizens who suffered at Kemna in 1933.

== Notable prisoners ==
- Wilhelm Bökenkrüger, former director of the Wuppertal employment office
- Heinrich Hirtsiefer (September 26, 1933 – October 12, 1933), former Prussian Vice Minister President and Minister of Welfare
- Oskar Hoffmann
- Karl Ibach, 18-year-old prisoner and in 1948, author of a book about Kemna
- Heinz Kiwitz
- Georg Petersdorff, long-time secretary of the Reichsbanner-Gaue Düsseldorf and Cologne
- Friedrich Senger
- Günther Strupp

== Other early concentration camps ==
- Breitenau concentration camp (1933–1934)
- Breslau-Dürrgoy concentration camp (Wrocław, Poland)
- Dachau concentration camp (March 1933 – 1945)
- Esterwegen concentration camp
- Hohnstein concentration camp
- Oranienburg concentration camp
- Sonnenburg concentration camp
- Vulkanwerft concentration camp (Bredow district of Stettin)

== See also ==
- Franz Gürtner
- Concentration Camps Inspectorate
- The Holocaust
- List of Nazi concentration camps
- Nazi concentration camps
- Lagerordnung
- World War II
