= Strupp =

Strupp is a surname. Notable people with the surname include:

- Günther Strupp (1912–1996), German artist
- Hans Strupp (1921–2006), German-American psychoanalyst
