= Vulkanwerft concentration camp =

Early camp in Nazi Germany (1933–34)

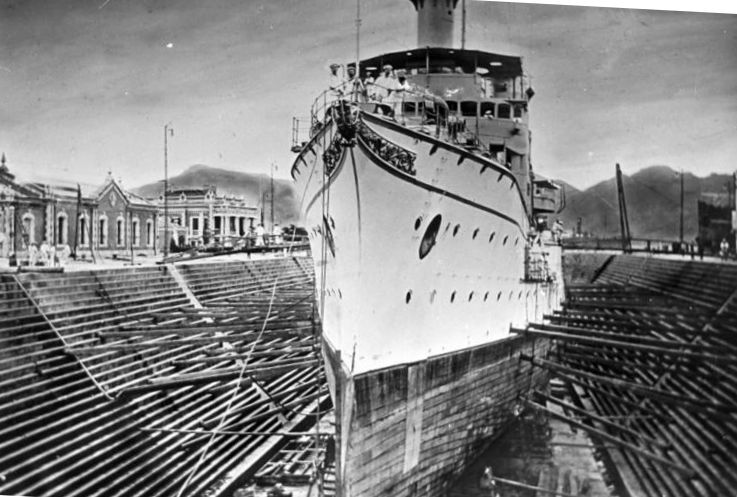
SMS Hansa II in the dock of the Vulkan Werft, Szczecin (Stettin)

Vulkanwerft concentration camp in the Bredow district of Szczecin (German: Stettin), also known as the KZ Stettin-Bredow, was one of the early so-called "wild" German Nazi concentration camps set up by the SA (or the SS by different source), in October 1933. The camp existed only until 11 March 1934, before prisoner transfer, and in spite of its short history, had as many as three commandants including SS-Truppführer Otto Meier, SS-Truppführer Karl Salis, and SS-Truppführer Fritz Pleines. The camp was notorious for the brutality of its guards. The prisoners were kept in the basement of the shipyard buildings. (Note: According to Encyclopedia of Camps and Ghettos, 1933–1945 published by the United States Holocaust Memorial Museum, the Stettin- Bredow [aka Vulkanwerft] concentration camp was one of 110 early Nazi German camps listed by name.)

Some of the prisoners had contacts capable of influencing the leadership. Former field marshal August von Mackensen wrote a letter to Hermann Göring, after which eight people, Joachim Hoffmann, Gustav Fink, Fritz Pleines, Willi Herrmann, Heinrich Richter and Walter Treptow, were arrested for torturing detainees. All of them were convicted "because out of pure sadism they had tortured their victims to the utmost in an inhumane manner," beyond what was necessary. Hoffmann was sentenced to 13 years in prison, Fink was sentenced to 10 years in prison, Herrmann received a 6-year sentence, Pleines and Salis each received 5-year sentences, Richter received a 2-year sentence, and Treptow received a 9-month sentence. Police officer Paul Grafunder was fined 300 Reichsmarks for trying to cover up the torture. The fine was considered paid via the time he had served in pre-trial custody.

On 30 June 1934, Hoffmann, Fink and Pleines were taken from prison and executed by firing squads composed of members of the SS Division Leibstandarte during the Night of the Long Knives.

== Other early concentration camps ==
- Breitenau concentration camp (1933–1934)
- Breslau-Dürrgoy concentration camp in Wrocław, Poland
- Esterwegen concentration camp
- Kemna concentration camp
- Oranienburg concentration camp
- Sonnenburg concentration camp

== See also ==
- List of Nazi concentration camps
- The United States Holocaust Memorial Museum Encyclopedia of Camps and Ghettos, 1933-1945, vol. 1
