= Breitenau concentration camp =

Concentration camp in Nazi Germany

Coordinates: 51°12′11″N 9°28′32″E

Breitenau concentration camp was one of the first concentration camps established by the Nazis. It was founded in June 1933 as an addition to the Breitenau Labor and Welfare House, less than six months after the Nazis had seized power in Germany. It closed in March 1934 and reopened in 1940 where it remained in operation until the end of World War II. In 1984, a memorial was constructed on the site of the former camp.

== History ==
In 1133, Benedictines founded a monastery at Breitenau. Philip I, Landgrave of Hesse converted the monastery to an estate in 1527. By 1579, it became a horse stable and warehouse for agricultural products. Between the early 17th and late 19th centuries, it mostly served as a country residence.

It was converted into a prison labor camp for beggars, vagabonds, and so-called "lewd women" in 1874. Three years later, an institution for the rural poor was established alongside the prison camp. Treatment at the prison was considered cruel with lengthy sentences and hard labor for minor criminal offenses, including poverty.

The Nazis converted the camp into a concentration camp for political prisoners in June 1933. It closed approximately nine months later in March 1934. During this time, the camp held political prisoners from Hesse and Thuringia, Germany.

In 1940, the camp reopened and served as a forced labor camp until 1945. This period marked a shift in which both Germans and foreigners were detained together. It is estimated that approximately 6,500 foreigners and 2,000–2,500 Germans were enslaved here.

== Breitenau Memorial ==
In 1984, a memorial was established in memory of those who were detained, enslaved, and murdered at the Breitenau concentration camp. It was built in a tithe barn that has been dated to the 15th century when it belonged to the original monastery. Compensation became available to survivors of the Breitenau concentration camp in 2000 with the memorial helping them apply for compensation.

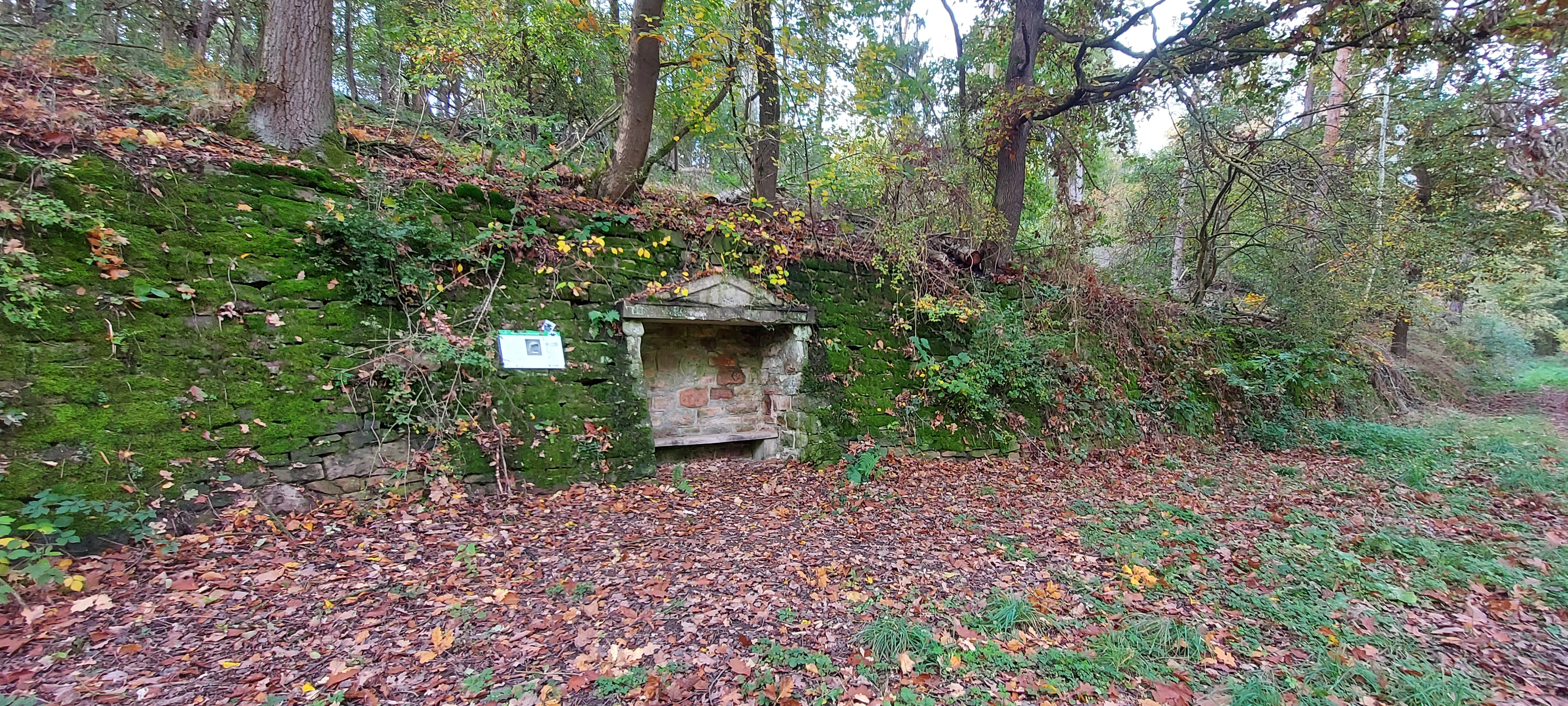
"Ehrenmal" built by the prisoners for the guards, later a plaque with historical context was installed

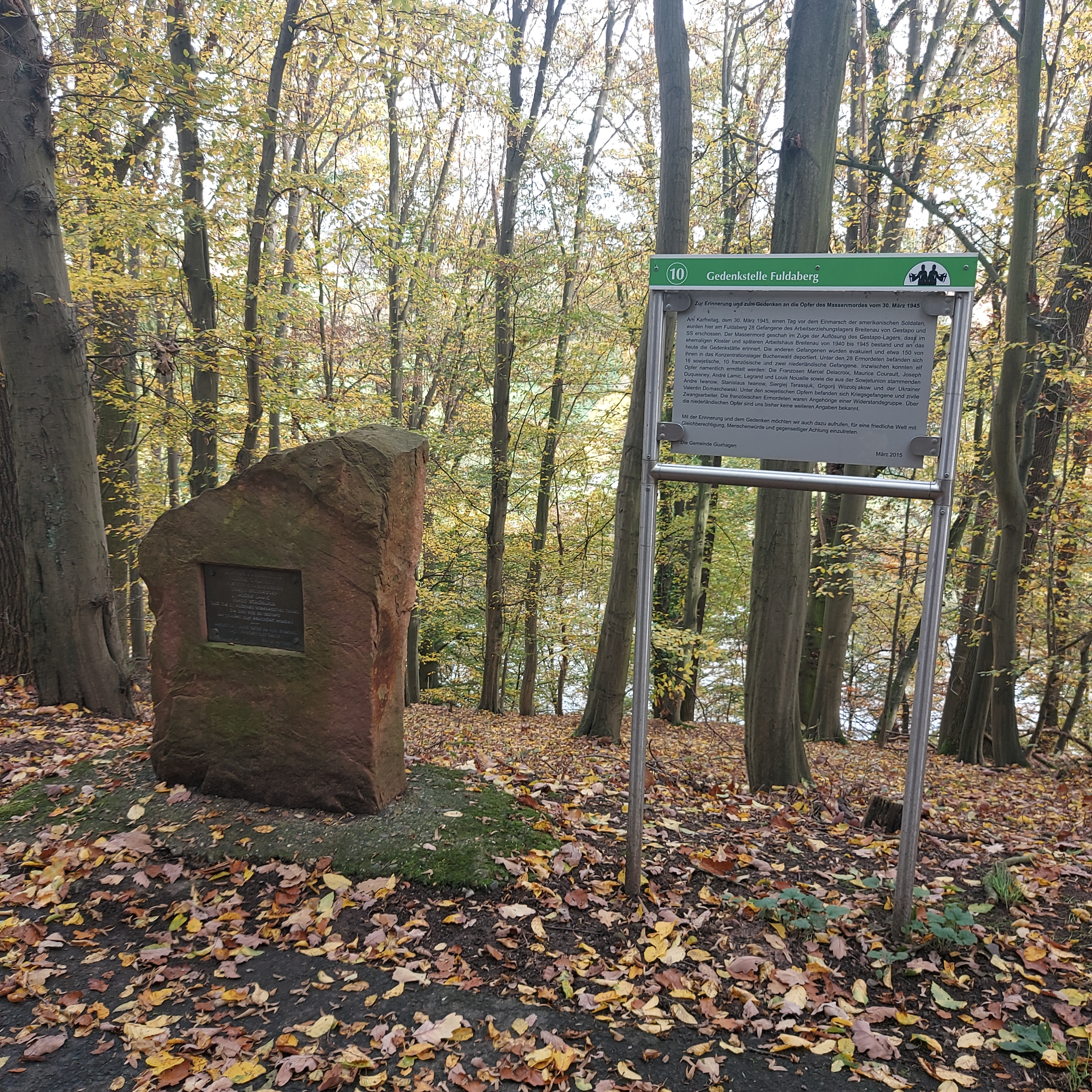
Memorial to the 28 victims in 1945

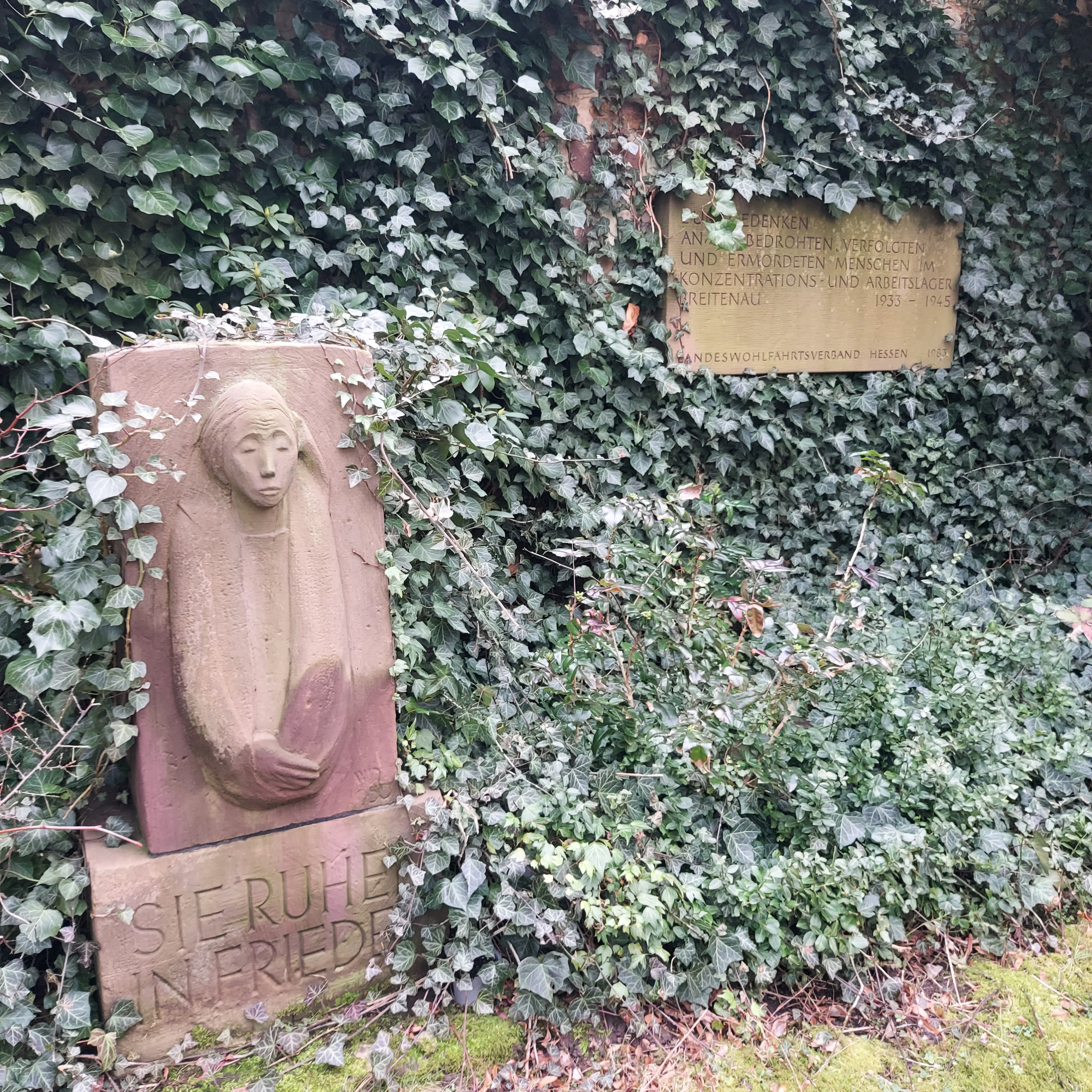
Memorial and plaque inside the monastery

== Other early concentration camps ==
- Breslau-Dürrgoy concentration camp in Wrocław, Poland
- Esterwegen concentration camp
- Kemna concentration camp
- Oranienburg concentration camp
- Sonnenburg concentration camp
- Vulkanwerft concentration camp in the Bredow district of Stettin

== See also ==
- The Holocaust
- List of concentration and internment camps
- List of Nazi concentration camps
- Nazi concentration camps
- Nazi Party
- World War II
- The United States Holocaust Memorial Museum Encyclopedia of Camps and Ghettos, 1933–1945, vol. 1
