= Karl Mache =

German politician (1880–1944)

Karl Mache (9 December 1880 – 19 October 1944) was a German politician (SPD). Between 1928 and 1930, he served as a member of the national parliament (Reichstag).

== Life ==
Karl Mache was born in Deutsch Lissa, then a small industrial town a short distance to the west of Breslau, as Wrocław was known until 1944/45. Very little is known of his early years. He attended junior and middle school in Breslau between 1886 and 1894. He trained for work in the bakery and confectionery sector and worked as a baker's assistant in various places in central Germany. He was also active in the trades union movement, serving as chairman of the Breslau branch of the Bakers' Association between 1900 and 1908. In 1901 Mache joined the Social Democratic Party ("Sozialdemokratische Partei Deutschlands" / SPD).

In 1909, he became a full-time trades union official, serving as the regional head of the Bakers' Association and based in Magdeburg till 1919, although for much of the time between 1914 and 1918 he was away from home due to the war in which he served as a soldier and as a result of which he was injured. After the war, he was briefly a city councillor in Magdeburg, before moving back to Breslau where he was based between 1919 and 1933 as a full-time SPD official, serving as regional party secretary for central and upper Silesia. At the same time, between February 1921 and 1933, he sat as a member of the regional parliament ("Provinziallandtag") for Lower Silesia. In Breslau, he also worked on an honorary basis (i.e. unpaid) for the workers' insurance organisation and was at one point chairman of the local health provision insurer ("Krankenkasse"). Between 1930 and 1933, he also served a deputy mayor of Breslau.

On the national stage, between May 1928 and September 1930 he sat as one of the 153 SPD members of the national parliament (Reichstag), representing electoral constituency 7 (Breslau).

In January 1933, the political context changed dramatically when the Nazi Party took power and, through the enabling act, began the process of establishing a one-party dictatorship. In the aftermath of the Reichstag fire, which took place at the end of February, the new government took the opportunity to arrest large numbers of people, including former Reichstag members who had represented left-wing parties. Mache was arrested in March 1933 and detained till December 1933. He was held at Dürrgoy and Lichtenburg concentration camps. He was re-arrested in August 1944, during the course of a mass round up of people with records of left-wing political activity, which came in the wake of a failed assassination attempt against Adolf Hitler, and taken to Gross-Rosen concentration camp. Here he died a couple of months later. According to the testimony of Paul Löbe, who was detained in the same concentration camp at the same time, the immediate cause of Karl Mache's death was a heart attack.
