= Oskar Hoffmann (politician) =

German politician (1877–1953)

Oskar Hoffmann (4 July 1877 – 3 February 1953) was a German editor and politician. He served in the Landtag in North Rhine-Westphalia and was a member of the Social Democratic Party of Germany. After the war, he became a member of the Communist Party. He was arrested in 1933 and for one month, was held at Kemna concentration camp, where he was tortured physically and psychologically.

== Sources ==
- Kurt Schnöring, "Oskar Hoffmann" in: Wuppertaler Biographien. 14. Folge, Wuppertal (Born) 1984, ISBN 3-87093-035-7 (in German)
