= Josef Breitenbach =

American painter

Josef Breitenbach (April 3, 1896, in Munich, Germany – October 7, 1984, in New York City, USA) was a photographer whose manipulated images and stark photographs were part of the Surrealistic movement.

== Early life ==
Josef Breitenbach was born into a middle-class wine-merchant Jewish family, and came of age during the chaotic years of the First World War and its troubled aftermath. He attended technical high school from 1912 to 1915 and trained as a salesman for an instrument firm and later as a bookkeeper for an insurance firm. He attended the Ludwig-Maximilians-Universität München (philosophy and art history, 1914 to 1917) and became active in the Youth Section and later the Pacifist wing of the Social Democratic Party. In 1918, he took part in the Soviet-inspired Bavarian coup d’état, which was the first spark of the revolutionary fire that swept over Germany in the wake of the armistice. For a few months, Breitenbach also occupied an official position in the new government. Although the revolution was short-lived, the ties he forged with the radical circles of Munich's intelligentsia later helped him establish his reputation as a photographer.

In 1932, after several unsuccessful years at the head of the family business—during which period he was mainly engaged with perfecting his use of a camera—Breitenbach opened his first photographic studio. His clients were prominent members of Munich's bohemia, including actors and actresses performing in the Munich theater. Munich was a stronghold of libertarians and refined peoples, whose spirit Breitenbach captured in theatrical portraits of his friend, the journalist Theo Riegler. This world vanished in 1933 with Hitler's takeover.

== War Years ==
More than his Jewish roots, the photographer's political past and the active anti-Nazi activity of his teenage son, Hans, made them a target for persecution. In early 1934 a band of Sturmabteilung (SA) storm troopers, members of Hitler's private army, banged on the door of Josef's studio looking for Hans. Using a portrait of German nobleman Franz von Papen he'd taken the year before when he was Chancellor of Germany, and a letter of thanks he'd received, Breitenbach convinced the troopers that he was under Papen's protection. With his passport about to expire, Breitenbach made his way to France a few days later, joining other German exiles seeking refuge in Paris.

The Surrealist “revolution” had by then become dominant in the Parisian art scene. Soon after his arrival, Breitenbach came into contact with André Breton and his circle. Preferring to retain his independence, he never became a member of the Surrealist group, but did show work in important exhibitions of Surrealist photography alongside Man Ray, Jacques-André Boiffard, Brassaï, Eli Lotar, Henri Cartier-Bresson, and Roger Parry.

Breitenbach only lived in Paris for six years, until the war broke out in 1939. Yet during this period, he produced some of his most inventive work. He adopted several techniques favored by new photographers such as superimpression, montage, solarization, printing in negative, and the photogram. More importantly, he was one of the rare artists of the pre-War years to produce color photographs. Examples are the images Montparnasse, Portrait of a Woman in Black and Red, and Forever and Ever. However, these prints are not in color, but colors, using processes of bleaching, toning, and pigment.

Also during his years in Paris, he was an active member of the German exile community, which alerted the democratic world to the threat of fascism. He participated in the 1938 exhibition by the Union des Artistes Allemands Libres, "Five Years of Hitler Dictatorship". A high point for Breitenbach was his collaboration with Bertolt Brecht, summarized by portraits of the playwright. The war interrupted this second chapter of the photographer's life. Interned by the French as a suspicious alien, then drafted into a civilian corps composed of foreigners, Breitenbach eventually escaped to New York from Marseille in 1941.

Cover photo for Josef Breitenbach Photographien, titled "Dr.Riegler and J.Greno" (Riegler was Breitenbach's best friend)

== New Life in America ==
Breitenbach seemingly had no trouble adjusting to America. New York, the city in which he would spend the rest of his life, became home to him, as evidenced by his photomontage of 1942, "We New Yorkers." He responded to the electric beat of the city, composing photographs such as "Radio City" (1942) that have a jazz-like quality.

His first teaching appointment was at Black Mountain College near Asheville, North Carolina, where he was invited by Josef Albers to teach as Visiting Instructor in photography in summer 1944. In New York City, he taught at Cooper Union from 1946 to 1966 and the New School for Social Research from 1949 to 1975.

The 1950s and 1960s were years of intense activity for Breitenbach. He did photographic reportage in Asia for the United Nations and other varied businesses, documenting relief work. He exhibited his photographs extensively in Europe in the 1930s (especially in Paris) and in the United States from the 1940s to the mid-1960s, including at the Museum of Modern Art and the Metropolitan Museum of Art, where he had work selected by Edward Steichen for the museum's international touring exhibition The Family of Man. The time not spent on the road was spent absorbed by his teaching at Cooper Union and The New School.

== After life ==
Since his death, there have been 26 one-person exhibitions of his work, shown New York, Paris, Berlin, Munich, and multiple other locations in both Europe in the United States. Eight books have been published on his work, including two by Larissa Dryansky (Josef Breitenbach and Josef Breitenbach Manifesto) and Josef Breitenbach Photographien, published by Schirmer/Mosel. The Josef Breitenbach archive is located at the Center for Creative Photography at the University of Arizona, Tucson.

== Publications ==
- BREITENBACH, Josef, DERENTHAL, Ludger, GEORGE, Kelly, HALFBRODT, Dirk, IMMISCH, T. O., JONES, Peter C., POHLMANN, Ulrich, TIEDE, Marcia. Josef Breitenbach Photographien. München; Paris; London: Schirmer/Mosel, 1996. Print.
- Dryansky, Larisa. Josef Breitenbach. Paris: les Éditions de l'Amateur and musée Nicéphonre Niépce, 2001. Print.
- Dryansky, Larisa. Josef Breitenbach Manifesto. Portland: Nazraeli Press, 2008. Print
