= Theodor Steltzer =

German politician (1885–1867)

Minister-president, Schleswig-Holstein
- In office 23 August 1946 – 29 April 1947
- Preceded by: Position established
- Succeeded by: Hermann Lüdemann

Oberpräsident, Province of Schleswig-Holstein
- In office 15 November 1945 – 34 August 1946
- Preceded by: Otto Hoevermann
- Succeeded by: Position abolished

Landrat, Rendsburg district
- In office 1 October 1945 – 15 November 1945
- In office 1 September 1920 – early 1933

Additional positions
- 1946–1947: Landtag of Schleswig-Holstein Deputy

Personal details
- Born: 17 December 1885 Trittau, Province of Schleswig-Holstein, Kingdom of Prussia, German Empire
- Died: 27 October 1967 (aged 81) Munich, Bavaria, West Germany
- Party: Christian Democratic Union of Germany
- Education: Ludwig-Maximilians-Universität München
- Occupation: Military officer

Military service
- Allegiance: German Empire
- Branch/service: Royal Prussian Army
- Years of service: 1904–1918
- Battles/wars: World War I

Theodor Hans Friedrich Steltzer (17 December 1885 – 27 October 1967) was a Prussian military officer and civil servant during the German Empire and the Weimar Republic. He was removed from office and prosecuted by the Nazis in 1933. Conscripted into the Wehrmacht during World War II, he became active in the German resistance to Nazism by joining the Kreisau Circle. After the failed plot to assassinate Adolf Hitler in July 1944, Steltzer was arrested and condemned to death in early 1945. Despite this, he survived the war, became a politician in the Christian Democratic Union of Germany and served as the first minister-president of Schleswig-Holstein from 1946 to 1947. After leaving office, he was active in several organizations dealing with public and international affairs.

== Early life and military service in the German Empire ==
Steltzer was born in Trittau in Schleswig-Holstein. After earning his Abitur from the Johanneum in Lüneburg in 1902, he joined the Royal Prussian Army as an officer cadet in April 1904. In 1907, he took a leave of absence to study political science at the Ludwig-Maximilians-Universität München, but in 1909, he resumed his military career as a battalion adjutant in Göttingen. From 1912 to 1914, he attended the Prussian War College in Berlin. After the outbreak of World War I, he was initially deployed near Liège and then transferred to the eastern front where he was severely wounded on 31 December 1914. After recovering from his wounds, he resumed service on the staff of the Field Railway Service in Charleville-Mézières in 1915. In 1917, he became a general staff officer with the Field Railway Service at the Oberste Heeresleitung (supreme army command).

== Civil service career in the Weimar Republic ==
After leaving military service at the end of the war, Steltzer entered the Prussian civil service. On 1 September 1920, he was appointed the acting Landrat (district administrator) for the Rendsburg district in Schleswig, an appointment made permanent on 1 February 1921. A capable administrator, he served as an impartial technocrat for the next twelve years, and joined no political party.

== Persecution by Nazi Germany, war service and resistance activity ==
Following the Nazi seizure of power in 1933, Steltzer was removed from office and charged with breach of trust and treason. He was held in pre-trial detention at Kiel for eight months before the charges were dropped, but he was not allowed to return to the civil service. There followed a series of short duration jobs, first with the Association for German Culture Abroad in Berlin, and from 1936 to 1939 in Marburg and Hamburg as secretary of the Evangelische Michaelsbruderschaft.

After the outbreak of World War II, Steltzer was conscripted into the Wehrmacht and posted as a transport officer in Poland and subsequently as a staff officer in Bonn. Transferred to the staff of the Wehrmacht commander in Norway at Oslo on 1 August 1940, he made contacts with the Norwegian resistance movement and helped warn some Norwegian Jews to escape to neutral Sweden in 1941. During this time, Steltzer also established connections with the Kreisau Circle, part of the German resistance movement headed by Helmuth James von Moltke. After the failed 20 July 1944 assassination attempt on Adolf Hitler, Steltzer was arrested in August and was sentenced to death by the People's Court on 15 January 1945. The intervention of Finnish and Swedish contacts secured a postponement of his execution and Steltzer was released from custody on 24 April 1945, just two weeks before Germany's surrender.

== Post-war resumption of political activity ==
After the end of the war, Steltzer was among the co-founders of the Christian Democratic Union (CDU) in Berlin in June 1945. After his return to Schleswig-Holstein in the autumn of 1945, he was also among the co-founders of the CDU there and was provisionally appointed district administrator in Rendsburg by the British occupational authorities on 1 October. This was followed on 15 November by his appointment as the Oberpräsident of the province of Schleswig-Holstein and he was charged with establishing the provincial administration. After the federal state of Schleswig-Holstein was established, he was appointed its first minister-president by the British on 23 August 1946. Following the victory of the Social Democratic Party (SPD) in the election to the first Landtag of Schleswig-Holstein in April 1947, Steltzer resigned on 29 April and was succeeded by Hermann Lüdemann of the SPD. Steltzer sat as a CDU deputy in the Landtag from 26 February 1946 to 22 May 1947.

In 1947 and 1948, Steltzer participated in meetings of the Gesellschaft Imshausen, a think-tank of some forty politicians, writers and intellectuals across the entire political spectrum, who advocated for a fundamental reorganization of Germany based on the spirit of the resistance movement. From 1950 to 1952, he headed the Institute for the Promotion of Public Affairs in Frankfurt am Main. From 1955 to 1960, he served as president of the German Commission for UNESCO and on the German Council on Foreign Relations, which he had co-founded. Steltzer died at Munich in October 1967.

== See also ==
- Anti-Nazi activity in Norway by Stelzer during World War II
