= Union des Artistes Allemands Libres =

The Union des Artistes Allemands Libres was a federation of exiled German artists living in Paris, France, after the collapse of the Weimar Republic and the establishment of the Third Reich after the Nazis seized power. It was founded in autumn 1937 as the Union of Artistes Allemands (Union of German Artists, or Freier Künstlerbund in German) and adding the French word for "free", was later called the Union des Artistes Libres Allemands and then the Union des Artistes Allemands Libres. In spring 1938, it became the Union des Artistes Libres.

Some of the Union's members were defamed in the Nazis' Entartete Kunst exhibit. In 1938, the Union organized an exhibit called Cinq Ans de Dictateure Hitlerienne ("Five Years of Hitler Dictatorship") that was held in a trade union building. Josef Breitenbach participated in the show. Members of the Union included Max Ernst, Otto Freundlich, Hans Hartung, Heinz Kiwitz and Gert Wollheim, who was a co-founder.

The Union published Freie Kunst und Literatur, a newsletter that was later taken over by the Cartel Cultural Allemand, also founded in Paris.
