= Nohra concentration camp =

Nazi concentration camp

Nohra
- Nazi concentration camp
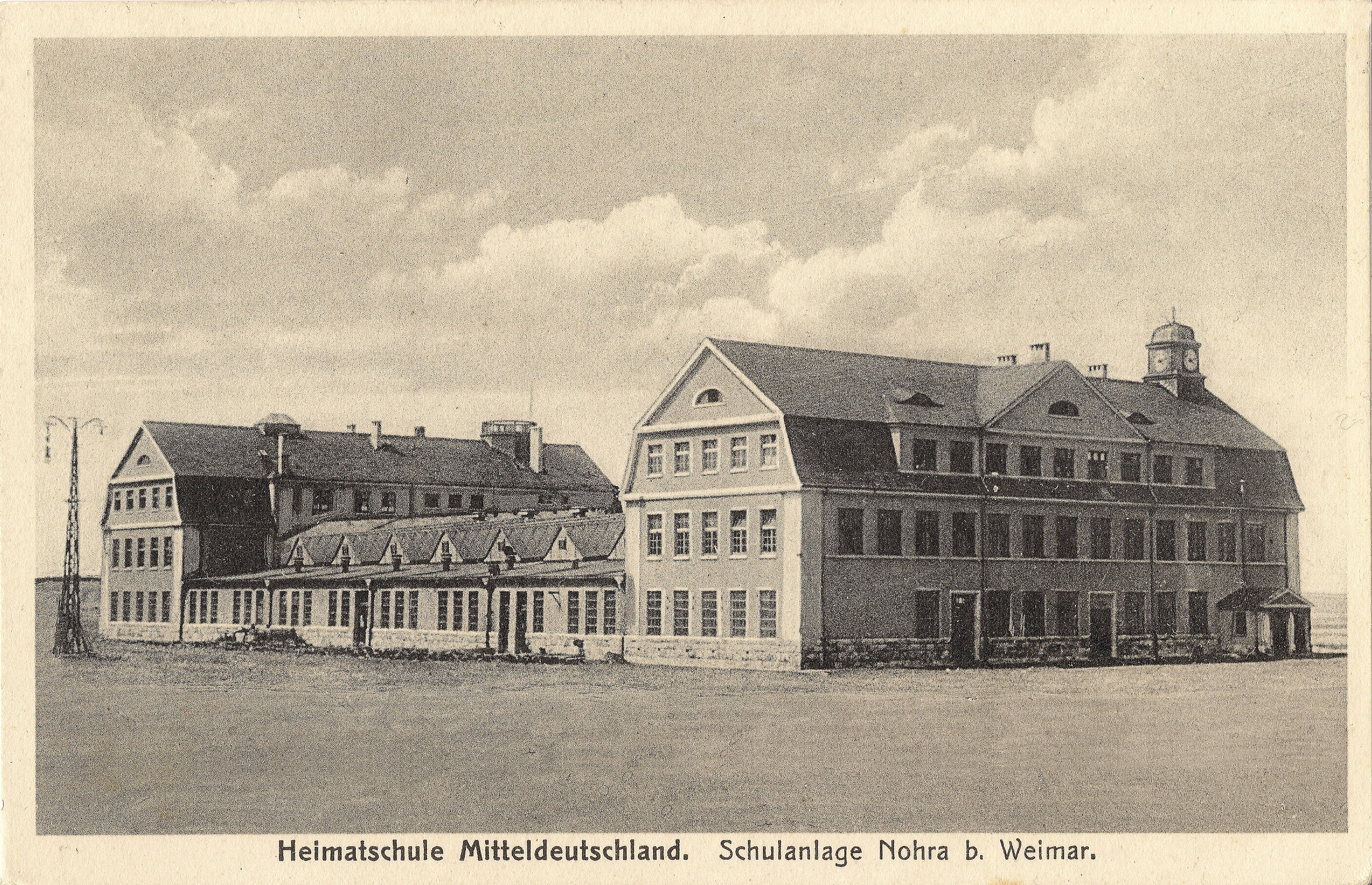
- Heimatschule Mitteldeutschland at Nohra, later site of the concentration camp
- Coordinates: 50°58′05″N 11°14′44″E
- Known for: first Nazi concentration camp
- Location: Nohra, Germany
- Operated by: Thuringia interior ministry
- Original use: school, airfield
- Operational: 1933
- Inmates: Communists
- Number of inmates: 250

Nohra was the first of the early Nazi concentration camps in Germany, established 3 March 1933 in a school at an airfield in Nohra. The camp was administered by the interior ministry of Thuringia. The inmates were exclusively communists and included half of the Communist party group in the Thuringian state parliament. Prisoners were not forced to work or systematically abused, but had to suffer from poor hygienic conditions and did not have beds. The camp was closed down after a few months, and the building was demolished in the 1950s. A plaque commemorating the camp was installed in 1988 but taken down in 1990; as of 2023 there is no memorial board for the camp.

== Background ==
The Nazi party had been part of the Thuringia state government since 1930, when Wilhelm Frick was appointed interior minister. In the 1932 state elections, the Nazis won a plurality of the votes and formed a coalition government under Fritz Sauckel, who also served as interior minister. On 28 February 1933, a Thuringian Hilfspolizei (auxiliary police) unit under Sauckel's command was formed, with unit members recruited from SA, SS and the Stahlhelm veteran association. After the 27 February 1933 Reichstag fire, hundreds of Communist Party of Germany members were arrested. To reduce overcrowding in the prisons, the interior ministry of Thuringia decided to open additional camps, called assembly camps (Sammellager), and the first such camp was opened on 3 March 1933 in Nohra, close to Weimar. On the same day, 100 prisoners arrived from various police stations and prisons nearby. Many of the prisoners came from Thuringia's socialist-leaning industrial cities. By the second day the population reached 170 and around 12 March it reached its peak of 220 prisoners. Many additional arrests took place after the election on 5 March. From 8 March 1933, the camp was described as a concentration camp.

== Site ==
The camp was located at the Nohra airfield in a World War I era building that consisted of two barracks connected by a low-rise hall for aeroplanes. The building was close enough to the later Buchenwald concentration camp that the bell tower of the latter is visible from the site. From 1928, the site was used to house the Heimatschule Mitteldeutschland, a right-wing military school for young men. The school offered mostly holiday camps combining military sports with national-conservative political education. Between 1928 and 1931, 1119 young men, no older than 15, took part in the activities at the school. Additionally on site were a volunteer work camp of the Freiwilliger Arbeitsdienst and a military sports camp of the Stahlhelm association. Advantages of the site were the supportive local ideology, the presence of suitable buildings and the presence of Schutzpolizei in nearby Weimar.

The concentration camp was located on the second floor of one of the buildings, and divided into three large rooms, furnished only with straw and blankets. In particular, there were no beds. There were no fences or barbed wire, and the site was comparatively freely accessible.

== Administration and guards ==
Unlike most of the later concentration camps, Nohra was not administered by the SA or SS, but by the Thuringia interior ministry. Heimatschule students were employed as additional guards. A police station was set up in the school building where newcomers were interrogated. The commander of the station lived in a villa close by, still called Kommandantenvilla locally that was used as a Gasthaus as of 2003.

== Prisoners and camp life ==
All prisoners were Thuringian communists. Half of the Communist party (KPD) group in the Thuringian state parliament was imprisoned at Nohra, the five politicians Rudolf Arnold, Richard Eyermann, Fritz Gäbler, Leander Kröber and Erich Scharf. Other prisoners included the KPO member Werner Klinz and the former KPD member of parliament Hermann Steudner. The prisoners did not work, but spent the entire day in the halls where they slept, with only interrogations and new arrivals interrupting the monotony. There was no systematic abuse by the guards, but the hygiene conditions were very poor, especially as the camp was sometimes very crowded. The inmate Fritz Koch, a functionary of the paramilitary Roter Frontkämpferbund, died on 17 March 1933 in a Weimar hospital from a tooth infection caught at the camp; his was the only death related to the Nohra concentration camp. Occupancy of the camp averaged at 95, with a maximum of 220. In total, about 250 prisoners were interned at Nohra until the camp was closed. For a short time, some women were also held at the camp.

The Nohra inmates were allowed to vote in the March 1933 German federal election, and their presence caused a significant rise in the communist vote in Nohra (172 in March 1933 versus 10 in the December 1932 local elections). Prisoners who were released had to sign a statement that they would refrain from future political engagement.

== Closure and legacy ==
Nohra was among the first concentration camps that were closed down. The closing date has been reported to be 12 April 1933 or 10 May 1933. Any remaining prisoners were moved to a prison in Ichtershausen. In October 1933, some of them, including Eyermann and Kröber, were moved to Bad Sulza concentration camp in nearby Bad Sulza.

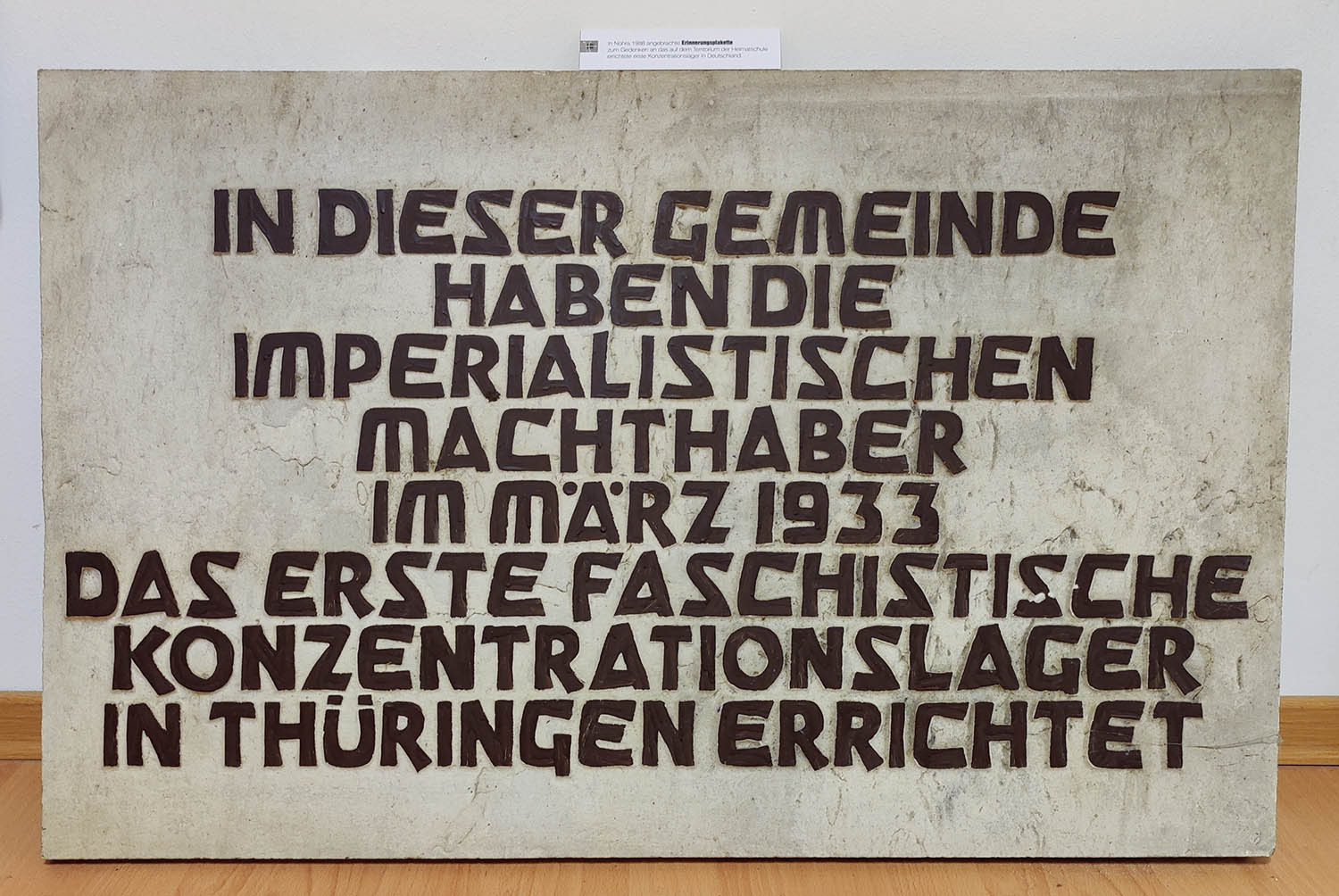
Commemorative plaque installed by the SED district leadership in Nohra in 1988. On display in a museum in Ulla.

The Heimatschule was closed in October 1933. From 1935, the camp site was used by the Luftwaffe, who added some barracks and further buildings. The barracks were used by the Red Army after the end of World War II. In 1946, the government of Thuringia considered moving their administration offices to the site of the Nohra airfield, but this was not accepted by the Soviet occupying authorities. The building that had housed the camp was demolished in the early 1950s. In 1988, the Weimar district Socialist Unity Party of Germany ordered the installation of a memorial plaque for the concentration camp in Nohra. The plaque read In dieser Gemeinde haben die imperialistischen Machthaber im März 1933 das erste faschistische Konzentrationslager in Thüringen errichtet. ('In this municipality, the imperialist rulers set up the first fascist concentration camp in Thuringia in March 1933') After German reunification, the plaque was moved to the town hall attic in 1990, and there was no local indication of the existence of the camp in the early 2000s. In the 2010s, a local history club was working on having memorial boards installed. This has not happened as of 2023.
