= Günther Strupp =

Woodcut by Günther Strupp depicting Kemna concentration camp

Günther Strupp (March 6, 1912 – 1996) was a German artist, illustrator, and art director. He was a survivor of Kemna concentration camp and of Gestapo imprisonment in Stadelheim Prison.

== Life and work ==
Strupp was born in Johannisburg in Masuria, now part of Poland. He grew up in Duisburg and in 1930, began studying art in Essen at the Folkwangschule with his long-time friend Heinz Kiwitz. In 1931, Kiwitz and Strupp went to Cologne for a few months. He studied at the Folkwangschule until 1933.

Strupp joined the Communist Party, which led to his arrest in 1933 after the Nazis seized power. He was held at Kemna concentration camp for several months, an experience he later depicted in an illustration. Kiwitz was also arrested and placed in Kemna, but was later transferred to another concentration camp. After his release in 1933, he fled to Paris, where he stayed until 1936. In 1940, he applied for work building stage sets at several theaters in Berlin and with the help of Wilhelm Fraenger, found work painting scenery at the Schiller Theater. Fraenger also commissioned Strupp to illustrate Ludwig Tieck's Merkwürdige Lebensgeschichte Sr. Majestät Abraham Tonelli, but its publication was forbidden by the Reichskulturkammer. It was eventually published after the war.

Strupp went to Augsburg, hoping it would be a safer place for him to live than Duisburg, but was swept up by the Gestapo in the wave of arrests after the July 20 plot to kill Hitler. The 1944 arrest carried an increased chance of a trial before the Third Reich's People's Court. Strupp was liberated from Stadelheim Prison by American troops on May 1, 1945.

After World War II, Strupp was put up in the Holbein Haus in Augsburg and given a job as an "upgraded" building superintendent, as he phrased it. He then became a contributor to the postwar German satirical magazine, Ulenspiegel, founded by two other survivors of Nazi detention, Herbert Sandberg and Günther Weisenborn. During the 1950s and 1960s, he also worked on several film productions. He corresponded with Bertolt Brecht. In 1962, he received Augsburg's art award for pictorial art.

Strupp received several awards in his lifetime.

== Exhibits ==
- Ausstellung Heinz Kiwitz, Günther Strupp, Galerie Oberstenfeld, Duisburg (September 27 – October 26, 1947)
- Günther Strupp: Tempera- und Ölbilder, Zeichnungen 1930-1960, Cologne Kunstverein (July 30 – August 28, 1960)
- Drei Generationen Strupp, Temporäre Galerie, Munich 2004 (including works by his son Peter and his granddaughter Sabina Sakoh, née Niederkofler)

== Books ==
- Ludwig Tieck, Günther Strupp, Merkwürdige Lebensgeschichte Sr. Majestät Abraham Tonelli, W. Rau (1947)
- Günther Strupp, So leben wir!: Pelztiere belauscht, RIFRA-Verlag (1954)
- Malerei und Graphik von Günther Strupp, 1930 bis 1960, Verlag Die Brigg (1961)
- Jella Lepman, Hansjörg Schmitthenner, Günther Strupp, * Die schönsten Gute Nacht Geschichten, Ullstein (1964)
- Günther Strupp, Der Nachtwächter vom Holbein-Haus, Verlag Die Brigg (1967)
- Henryk Keisch, Struppzeug. Die kuriose, unheile Bilderwelt des Günther Strupp, Eulenspiegel Verlag (1970)
- Herbert Sandberg, Günther Strupp, Günther Strupp 70 Jahre (1982)

== Animation and film ==
- Der Apfel ist ab (1948), assistant production designer
- Schneeweisschen und Rosenrot (1955), art director
- Hänsel und Gretel (1954)
- Rotkäppchen (1954), set decoration
- Schneewittchen und die sieben Zwerge (1955), set decoration
