= Gustav Winckler (jurist) =

German jurist

Gustav Winckler (22 April 1897 – 19 December 1980) was a German jurist. The son of a Lutheran minister, he became a member of the Nazi Party, but in the early 1930s, pursued claims of torture and abuse at Kemna concentration camp, which brought threats against his life. After World War II, he was contacted by people trying to bring the case to trial and he joined their efforts, which in 1948, resulted in a number of convictions.
