= Karl Ibach =

German resister to Nazism

Karl Ibach (April 3, 1915 – May 3, 1990) was a German member of the resistance against the Third Reich and later, a writer and politician.

== Biographical details ==
Ibach was born in Elberfeld, today part of Wuppertal, Germany. At the age of 16, he joined the Young Communist League and later, the Communist Party (Kommunistische Partei Deutschlands or KPD). He had planned to become a bookseller, but in spring 1933, was arrested and detained at the Kemna concentration camp in Wuppertal, becoming one of the youngest prisoners at the age of 18. (Note: Another teenager, Willi Schubäus, was 17.) He spent 74 days at Kemna and was not tortured. Ibach was apparently seen by the SA guards as having been a misguided teenager and was allowed to work in the camp administration office. He was released in October 1933, when the SA released a large number of prisoners.

He continued his resistance activities, fleeing to the Netherlands, but was arrested again shortly after returning to Germany. He was charged with suspicion of preparing to commit high treason and was convicted in Hamm to an 8-year sentence in a Zuchthaus. Until 1943, he was imprisoned in Nazi concentration camps and Zuchthouses, in Esterwegen, Börgermoor and Zuchthaus Waldheim. In 1943, he was transferred to Lager Heuberg and Punishment Division 999, where he was drilled for later military deployment to the front to defend the Third Reich. In 1944, Ibach became a Soviet prisoner of war and was released in 1947. In 1948, Ibach published a report about his experiences at Kemna. For more than three decades, his and Willi Weiler's published reports were the only published sources of information about the history of the regional concentration camp system.

Karl Ibach was a co-founder and director of the Union of Persecutees of the Nazi Regime. From 1950 to 1971, he was the director of the state branch. From 1954 to 1969, he was the vice chairman of the Zentralverband demokratischer Widerstandskämpfer- und Verfolgtenorganisationen (Central Association of Democratic Resistance Fighters and Persecuted Organizations) and a member of the presidium of the Fédération Internationale Libre des Déportés et Internés de la Résistance (Free International Federation of Deportees and Internees of the Resistance) in the Barmen neighborhood of Wuppertal. He became a member of the Social Democratic Party in 1957 and supervised the electoral district 76, Landesliste North Rhine-Westphalia from 1957 to 1980.

== Recognition and honors ==
Ibach's book was republished in 1980 with a foreword by Johannes Rau, then Minister-President of North Rhine-Westphalia and later President of Germany, who was from Wuppertal.

In 1985, Ibach was awarded the Honorary Ring of the city of Wuppertal. The street above Beyenburger Straße in Wuppertal, across from the former grounds of Kemna concentration camp is named after Karl Ibach and is the location of the memorial for the camp.

== Sources ==
- Peter Steinbach, Karl Ibach. Zur Biographie eines Widerstandskämpfers, Wissenschaftsverlag Richard Rothe, Passau 1990
- Karl Ibach, Kemna: Wuppertaler Konzentrationslager 1933–1934, Peter Hammer Verlag, Erstauflage 1948, Wuppertal
