= Protective custody (Nazi Germany) =

Extra- or para-legal rounding-up of political opponents

Protective custody (German: Schutzhaft) was the extra- or para-legal rounding-up of political opponents, Jews, and other persecuted groups in Nazi Germany. It was sometimes officially defended as necessary to protect them from the "righteous" wrath of the German population. In other cases, such as homosexuals, it was considered necessary to protect the German "volk" from their influence. Schutzhaft did not provide for a judicial warrant; in fact, detainees never saw a judge.

In providing for the detainment and "relocation" of those taken into Schutzhaft, no documentation was provided. It was considered different from a normal judicial action and did not require warrant or prior notice.

Those arrested were sent to concentration camps such as Dachau or Buchenwald. Hitler authorized Heinrich Himmler to manage this system in late March of 1933, after reportedly being impressed with Dachau concentration camp, the first concentration camp built by the SS. Before this the concentration camp system was managed in an ad-hoc manner with multiple different authorities running Wild Concentration Camps.
