= Breslau-Dürrgoy concentration camp =

Short-lived Nazi German concentration camp

Coordinates: 51.0731°N 17.0508°E

- Concentration camp
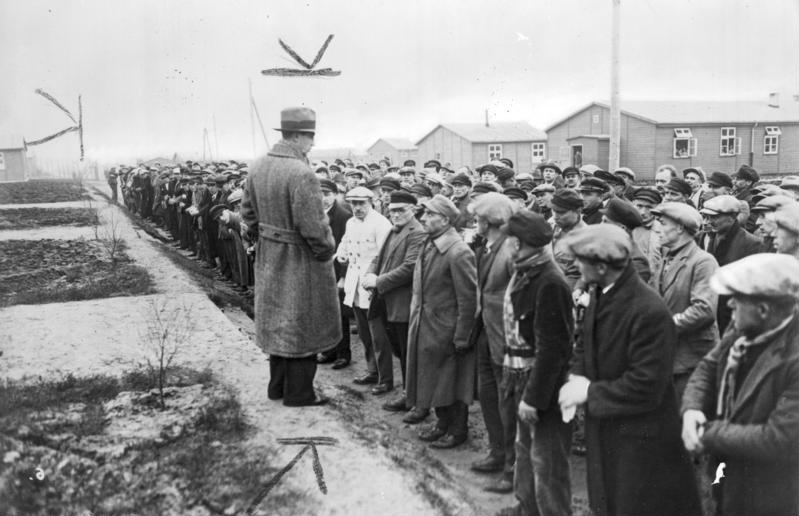
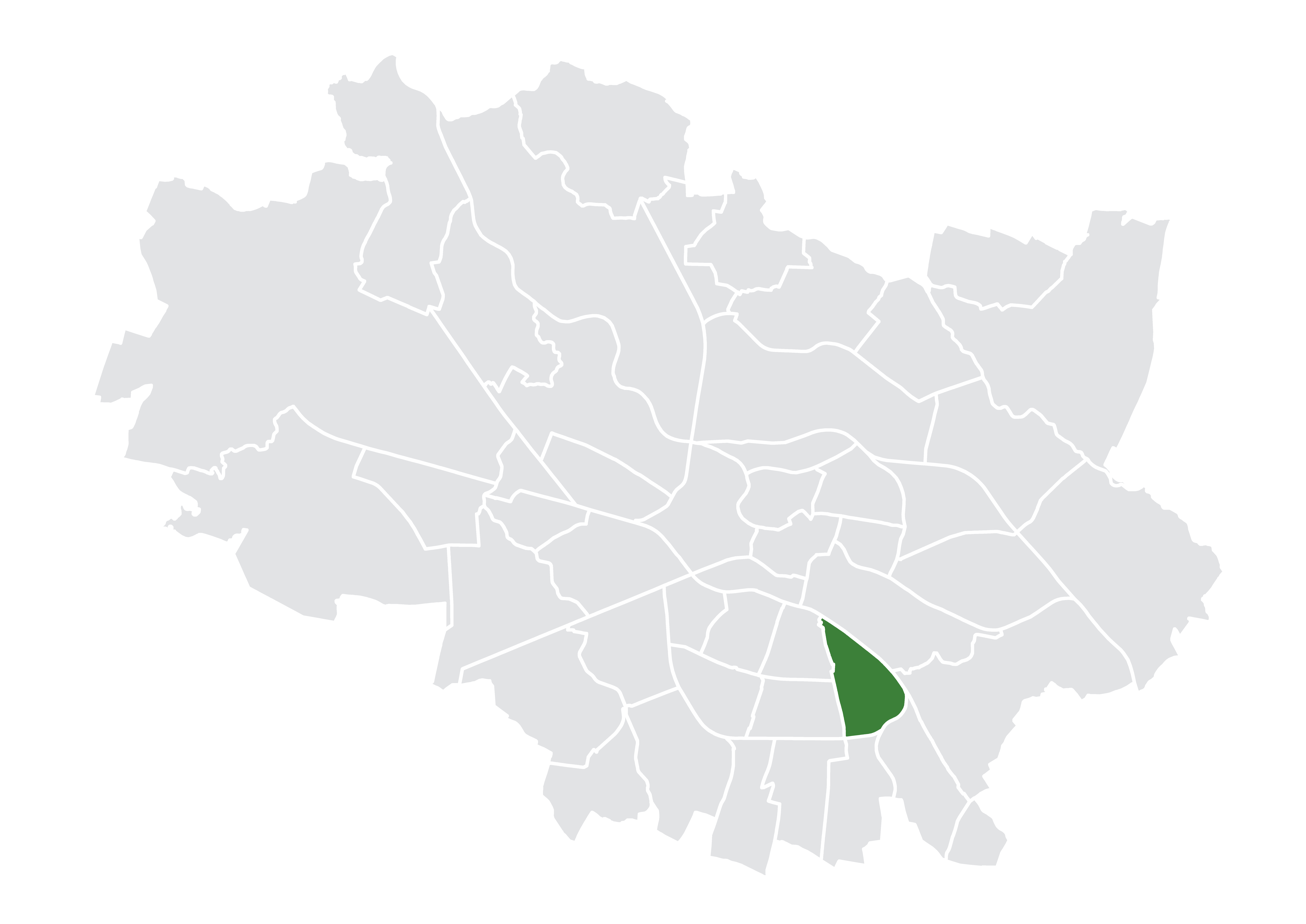
- Pictured KZ Esterwegen where prisoners of KZ Dürrgoy have been transferred in 1933 The location of the old Dürrgoy neighbourhood (Polish: Tarnogaj) on the modern-day map of Wrocław
- Known for: Imprisonment, forced labor
- Location: Wrocław, (German: Breslau)

Breslau-Dürrgoy concentration camp or KZ Dürrgoy was a short-lived Nazi German concentration camp set up in the southern part of Wrocław (German: Breslau), then in Germany, before World War II on the grounds of the old fertilizer factory "Silesia". It was located in what, since 1945, has become known as the Tarnogaj neighbourhood of Wrocław (German: Dürrgoy), at the Strehlener Chaussee or Strzeliński Street (today ul. Bardzka), opposite the cemetery of the Holy Spirit. The camp, intended for the opponents of Nazism, was established at a place of the former POW camp for French prisoners of World War I, converted and utilized by the fertilizer factory. The new camp was founded on the initiative of the commander of SA in Silesia, SA-Obergruppenführer Edmund Heines, on 12 March 1933, and liquidated on 10 August 1933 with all prisoners transported to a larger concentration camp at Osnabrück.

== History ==
Initially, around 200 people were sent to the camp, followed by more arrests and confinement. Overall, between eight hundred and one thousand prisoners were kept in the camp, including Social Democrats, Communists ( KPD ) and Jews. Among the prisoners in Dürrgoy were Hermann Lüdemann (president of Lower Silesia), Fritz Voigt (former president of the police in Wrocław, SPD), Karl Mache (Deputy Mayor of Breslau, as the city was known at that time), Wilhelm Winzer (former city councilor Wrocław, SPD), Paul Löbe (President of the Reichstag, SPD) and Ernst Eckstein (SPD activist). The prisoners worked in a nearby chemical plant "Silesia", which no longer exists.

The camp was one of the so-called "wild" concentration camps, one of many created at that time in Germany. They were organized mostly in temporary barracks or railway cars using low cost materials available on the site. Setting up the Dürrgoy camp only took two weeks. The existence of 'wild' camps, and the treatment of prisoners detained in them, became public relatively quickly, and under pressure from public opinion they were shut down. The result was a centralization of the system of repression and the transfer of prisoners to official camps.

KZ Dürrgoy closed on 10 August 1933, and the last 343 prisoners were transported by train to a special camp Esterwegen, located near Osnabrück. The barracks which remained in the camp furnished shelter for the homeless.

Today on the site of the camp and the factory "Silesia" is a landfill waste management site of Wzgórze Gajowe ("Gamekeeper Hill"), created after the Second World War.

== See also ==
- Glossary of Nazi Germany
- The Holocaust
- List of books about Nazi Germany
- List of concentration and internment camps
- List of Nazi-German concentration camps
- Nazi concentration camps
- Nazi Party
- Nazi songs
- World War II
