= Register of SS leaders in general's rank =

This register of SS leaders in general's rank includes the members of the Allgemeine SS and Waffen-SS, in line with the appropriate SS seniority list (Dienstaltersliste der Waffen-SS) from July 1, 1944. It contains (incomplete) further SS Honour leaders (SS-Ehrenführer) and SS-Rank leaders for special duty (SS-Rangführer zur besonderen Verwendung), short for SS Honour – and rank leaders (SS-Ehren- und Rangführer).

== List of SS-Oberst-Gruppenführer ==
SS-Oberst-Gruppenführer (literal: SS-Colonel group leader), short SS-Obstgruf, was from 1942 to 1945 the highest commissioned rank in the Schutzstaffel (SS), with the exception of Reichsführer-SS. SS-Obstgruf was comparable to four-star ranks in English speaking armed forces (today equivalent to NATO OF-9).

Rank insignia

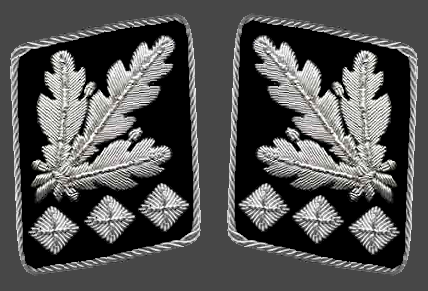
Gorget patches (Allgemeine-SS, Waffen-SS)

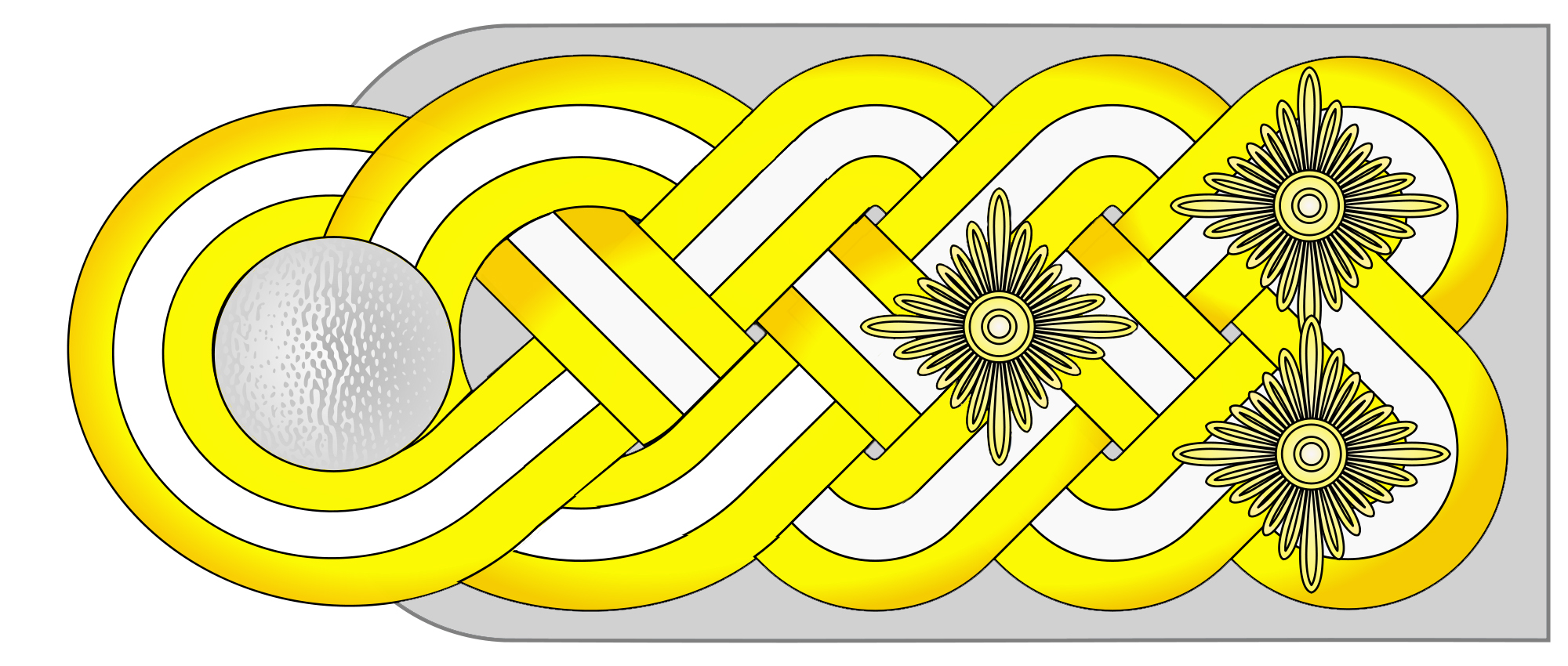
Shoulder strap
(Waffen-SS)

camouflage (Waffen-SS, Wehrmacht)

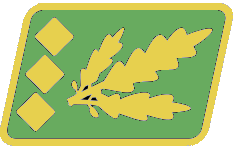
Gorget patch (Ordnungspolizei 1942–1945)

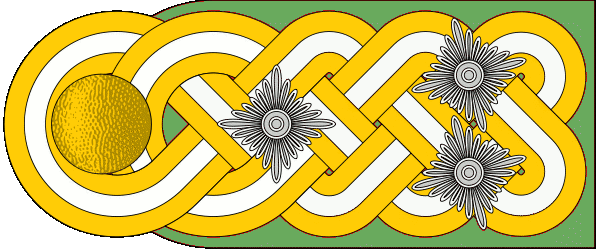
Shoulder strap (Ordnungspolizei, Sicherheitspolizei, Sicherheitsdienst)

Name	Assignment	Birth and death	Comments
Kurt Daluege	Chief of the Ordnungspolizei 1936–1943; Acting Reich Protector of Bohemia and Moravia 1942–1943	1897–1946	also: Generaloberst der Polizei (Colonel general of the police); executed
Josef Dietrich (also: Sepp Dietrich)	Supreme commander 6th Panzer Army	1892–1966	also: Generaloberst der Waffen-SS (Colonel general of the Waffen-SS); briefly imprisoned
Paul Hausser (also: Papa Hausser)	Supreme commander Army Group "Oberrhein" (Heeresgruppe "Oberrhein")	1880–1972	also: Generaloberst der Waffen-SS
Franz Xaver Schwarz	Reichsschatzmeister der NSDAP (Reich Treasurer of the Nazi Party)	1875–1947	Held in an internment camp until his death in 1947

== List of SS-Obergruppenführer ==
SS-Obergruppenführer (literal: SS-Senior group leader), short SS-Ogruf, was the second highest commissioned rank in the SS, comparable to three-star ranks in English speaking armed forces (today equivalent to NATO OF-8).

Rank insignia

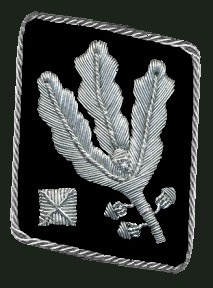
Gorget patch
(until April 1942
Allgemeine SS and Waffen-SS)

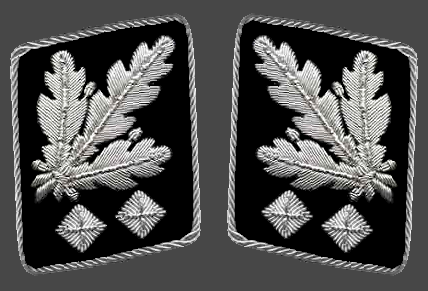
Gorget patches
(1942–1945
Allgemeine SS and Waffen-SS)

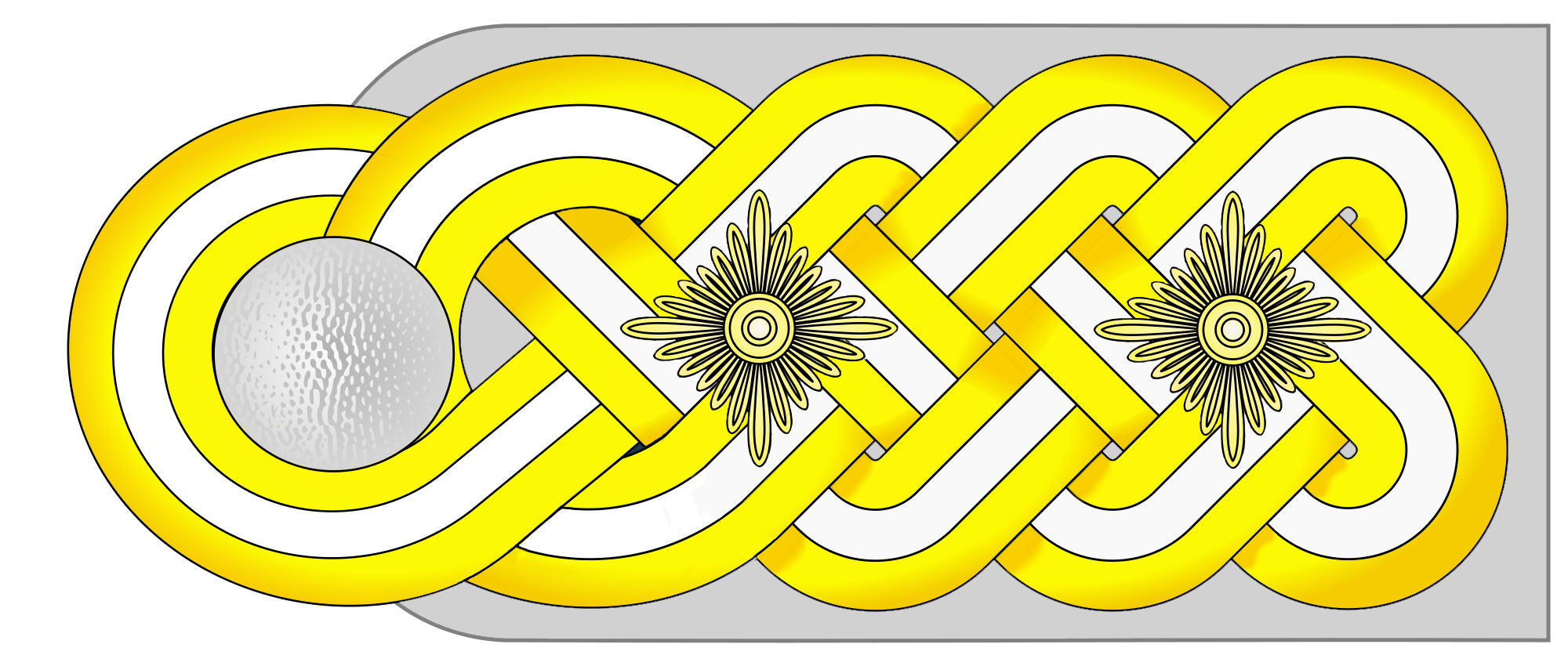
Shoulder board
(Waffen-SS)

camouflage
(Waffen-SS, Wehrmacht)

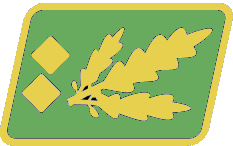
Gorget patch (Ordnungspolizei 1942–1945)

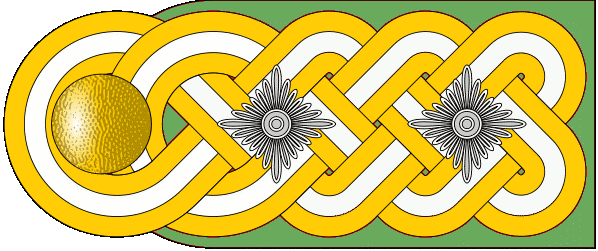
Shoulder strap (Ordnungspolizei, Sicherheitspolizei, Sicherheitsdienst)

Name	Assignment	Birth and death	Comments
Friedrich Alpers (also: Fritz Alpers)	Generalforstmeister (General forest supervisor) and State Secretary in the Reichsforstamt (Reich Forestry Office)	1901–1944	suicide in 1944, while in US custody
Max Amann	SS-Ehren- und Rangführer (SS Honour – and Rank leader); President, Reich Press Chamber; Reichsleiter (Reich Leader) for the Press	1891–1957	labour camp until 1953
Erich von dem Bach-Zelewski (also: Erich von dem Bach)	Chef der Bandenkampfverbände (Chief of the "bandit" fighting formations)	1899–1972	also: General der Waffen-SS und General der Polizei (General of the Waffen-SS and General of the police); 1958–1972 imprisoned
Herbert Backe	SS-Ehrenführer (SS Honour leader); Reichsminister für Ernährung und Landwirtschaft (Reich Minister for Nutrition and Agriculture) 1942–1945;	1896–1947	suicide
Gottlob Berger	Chief of the SS-Hauptamt (SS Main Office) 1939–1945	1896–1975	also: General der Waffen-SS (General of the Waffen-SS); until 1951 imprisoned
Theodor Berkelmann	Höherer SS- und Polizeiführer (Higher SS- and police leader) Elbe (Saxony) 1938–1940; Rhein-Westmark 1940–1943; Wartheland 1943	1894–1943	also: General der Polizei (General of the police)
Werner Best	Deputy of Reinhard Heydrich in the Reichssicherheitshauptamt (Reich Security Main Office); Reichsbevollmächtigter (Reich Plenipotentiary) in Denmark	1903–1989	imprisoned until 1951
Wilhelm Bittrich	Commanding general II SS Panzer Corps	1894–1979	also: General der Waffen-SS; interned in Marseille 1948–1953
Ernst Wilhelm Bohle	SS-Ehrenrang; Gauleiter of the NSDAP Auslandsorganisation (Nazi Party Foreign Organisation)	1903–1960	imprisoned until 1949
Martin Bormann	SS-Ehrenrang; head of the Nazi Party Chancellery from 1941; Adolf Hitler's Personal Secretary from 1943;	1900–1945	Died 1945, likely by suicide; remains of body were discovered in 1972, finally identified formally by means of DNA tests as those of Bormann in 1998.
Philipp Bouhler	SS-Ehrenrang; Chief of Kanzlei des Führers (Hitler's Chancellery); Head of Aktion T4	1899–1945	suicide
Franz Breithaupt	Chief Hauptamt SS-Gericht (SS Court Main Office) 1942–1945	1880–1945	also: General der Waffen-SS; murdered
Walter Buch	SS-Ehrenrang; Chairman of the Supreme Party Court	1883–1949	suicide
Josef Bürckel	Persönlicher Stab Reichsführer SS (Personal Staff Reichsführer SS) ; Gauleiter NSDAP and Reichsstatthalter (Reich Governor) Reichsgau Vienna 1939–1940, Gau Westmark 1941–1944	1895–1944	
Leonardo Conti	Persönlicher Stab Reichsführer SS; German/Swiss physician, Reichsärzteführer (Reich Health Leader); Aktion T4 participant	1900–1945	suicide
Richard Walther Darré	SS-Ehrenrang; Chief SS-Rasse- und Siedlungshauptamt (SS Race and Settlement Main Office) 1931–1938; Reichsminister of Nutrition and Agriculture 1933–1942; Reich Farmers Leader; Head of Reichsnährstand (Reich Nutrition Estate)	1895–1953	imprisoned until 1950
Karl Maria Demelhuber	Commander in Chief Armed forces staff East Coast	1896–1988	also: General der Waffen-SS
Otto Dietrich	SS-Ehrenrang; NSDAP Press Chief; Reich Press Chief; Vice-President, Reich Press Chamber	1897–1952	imprisoned until 1950
Karl von Eberstein (also: Friedrich Karl von Eberstein)	Höherer SS- und Polizeiführer Main (Northern Bavaria) 1938–1942; South (Southern Bavaria) 1938–1945	1894–1979	also: General der Waffen-SS und der Polizei
Joachim Albrecht Eggeling	SS-Ehrenrang; Gauleiter NSDAP Gau Magdeburg-Anhalt 1935–1937, Gau Halle-Merseburg 1937–1945; Oberpräsident of Halle-Merseburg Province	1884–1945	suicide
Theodor Eicke	Commander SS Division Totenkopf 1939–1943	1892–1943	also: General der Waffen-SS; killed in action
August Eigruber	SS-Ehrenrang; Gauleiter NSDAP and Reichsstatthalter Reichsgau Upper Danube	1907–1947	executed in Landsberg
Karl Fiehler	SS-Ehrenrang; Lord Mayor of Munich; Reichsleiter for Municipal Policy	1895–1969	interned until 1949
Albert Forster	SS-Ehrenrang; Gauleiter NSDAP and Reichsstatthalter Reichsgau Danzig	1902–1952	executed in Warsaw
August Frank	Staff Oberkommando des Heeres	1898–1984	also: General der Waffen-SS und der Polizei; imprisoned until 1954
Karl Hermann Frank	Höherer SS- und Polizeiführer Protectorate of Bohemia and Moravia; State Secretary in Bohemia and Moravia; Minister of State for Bohemia and Moravia	1898–1946	also: General der Polizei; executed in Prague
Herbert Gille (also: Herbert Otto Gille)	Commanding general IV SS Panzer Corps	1897–1966	also: General der Waffen-SS
Curt von Gottberg	Commanding general XII SS Army Corps	1896–1945	also: General der Waffen-SS; suicide
Ernst-Robert Grawitz	Reich's physician of the SS- and police	1899–1945	also: General der Waffen-SS; suicide
Ulrich Greifelt	Chief of Staff to the Stabshauptamt des Reichskommissars für die Festigung deutschen Volkstums (Main Staff Office of the Reich's Commissioner for Strengthening of the German Nationality)	1896–1949	also: General der Polizei; imprisoned until 1949
Arthur Greiser	SS-Ehrenrang; Gauleiter NSDAP and Reichsstatthalter Reichsgau Wartheland	1897–1946	executed in Poznań
Karl Gutenberger	Höherer SS- und Polizeiführer West (Westphalia-North Rheinland) 1941–1945	1905–1961	also: General der Waffen; imprisoned until 1953
Karl Hanke	SS-Ehrenrang; Persönlicher Stab Reichsführer SS; Gauleiter NSDAP Gau Lower Silesia; last Reichsführer-SS	1903–1945	killed attempting escape
August Heissmeyer	Höherer SS- und Polizeiführer Spree (Berlin-Brandenburg); Chief SS-Hauptamt 1935–1939; Chief Hauptamt Dienststelle Heissmeyer (Main Office Division Heißmeyer)	1897–1979	also: General der Waffen-SS
Wolf-Heinrich Graf von Helldorff	SS-Ehrenrang: General der Polizei; SA-Obergruppenführer; Police President of Potsdam (1933–1935) and Berlin (1935–1944)	1896–1944	involved in the 20 July Plot; executed in Plötzensee prison
Konrad Henlein	SS-Ehrenrang; Gauleiter NSDAP and Reichsstatthalter Reichsgau Sudetenland	1898–1945	suicide
Maximilian von Herff	Chief SS-Personalhauptamt (SS Personnel Main Office) 1942–1945	1893–1945	also: General der Waffen-SS; died in British captivity
Rudolf Hess	SS-Ehrenrang; Deputy Führer to Adolf Hitler; Reichsminister without Portfolio	1894–1987	imprisoned after Nuremberg trials until 1987; suicide
Reinhard Heydrich	Chief Reichssicherheitshauptamt (RSHA) 1939–1942; Oberster Befehlshaber der Sicherheitsdienst (SD); Deputy Reich Protector of Bohemia and Moravia 1941–1942	1904–1942	also: General der Polizei; assassinated in Prague
Friedrich Hildebrandt	SS-Ehrenrang; Persönlicher Stab Reichsführer SS; Gauleiter NSDAP Gau Mecklenburg and Reichsstatthalter Mecklenburg	1898–1948	executed in Landsberg
Richard Hildebrandt	Chief SS-Rasse- und Siedlungshauptamt 1943–1945; Höherer SS- und Polizeiführer Rhein 1939; Weichsel (Danzig-West Prussia) 1939–1943; Black Sea 1943–1944; Southeast (Silesia) 1944–1945; Bohemia-Moravia (1945)	1897–1951	also: General der Waffen-SS und der Polizei; executed in Poland
Hermann Höfle	Höherer SS- und Polizeiführer Center (Hanover-Brunswick) 1943–1944; Slovakia 1944–1945	1898–1947	also: General der Waffen-SS und der Polizei; executed in Bratislava
Otto Hofmann	Höherer SS- und Polizeiführer Southwest (Baden-Württemberg) 1943–1945; Chief SS-Rasse- und Siedlungshauptamt 1940–1943	1896–1982	also: General der Waffen-SS und der Polizei; imprisoned 1945–1954
Friedrich Jeckeln	Höherer SS- und Polizeiführer Center (Hanover-Brunswick) 1938–1940; West (Westphalia-North Rheinland) 1940–1941; Russia-South 1941; Russia-North 1941–1945	1889–1946	also: General der Polizei; executed in Riga
Hugo Jury	Persönlicher Stab Reichsführer SS; Gauleiter NSDAP and Reichsstatthalter Reichsgau Lower Danube	1887–1945	suicide
Hans Jüttner	Chief SS-Führungshauptamt (SS Main Office)	1894–1965	also: General der Waffen-SS; imprisoned until 1950
Ernst Kaltenbrunner	Chief Reichssicherheitshauptamt 1943–1945; Höherer SS- und Polizeiführer Danube 1938–1943	1903–1946	also: General der Waffen-SS; executed after Nuremberg trials
Hans Kammler	SS-Wirtschafts- und Verwaltungshauptamt, Chef Amt C (Bauwesen) SS Main Management – and Administration Office, Chief Office division C (Construction)	1901–1945	also: General der Waffen-SS; disappeared
Jürgen von Kamptz	Commander in Chief of the Ordnungspolizei in Italy	1891–1954	also: General der Polizei
Karl Kaufmann	SS-Ehrenrang; Persönlicher Stab Reichsführer SS; Gauleiter NSDAP and Reichsstatthalter Gau Hamburg	1900–1966	imprisoned for short periods between 1948 and 1953
Georg Keppler	Commanding general I SS Panzer Corps; III SS Panzer Corps; XVIII SS Army Corps	1894–1966	also: General der Waffen-SS; interned until 1948
Wilhelm Keppler	SS-Ehrenrang; industrialist	1882–1960	also: General der Waffen-SS; imprisoned until 1951
Dietrich Klagges	SS-Ehrenrang; Persönlicher Stab Reichsführer SS; Ministerpräsident Free State Brunswick	1891–1971	imprisoned until 1957
Matthias Kleinheisterkamp	Commanding general XI SS Army Corps	1893–1945	also: General der Waffen-SS; suicide
Kurt Knoblauch	SS-Führungshauptamt, Chief Office division B	1885–1952	also: General der Waffen-SS; imprisoned1949–1951
Wilhelm Koppe	Höherer SS- und Polizeiführer Warthegau 1939–1943; East (General Government) 1943–1945; State Secretary for Security in the General Government	1896–1975	also: General der Waffen-SS; imprisoned 1960–1962
Paul Körner	SS-Ehrenrang; Persönlicher Stab Reichsführer SS; State Secretary of Prussia and the Four Year Plan	1893–1957	imprisoned until 1951
Friedrich-Wilhelm Krüger	Commanding general V SS Mountain Corps 1944–1945; Höherer SS- und Polizeiführer East (General Government) 1939–1943	1894–1945	also: General der Waffen-SS; suicide
Walter Krüger	Commanding general VI SS Army Corps	1890–1945	also: General der Waffen-SS; suicide
Hans Heinrich Lammers	SS-Ehrenrang; Chief of the German Reich Chancellery (Reichskanzlei); Reichsminister without Portfolio	1879–1962	imprisoned until 1951
Hartmann Lauterbacher	SS-Ehrenrang; Persönlicher Stab Reichsführer SS; HJ-Stabsführer & Deputy Reichsjugendführer; Gauleiter NSDAP Gau Southern Hanover-Brunswick; Oberpräsident Province of Hanover	1909–1988	interned until 1948; escaped
Werner Lorenz	SS-Ehrenrang; Chief SS-Hauptamt (SS Main Office)	1891–1974	also: General der Waffen-SS; imprisoned until 1955
Benno Martin	Höherer SS- und Polizeiführer Main (Northern Bavaria) 1942–1945	1893–1975	also: General der Waffen-SS und der Polizei; interned until 1948; imprisonment 1953, absolved
Heinrich von Maur	SS-Ehrenrang; Stab Upper Sector South West	1863–1947	also: General of the Artillery
Emil Mazuw	Höherer SS- und Polizeiführer Baltic Sea (Pomerania-Mecklenburg)	1900–1987	also: General der Waffen-SS; imprisoned until 1951
Wilhelm Murr	SS-Ehrenrang; Persönlicher Stab Reichsführer SS; Gauleiter NSDAP Gau Württemberg-Hohenzollern and Reichsstatthalter Württemberg	1888–1945	suicide
Konstantin von Neurath	SS-Ehrenrang; Reichsminister for Foreign Affairs 1933–1938; President, Secret Cabinet Council; Reich Protector of Bohemia and Moravia 1939–1943	1873–1956	imprisoned after Nuremberg trials until 1954
Carl Oberg	Höherer SS- und Polizeiführer France	1897–1965	also: General der Waffen-SS und der Polizei; imprisoned until 1962
Günther Pancke	Chief SS-Rasse- und Siedlungshauptamt 1938–1940; Höherer SS- und Polizeiführer Center (Hanover-Brunswick) 1940–1943; Denmark 1943-1945	1899–1973	also: General der Polizei; imprisoned until 1953
Karl Pfeffer-Wildenbruch	SS-Führungshauptamt; Commanding general in Hungary	1888–1971	also: General der Waffen-SS und der Polizei
Artur Phleps	Commanding general V SS Mountain Corps 1943–1944	1881–1944	also: General der Waffen-SS; killed in action
Oswald Pohl	Chief SS-Wirtschafts- und Verwaltungshauptamt (SS Main Economic and Administrative Office) 1942–1945	1892–1951	also: General der Waffen-SS; executed in Landsberg
Hans-Adolf Prützmann	Höherer SS- und Polizeiführer North Sea (Schleswig-Holstein; Weser-Ems) 1938–1941; Northeast (East Prussia) 1941; Russia-North 1941; Russia-South 1941–1943; Höchster SS- und Polizeiführer (Supreme SS and Police Leader) Ukraine 1943–1944; Inspector General Werwolf units 1944–1945	1901–1945	also: General der Waffen-SS und der Polizei; suicide
Rudolf Querner	Höherer SS- und Polizeiführer North Sea (Schleswig-Holstein; Weser-Ems) 1941–1943; Danube 1943–1944; Center (Hanover-Brunswick) 1944–1945	1893–1945	also: General der Waffen-SS und der Polizei; suicide
Friedrich Rainer	Persönlicher Stab Reichsführer SS; Gauleiter NSDAP and Reichsstatthalter Reichsgau Salzburg 1938–1941, Reichsgau Carinthia 1941–1945	1903–1947	executed in Ljubljana
Hanns Albin Rauter	Höherer SS- und Polizeiführer Northwest (Netherlands)	1895–1949	also: General der Waffen-SS und der Polizei; executed
Wilhelm Rediess	Höherer SS- und Polizeiführer Northeast (East Prussia) 1938–1940; North (Norway) 1940–1945	1900–1945	also: General der Waffen-SS und der Polizei; suicide
Wilhelm Reinhard	Persönlicher Stab Reichsführer SS	1869–1955	also: General der Waffen-SS
Joachim von Ribbentrop	SS-Ehrenrang; Reichsminister for Foreign Affairs 1933–1938	1893–1946	executed after Nuremberg trials
Erwin Rösener	Höherer SS- und Polizeiführer Rhein (Southern Rheinland-Saar)1940-1941; Alpenland 1941-1945	1902–1946	also: General der Waffen-SS und der Polizei; executed
Ernst Sachs	Head of Telecommunications in Persönlicher Stab Reichsführer SS	1880–1956	also: General der Waffen-SS
Fritz Sauckel	SS-Ehrenrang; General Plenipotentiary for Deployment of Labour; Gauleiter NSDAP Gau Thuringia and Reichsstatthalter Thuringia	1894–1946	executed after Nuremberg trials
Paul Scharfe	Chief SS Court Main Office 1933–1942;	1876–1942	
Julius Schaub	SS-Ehrenrang; Chief Personal Adjutant of Adolf Hitler	1898–1967	interned until 1949
Gustav Adolf Scheel	Persönlicher Stab Reichsführer SS; Gauleiter NSDAP and Reichsstatthalter Reichsgau Salzburg	1907–1979	interned until 1948
Fritz Schlessmann	Persönlicher Stab Reichsführer SS; Deputy Gauleiter NSDAP Gau Essen	1899–1964	imprisoned until 1950
Ernst-Heinrich Schmauser	Höherer SS- und Polizeiführer Southeast (Silesia)	1890–1945	also: General der Waffen-SS und der Polizei; missing in action
Walter Schmitt	Chief SS-Personalhauptamt (SS Personnel Main Office) 1939–1942; Persönlicher Stab Reichsführer SS	1879–1945	also: General der Waffen-SS; executed in Dablice (Czchoslovakia)
Friedrich Graf von der Schulenburg	Persönlicher Stab Reichsführer SS	1865–1939	
Oskar Schwerk	Persönlicher Stab Reichsführer SS; Country leader Reich's war veteran organisation (Reichs Kriegerbund)	1869–1950	
Arthur Seyss-Inquart	SS-Ehrenrang; Reichsstatthalter Austria; Reichskommissar Netherlands; Reichsminister without Portfolio	1892–1946	executed after Nuremberg trials
Felix Steiner	Commanding general III SS Panzer Corps; Commanding general 11th SS Panzer Army	1896–1966	also: General der Waffen-SS
Wilhelm Stuckart	SS-Ehrenrang; State Secretary in the Reich Ministry of Interior	1902–1953	
Siegfried Taubert	Persönlicher Stab Reichsführer SS	1880–1946	also: General der Waffen-SS und der Polizei
Fritz Wächtler	SS-Ehrenrang; Gauleiter NSDAP Gau Bavarian Eastern March	1891–1945	shot to death by SS for desertion
Karl Wahl	SS-Ehrenrang; Gauleiter NSDAP Gau Swabia and Regierungspräsident Swabia	1892–1981	imprisoned until 1949
Josias, Hereditary Prince of Waldeck and Pyrmont	Höherer SS- und Polizeiführer Fulda-Werra (Hesse-Thuringia)	1896–1967	also: General der Waffen-SS und der Polizei; imprisoned until 1950
Paul Wegener	SS-Ehrenrang; Gauleiter NSDAP Gau Weser-Ems; Reichsstatthalter Oldenburg and Bremen	1904–1993	imprisoned until 1951
Fritz Weitzel	Höherer SS- und Polizeiführer West (Westphalia-North Rheinland) 1938–1940	1904–1940	
Otto Winkelmann	Höherer SS- und Polizeiführer Hungary	1894–1977	also: General der Waffen-SS und der Polizei; interned until 1948
Karl Wolff	Chief Persönlicher Stabe Reichsführer SS; SS liaison officer to Führer HQ 1939–1943; Höchster SS- und Polizeiführer (Supreme SS and Police Leader) Italy 1943-1945	1900–1984	also: General der Waffen-SS; imprisoned 1945–1949 and 1964–1969
Udo von Woyrsch	Höherer SS- und Polizeiführer Elbe (Saxony)	1895–1983	imprisoned 1945–1952 and 1957–1960
Alfred Wünnenberg	Commander of 4th SS Polizei Panzergrenadier Division 1941–1943; Chief Ordnungspolizei 1943–1945	1891–1963	also: General der Waffen-SS und der Polizei; interned until 1947
Ferenc Feketehalmy-Czeydner	Served the II SS Panzer Corps	1890–1946	also: Colonel General at the Royal Hungarian Army; executed at 1946 in Žabalj

== List of SS-Gruppenführer ==
SS-Gruppenführer (literal: SS-Group leader), short SS-Gruf, was the third highest commissioned rank in the SS, comparable to two-star ranks in English speaking armed forces (today equivalent to NATO OF-7).

Rank insignia

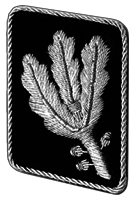
Gorget patch
until April 1942
(Allgemeine SS and Waffen-SS)

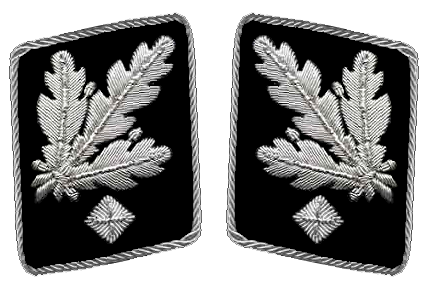
Gorget patches
1942–1945
(Allgemeine SS, Waffen-SS)

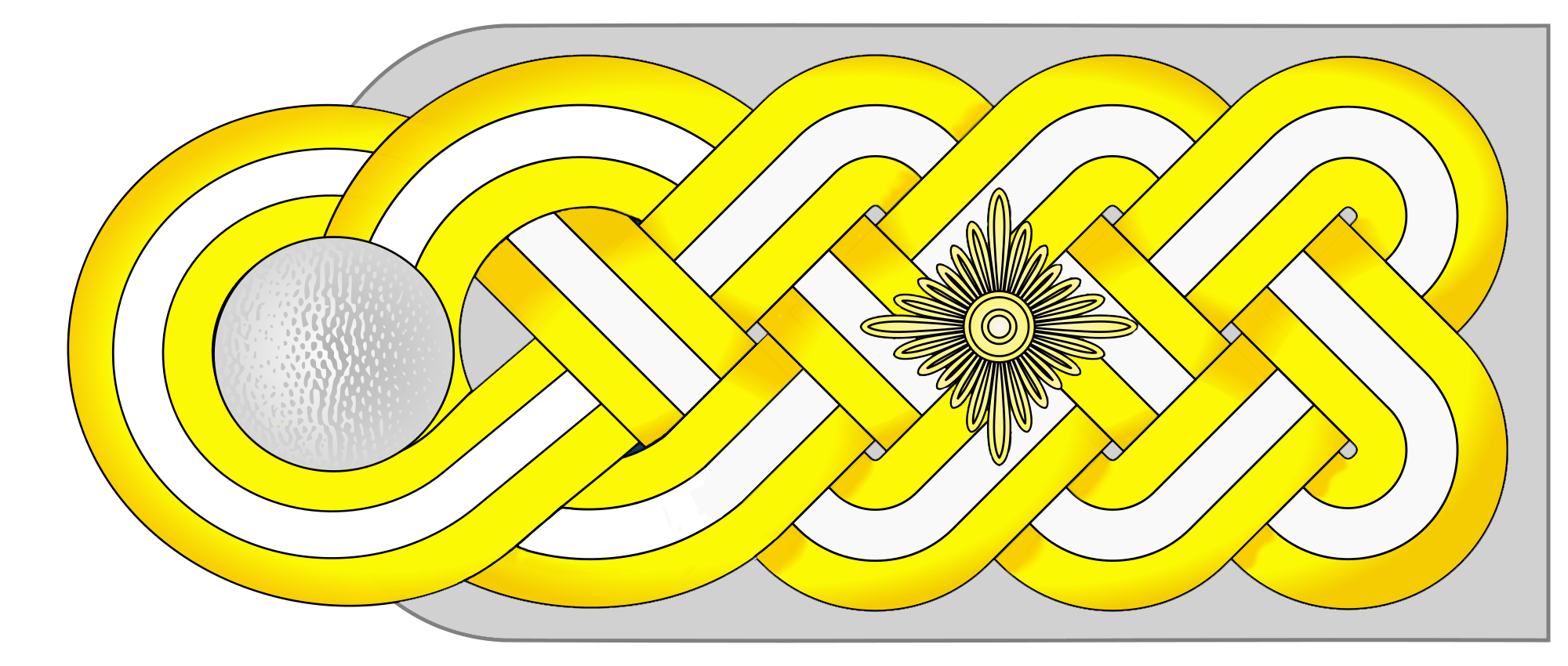
Shoulder board
(Waffen-SS)

camouflage
(Waffen-SS, Wehrmacht)

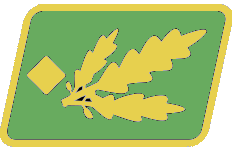
Gorget patch (Ordnungspolizei 1942–1945)

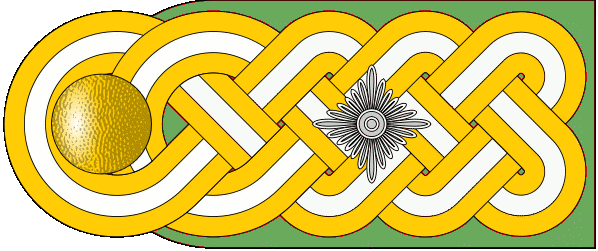
Shoulder board (Ordnungspolizei, Sicherheitspolizei, Sicherheitsdienst)

Name	Assignment	Birth and death	Comments
Ludolf-Hermann von Alvensleben (also: Bubi von Alvensleben)	Höherer SS- und Polizeiführer (Higher SS- and police leader) Elbe (Saxony)	1901–1970	also: Generalleutnant der Waffen-SS und der Polizei (Lieutenant general of the Waffen-SS and of the Police)
Rūdolfs Bangerskis	Latvian general and War ministry; Inspector general of the Latvian SS-Formations	1878–1958	also: Generalleutnant der Waffen-SS (Lieutenant general of the Waffen-SS)
Georg-Henning Graf von Bassewitz-Behr	Höherer SS- und Polizeiführer North Sea (North Hanover and Schleswig-Holstein)	1900–1949	also: Generalleutnant der Waffen-SS und der Polizei
Hans Baur	Commander flying squadron of the Führer	1897–1993	also: Generalleutnant der Polizei
Herbert Becker	Head of Ordnungspolizei, General Government; Inspector General Ordnungspolizei Main Office	1887–1974	also: Generalleutnant der Polizei
Max von Behr	SS-Commanding officer of Berlin	1879–1951	also: Generalleutnant der Waffen-SS
Carl Blumenreuter	Office Reich's physician of the SS and police, Master medical ordnance (Sanitäts-Feldzeugmeister)	1881–1969	also: Generalleutnant der Waffen-SS
Adolf von Bomhard	Head of the police in Reichskommissariat Ukraine	1891–1976	also: Generalleutnant der Polizei
Walter Braemer	Nazi criminal responsible for mass murders of the civilian population	1883–1955	also: General of the Cavalry
Karl Brandt	SS-Führungshauptamt (SS-Command and control main office) , Personal physician of Adolf Hitler and Reich Commissioner for Health and Emergency Services	1904–1948	also: Generalleutnant der Waffen-SS; executed
Karl Jakob Heinrich Brenner	Commander police battle group Brenner (Polizei-Kampfgruppe Brenner); Commander 6th SS Mountain Division Nord	1895–1954	also: Generalleutnant der Polizei
Lothar Debes	Commander in chief of the Waffen-SS Italy	1895–1960	also: Generalleutnant der Waffen-SS
Hermann Fegelein	SS-Führungshauptamt, Chief Office Division VI; Himmler's liaison officer in Führerbunker; Eva Braun brother-in-law	1906–1945	also: Generalleutnant der Waffen-SS; shot on Hitler's orders for attempted desertion
Josef Fitzthum	Höherer SS- und Polizeiführer Albania	1896–1945	also: Generalleutnant der Waffen-SS und der Polizei
Alfred Freyberg	Minister-President of Anhalt; Oberbürgermeister of Leipzig	1892–1945	suicide
Karl Gebhardt	Office Reich's physician of the SS and Police, Head clinician	1897–1948	also: Generalleutnant der Waffen-SS; executed
Karl Genzken	SS-Führungshauptamt, Chief Office Division D; physician	1895–1957	also: Generalleutnant der Waffen-SS; imprisoned 1945–1954
Karl Gerland	Gauleiter NSDAP Kurhessen	1905–1945	
Odilo Globočnik	Gauleiter NSDAP Vienna; SS- und Polizeiführer Lublin; Höherer SS- und Polizeiführer Adriatic Coast	1904–1945	also: Generalleutnant der Polizei; suicide
Richard Glücks	SS-Wirtschafts- und Verwaltungshauptamt (SS-Management and administration main office), Chief office division D	1898–1945	also: Generalleutnant der Waffen-SS; suicide
József Grassy	Commander 25th Waffen Grenadier Division of the SS Hunyadi (1st Hungarian); 26th Waffen Grenadier Division of the SS (2nd Hungarian)	1894–1946	also: Generalleutnant der Waffen-SS; executed in Yugoslavia
Wilhelm Grimm	Reichsleiter; Chairman of the Second Chamber of the Supreme Party Court	1889–1944	died in a car accident
Hans Haltermann	SS- und Polizeiführer Kiev; Charkow; Mogilew	1898–1981	also: Generalleutnant der Polizei
Wilhelm Harster	Commander of SiPo and SD in the Netherlands and in Italy	1904–1991	also: Generalleutnant der Polizei; imprisoned 1945–1953, 1966–1968
Paul Hennicke	Police President of Weimar; SS- und Polizeiführer Rostow-Awdejewka; Kiev	1883–1967	also: Generalleutnant der Polizei
Albert Hoffmann	Gauleiter NSDAP Westphalia South	1907–1972	
Leo von Jena	Persönlicher Stab Reichsführer SS (Personal staff Reichsführer SS)	1876–1957	also: Generalleutnant der Waffen-SS
Rudolf Jung	Honorary Gauleiter	1882–1945	committed suicide in Czech captivity
Richard Jungclaus	Höherer SS- und Polizeiführer Belgium and Northern France	1905–1945	also: Generalleutnant der Polizei; killed in action
Konstantin Kammerhofer	Höherer SS- und Polizeiführer Croatia	1899–1958	also: Generalleutnant der Polizei
Fritz Katzmann	SS- und Polizeiführer Radom; Lemberg; Höherer SS- und Polizeiführer Vistula, 1943–1945	1906–1957	also: Generalleutnant der Waffen-SS und der Polizei
Kurt Kaul	Höherer SS- und Polizeiführer Southwest (Württemberg and Baden)	1890–1944	also: Generalleutnant der Polizei; killed in action
Gerhard Klopfer	State Secretary of the Party Chancellery; Wannsee Conference participant	1905–1987	
Gerret Korsemann	SS- und Polizeiführer Rowno; Rostov-Awdejewka	1895–1958	also: Generalleutnant der Polizei; imprisoned 1947–1949
Wilhelm Kube	SS-Ehrenführer; Gauleiter NSDAP Kurmark; Generalkommissar Belarus	1887–1943	discharged from the SS 11 March 1936; assassinated by a Soviet partisan in Minsk
Heinz Lammerding	Chief of staff Supreme command Army Group Vistula (Heeresgruppe Weichsel)	1905–1971	also: Generalleutnant der Waffen-SS
Wilhelm Friedrich Loeper	SS-Ehrenführer; Gauleiter NSDAP Magdeburg-Anhalt; Reichsstatthalter Anhalt and Brunswick	1883–1935	
Georg Lörner	SS-Wirtschafts- und Verwaltungshauptamt, Chief Office division B	1899–1959	also: Generalleutnant der Waffen-SS; imprisoned 1945–1954
Wilhelm Meinberg	Reich Chairman of the Reichsnährstand; Executive in the Reichswerke Hermann Göring	1898–1973	
Heinrich Müller	Head of Amt-IV: Gestapo	1900–1945(?)	missing, May 1945
Arthur Nebe	Head of Amt-V: Kriminalpolizei; Commander in Chief Task Group B (Task groups Sicherheitspolizei and SD);	1894–1945	involved in the 20 July Plot; executed at Plötzensee Prison
Otto Ohlendorf	Head of Amt-III: SD-Inland (Internal Intelligence); Commander in Chief Task Group D (Task groups Sicherheitspolizei and SD);	1907–1951	also: Generalleutnant der Polizei; executed
Werner Ostendorff	Chief of staff Supreme Command Army Group Upper Rhine	1903–1945	also: Generalleutnant der Waffen-SS
Leo Petri	SS-Führungshauptamt, Chief Office division III	1876–1961	also: Generalleutnant der Waffen-SS
Hermann Priess	Commanding general I SS Panzer Corps	1901–1985	also: Generalleutnant der Waffen-SS
Carl Friedrich von Pückler-Burghauss	Commander in Chief of the Waffen-SS Bohemia and Moravia	1886–1945	also: Generalleutnant der Waffen-SS
Heinz Reinefarth	Höherer SS- und Polizeiführer Warthe, 1944	1903–1979	also: Generalleutnant der Waffen-SS und der Polizei
Hans-Joachim Riecke	SS-Ehrenführer; Reichskommissar of Schaumburg-Lippe; Staatsminister of Lippe	1899–1986	
Alfred Rodenbücher	Höherer SS- und Polizeiführer Alpenland	1900–1980	
Karl-Gustav Sauberzweig	SS-Führungshauptamt	1899–1944	also: Generalleutnant der Waffen-SS; suicide
Walter Schimana	Höherer SS- und Polizeiführer Greece; Danube	1898–1946	also: Generalleutnant der Waffen-SS und der Polizei; suicide
Willy Schmelcher	Höherer SS- und Polizeiführer Warthe, 1945	1894–1974	also: Generalleutnant der Polizei
Fritz von Scholz	Commander 11th SS Volunteer Panzergrenadier Division "Nordland"	1896–1944	also: Generalleutnant der Waffen-SS; killed in action
Ludwig von Schröder	Commander of military forces in Serbia	1884–1941	also: a Luftwaffe General der Flakartillerie; died of injuries sustained in a plane crash
Otto Schumann	Commander of Ordnungspolizei (BdO), Reichskommissariat Niederlande; Inspector of Ordnungspolizei (IdO), Wehrkreise II, VI & XVII	1886–1952	also: Generalleutnant der Polizei
Otto Schwab	Commander Artillery School	1889–1959	also: Generalleutnant der Waffen-SS
Siegfried Seidel-Dittmarsch	Chief of SS-Amt and Fuhrungstabs	1887–1934	
Max Simon	Commanding general XIII SS Army Corps	1899–1961	also: Generalleutnant der Waffen-SS
Jakob Sporrenberg	Höherer SS- und Polizeiführer Northeast (East Prussia); SS- und Polizeiführer Minsk; Lublin	1902–1952	also: Generalleutnant der Polizei; sentenced to death
Walter Staudinger	Higher artillery commander 6th Panzer Army	1898–1964	also: Generalleutnant der Waffen-SS
Bruno Streckenbach	Commander 19th Waffen Grenadier Division of the SS	1902–1977	also: Generalleutnant der Waffen-SS
Jürgen Stroop	Höherer SS- und Polizeiführer Rhine-Westmark	1895–1952	also: Generalleutnant der Waffen-SS und der Polizei; executed
Max Thomas	Behfelshaber der Sicherheitspolizei und der SD (BdS) Belgium & northern France; BdS Ukraine; Commander of Einsatzgruppe C	1891–1945	also: Generalleutnant der Polizei; suicide
Karl Fischer von Treuenfeld	Behfelshaber Waffen SS, Protectorate of Bohemia-Moravia; Commander 10th SS Panzer Division "Frundsberg"; SS-Führungshauptamt, Inspector, Panzer troops	1885–1946	also: Generalleutnant der Waffen-SS
Harald Turner	Deputy chief SS Race and Settlement Main Office	1891–1947	also: Generalleutnant der Waffen-SS; executed in Belgrade
Otto Wächter (also: Baron Otto Gustav von Wächter)	Governor of the Kraków District and, later, the District of Galicia in the General Government	1901–1949	also: Generalleutnant der Waffen-SS
Waldemar Wappenhans	SS- und Polizeiführer Wolhynien-Brest-Litovsk; Nicolajew; Dnjepropetrowsk-Krivoi Rog	1893–1967	also: Generalleutnant der Polizei
Friedrich Weber	Instructor in veterinary medicine at the Ludwig-Maximilians-Universität München (LMU)	1892–1955	
Richard Wendler	Governor of Lublin District in the General Government	1898–1972	also: Generalleutnant der Polizei
Curt Wittje (also: Kurt Wittje)	Member of the German Reichstag; Chief SS-Hauptamt (SS Main office) 1934–1935	1894–1947	discharged from the SS, November 12, 1938
Karl Zech	Police President of Essen; SS- und Polizeiführer Kraków District	1892–1944	Expelled from the SS and committed suicide.

== List of SS-Brigadeführer ==
SS-Brigadeführer (literal: SS-Brigade leader), short SS-Brif, was the lowest general rank in the SS, comparable to one-star ranks in English speaking armed forces (today equivalent to NATO OF-6).

Rank insignia

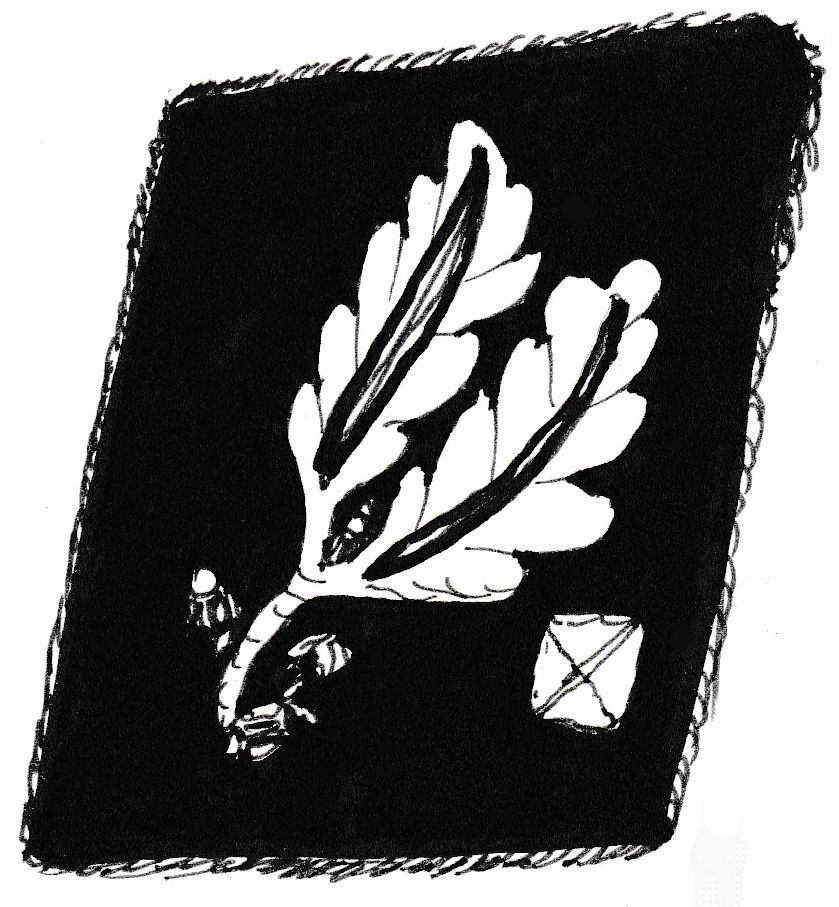
Gorget patch
until April 1942
(Allgemeine SS and Waffen-SS)

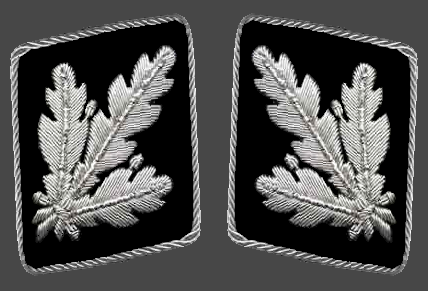
Gorget patches
1942–1945
(Allgemeine SS, Waffen-SS)

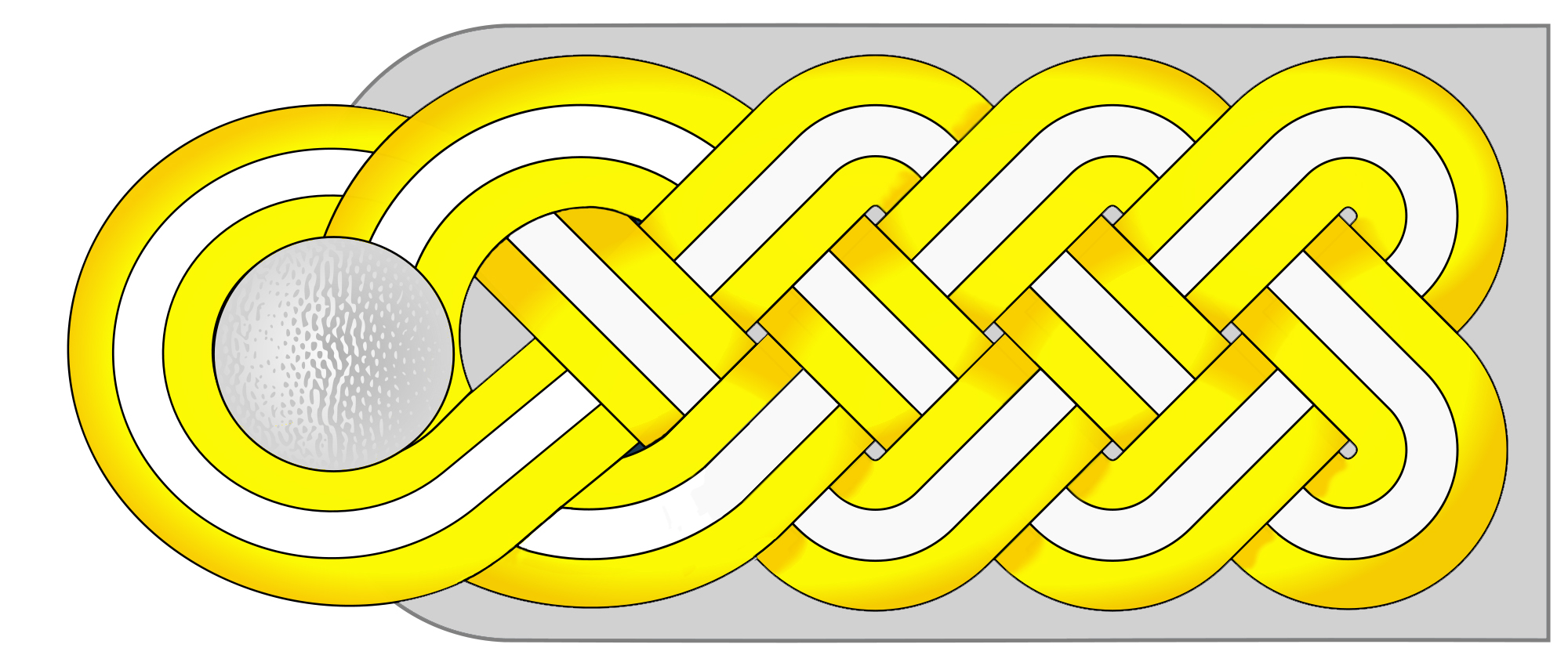
Shoulder board
(Waffen-SS)

camouflage
(Waffen-SS, Wehrmacht)

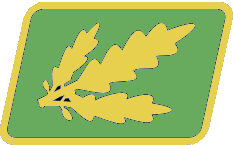
Gorget patch (Ordnungspolizei 1942–1945)

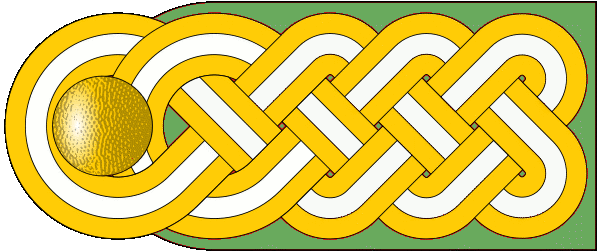
Shoulder board (Ordnungspolizei, Sicherheitspolizei, Sicherheitsdienst)

Name	Assignment	Birth and death	Remark
Heinrich Otto Abetz	German ambassador to Vichy France during World War II	1903–1958	also: convicted war criminal, imprisoned until 1954
Georg Altner	Police President in Plauen and in Dortmund	1901–1945	also: Generalmajor der polizei; suicide
Franz Augsberger	20th Waffen-SS Grenadier Division	1905–1945	also: Generalmajor der Waffen-SS (Major general of the Waffen-SS); killed in action
Werner Ballauff	Commander SS-Waffen-Junker-School Braunschweig	1890–1973	also: Generalmajor der Waffen-SS
Hellmuth Becker	Commander 3rd SS-Panzer Division Totenkopf	1902–1953	also: Generalmajor der Waffen-SS; executed in the Soviet Union for war crimes
Walther Bierkamp	Commander of SiPo and SD: Düsseldorf, Belgium & northern France, General Government, Südwest; Commander of Einsatzgruppe D; Acting Higher SS and Police Leader, "Südost"	1901–1945	also: Generalmajor der Polizei; suicide
Wilhelm Börger	Ministerial Director in the Reich Ministry of Labor; Trustee of Labor in Rhine Province	1896–1962	
Herbert Böttcher	SS- und Polizeiführer "Radom;" Police Director, Memel; Police President, Kassel	1907–1950	also: Generalmajor der Polizei; hanged in Radom for war crimes
Andreas Bolek	Honorary Gauleiter; SD Main Office; Police President, Magdeburg	1894–1945	also: Generalmajor der Polizei; suicide
Curt Brasack	IV SS Panzer Corps, artillery-commander		also: Generalmajor der Waffen-SS
Karl Burk	Commander 15th Waffen Grenadier Division of the SS	1898–1963	also: Generalmajor der Waffen-SS
Friedrich Karl Dermietzel	Army physician 6th Panzer Army	1899–1981	also: Generalmajor der Waffen-SS
Christoph Diehm	SS- und Polizeiführer "Shitomir;" "Lemberg;" "Kattowitz"	1892–1960	also: Generalmajor der Waffen-SS und der Polizei
Gustav Diesterweg	Commander SS-Waffen-Technische Lehranstalt (SS Weapon technical training centre)	1875–19??	also: Generalmajor der Waffen-SS
Werner Dörffler-Schuband	SS-Führungshauptamt (SS Main Command and Control Office), Chef Amt XI (Chief Office division XI)		
Hans Döring	SS- und Polizeiführer "Stalino-Donezgebeit"	1901–1970	also: Generalmajor der Polizei; Hauptsturmführer der Waffen-SS
Wilhelm von Dufais	Chief communications		
Ernst Otto Fick	SS-Hauptamt (SS Main Office), Inspector W.E.	1898–1945	also: Generalmajor der Waffen-SS; killed in action
Richard Fiedler	SS- und Polizeiführer "Montenegro"	1908–1974	also: Generalmajor der Polizei; Hauptsturmführer der Waffen-SS
Fritz Freitag	Commander 14th Waffen Grenadier Division of the SS	1894–1945	also: Generalmajor der Waffen-SS und der Polizei (Major general of the Waffen-SS and of the police); suicide
Heinrich Gärtner	SS-Führungshauptamt, Chief Office division VIII	1889–1963	also: Generalmajor der Waffen-SS
Paul Otto Geibel	SS- und Polizeiführer "Warsaw"	1898–1966	also: Generalmajor der Polizei; convicted of war crimes and committed suicide in a Polish prison.
Werner Gerlach	SS-Ehrenrang (SS Honour Rank); Persönlicher Stab Reichsführer SS (Personal Staff Reichsführer-SS)	1891–1963	
Bruno Goedicke	SS-Commanding officer of Vienna		
Walter Granzow	Minister-president of Mecklenburg-Schwerin; president of the Deutsche Rentenbank	1887–1952	
Ludwig Grauert	State Secretary in the Prussian and Reich Ministry of the Interior	1891–1964	
Wilhelm Günther	SS- und Polizeiführer "Bergvolker-Ordshonikidse," "Ronow;" Commander of SiPo and SD in Trieste	1899–1945	also: Generalmajor der Polizei; declared dead at the end of the war
Leopold Gutterer	State Secretary, Propaganda Ministry; Vice-President, Reich Chamber of Culture	1902–1996	
Hermann Haertel	Rasse- und Siedlungshauptamt (Race- and Settlement Main Office)		
Desiderius Hampel	Commander 13th Waffen Mountain Division of the SS "Handschar"	1895–1981	Generalmajor der Waffen-SS
Peter Hansen	Artillery commander	1896–1967	
Hermann Harm	SS- und Polizeiführer "Dnjepropetrovsk-Kriwoi Rog;" "Litauen"	1894–1985	also: Generalmajor der Polizei
Heinz Harmel	Commander 10th SS Panzer Division "Frundsberg"	1906–2000	also: Generalmajor der Waffen-SS
Ernst Hartmann	SS- und Polizeiführer "Tschernigow;" "Shitomir;" "Pripet;" "Wolhynien-Luzk"	1897–1945	also: Generalmajor der Polizei; died of cancer May 1945
Max Henze	Police President in Kassel, Bromberg, Danzig and Essen	1899–1951	also: Generalmajor der Polizei; hanged in Bydgoszcz for war crimes
Karl Herrmann	collocated to Höherer SS- und Polizeiführer (Higher SS- and police leader) Adriatic Coast		
Kurt Hintze	SS- und Polizeiführer "Litauen"	1901–1944	also: Generalmajor der Polizei
Franz Josef Huber	Inspector of SiPo and SD, Wehrkreis XVII	1902–1975	also: Generalmajor der Polizei
Alfred Karrasch	Commander SS Training Area Bohemia		also: Generalmajor der Waffen-SS
Adolf Katz	Politician (NSDAP); Chief Constable	1899–1980	also: Generalmajor der Waffen-SS
Wilhelm Keilhaus	SS-Führungshauptamt, Inspector Intelligence and Chief Communications	1898–1977	also: Generalmajor der Waffen-SS
Hubert Klausner	Gauleiter NSDAP and Landeshauptmann Carinthia	1892–1939	died of a stroke
Gottfried Klingemann	Reichssicherheitshauptamt	1884–1953	discharged from the Waffen-SS May 31, 1944
Fritz Kraemer	Commander 12th SS Panzer Division "Hitlerjugend"	1900–1959	also: Generalmajor der Waffen-SS und der Polizei
Hans Krebs	Honorary Gauleiter and a Regierungspräsident in Reichsgau Sudetenland	1888–1947	Executed for treason in Czechoslovakia
Gustav Krukenberg	Inspector of the French Waffen-SS Voluntary formations	1888–1980	also: Generalmajor der Waffen-SS
Christian Peter Kryssing	III (Germanic) SS Panzer Corps	1891–1976	also: Generalmajor der Waffen-SS; Dane
Wilhelm Küper	Inspector General of food service		
Otto Kumm	Commander 7th SS Volunteer Mountain Division "Prinz Eugen"; Commander 1st SS Panzer Division "Leibstandarte SS Adolf Hitler"	1909–2004	also: Generalmajor der Waffen-SS
Franz Kutschera	Deputy and Acting Gauleiter NSDAP Carinthia; SS- und Polizeiführer "Mogilev;" "Warsaw"	1904–1944	assassinated in Warsaw
Ernst Ludwig Leyser	Deputy Gauleiter, Gau Westmark; Generalkommissar, Zhytomyr; Landeshauptmann, Province of Nassau	1896–1973	
Gustav Lombard	Commander 8th SS Cavalry Division "Florian Geyer"	1895–1992	also: Generalmajor der Waffen-SS
Johann-Erasmus Freiherr von Malsen-Ponickau	SS- und Polizeigebietkommandeur "Istrien;" Police President: Frankfurt am Oder, Posen, Halle	1895–1956	imprisoned seven years in Poland
Günther Merk	SS- und Polizeiführer "Charkow;" Commander of Ordnungspolizei in Krakau	1888–1947	also: Generalmajor der Polizei; executed by firing squad in the Soviet Union
Kurt Meyer	Commander 12th SS Panzer Division "Hitlerjugend"	1910–1961	also: Generalmajor der Waffen-SS
Wilhelm Mohnke	Commander 1st SS Panzer Division "Leibstandarte SS Adolf Hitler"; Commander of the government quarter for the Battle in Berlin	1911–2001	also: Generalmajor der Waffen-SS
Hinrich Möller	Police Chief of Neumünster; Police Director of Flensburg; SS and Police Leader, "Estland"	1906–1974	also: Generalmajor der Polizei; imprisoned for murder
Kurt-Peter Müller	Corps physician V SS Mountain Corps	1894–1993	also: Generalmajor der Waffen-SS
Erich Naumann	Commander, Einsatzgruppen VI & B; SiPo & SD Commander, Netherlands	1905–1951	also: Generalmajor der Polizei; hanged at Landsberg prison for war crimes
Werner Naumann	State Secretary, Propaganda Ministry; Vice President, Reich Chamber of Culture	1909–1982	
Walther Neblich	Commander SS-Automotive training center		
Hans Nieland	Head of the Nazi Party/Foreign Organization, 1931–1933; Hamburg Senator; Mayor of Dresden	1900–1976	
Walther Oberhaidacher	Gauleiter of Styria; Police President of Bochum and Dresden	1896–1945	also: Generalmajor der Polizei
Karl von Oberkamp	SS-Führungshauptamt, Inspector In2 and In6	1893–1947	also: Generalmajor der Waffen-SS; hanged in Belgrade for war crimes
Hans Plesch	Police President of Munich, 1943–1945	1905–1985	also: Generalmajor der Polizei
Ernst Rode	Chief of staff to the Chef Bandenkampfverbände (Chief of formations to break up bands)	1894–1955	also: Generalmajor der Waffen-SS
Bruno Rothardt	Corps physician II SS Panzer Corps		
Ludwig Ruckdeschel	Deputy and Acting Gauleiter NSDAP Bayreuth	1907–1986	
Joachim Rumohr	Commander 8th SS Cavalry Division "Florian Geyer"	1910–1945	also: Generalmajor der Waffen-SS; suicide
Ferdinand von Sammern-Frankenegg	Acting SSPF, Warsaw District; Polizeigebietsführer Esseg	1897–1944	also: Generalmajor der Polizei; killed in action
Karl Schäfer	SS- und Polizeiführer "Weissruthenien;" "Dnjepropetrowsk-Krivoi-Rog"	1892–1943	also: Generalmajor der Polizei; killed in action
Walther Schellenberg	Head of Amt-VI: SD-Ausland (Foreign Intelligence)	1910–1952	also: Generalmajor der Polizei
Fritz Schmedes	Commander 4th SS Polizei Panzergrenadier Division	1894–1952	also: Generalmajor der Waffen-SS und der Polizei
August Schmidhuber	Commander 21st Waffen Mountain Division of the SS "Skanderbeg"	1901–1947	also: Generalmajor der Waffen-SS; hanged in Belgrade for war crimes
Eberhard Schöngarth (also: Karl Eberhard Schöngarth)	Commander of Einsatzgruppe z.b.V.; SiPo and SD Commander in the General Government and the Netherlands; Acting Higher SS and Police Leader, "Nordwest"	1903–1946	also: Generalmajor der Polizei; hanged in Germany for war crimes
Otto Schottenheim	Staff SS-Oberabschnitt (SS Supreme Sector) Main burgomaster of Regensburg	1890–1980	
Walther Schröder	Police President of Lübeck (1933–1945); SS and Police Leader, "Lettland;" "Estland"	1902–1973	also: Generalmajor der Polizei
Franz Schwarz	Staff SS-Oberabschnitt South	1899–1960	
Hans Schwedler	SS- und Polizeiführer "Krakau;" Inspector of SS-Totenkopfstandarten; SS-Führungshauptamt	1878–1945	also: Generalmajor der Waffen-SS; suicide.
Franz Six (also: Franz Alfred Six)	Reichssicherheitshauptamt; Head of Amt-VII: Ideological Research and Evaluation	1909–1975	also: Generalmajor der Waffen-SS; imprisoned
Johannes Soodla	Estonian Legion	1897–1965	
Ludwig Steeg	Oberbürgermeister and Stadtpräsident (City President) of Berlin	1894 – 1945	
Karl Taus	SS- und Polizeiführer "Görz"	1893–1977	
Willy Tensfeld	SS- und Polizeiführer "Charkow;" "Stalino-Donezgebeit;" "Oberitalien-West"	1893–1982	also: Generalmajor der Polizei
Theobald Thier	SS- und Polizeiführer "Kuban;" "Kerch-Taman;" "Lemberg;" "Kraków"	1897–1949	also: Generalmajor der Polizei; sentenced to death in Kraków for war crimes
Fritz Tittmann	SS- und Polizeiführer "Nikolajew;" SS-Plenipotentiary for Volksdeutsche issues	1898–1945	Died in unclear circumstances in April 1945
August-Willhelm Trabandt	Commander 18th SS Volunteer Panzergrenadier Division "Horst Wessel"	1891–1968	also: Generalmajor der Waffen-SS
Friedrich Tscharmann	SS-Führungshauptamt	1871–1945	also: Generalmajor der Waffen-SS
Herbert-Ernst Vahl	SS-Führungshauptamt, Inspector of SS Armoured troops	1896–1944	also: Generalmajor der Waffen-SS; died in a car accident
Anton Vogler	SS-Commanding officer of Munich	1882–1961	
Bernhard Voss	SS-Führungshauptamt		
Jürgen Wagner	Commander 4th SS Volunteer Panzer Grenadier Brigade "Nederland"	1901–1947	also: Generalmajor der Waffen-SS; executed by firing squad in Belgrade for war crimes
Theodor Wisch	Commander 1st SS Panzer Division "Leibstandarte SS Adolf Hitler"	1907–1995	also: Generalmajor der Waffen-SS
Fritz Witt	Commander 12th SS Panzer Division "Hitlerjugend"	1908–1944	also: Generalmajor der Waffen-SS; killed in action
Gustav Adolf von Wulffen (also: Gustav-Adolf von Wulffen)	Stab Reichsführer-SS; Commander Infantry-Division "Potsdam"	1878–1945	also: Generalmajor der Wehrmacht; killed in action
Lucian Wysocki	Police President of Oberhausen; Mülheim an der Ruhr; Duisburg; Kassel; SS- und Polizeiführer "Generalbezirk Litauen"	1899–1964	also: Generalmajor der Polizei
August Zehender	Commander 22nd SS Volunteer Cavalry Division Maria Theresia	1903–1945	also: Generalmajor der Waffen-SS; killed in action
Carl Zenner	Police President of Aachen; SS- und Polizeiführer "Weissruthenien"	1899–1969	also: Generalmajor der Polizei; convicted war criminal
Joachim Ziegler	Commander 11th SS Volunteer Panzergrenadier Division "Nordland"	1904–1945	also: Generalmajor der Waffen-SS; killed in action
Paul Zimmermann	SS- und Polizeiführer "Nikolajew"	1895–1980	also: Generalmajor der Polizei

== See also ==
- Comparative ranks of Nazi Germany
- Generaloberst (Nazi Germany)
- List of Nazi Party leaders and officials

== Sources ==
- Andreas Schulz, Günter Wegmann, Dieter Zinke: Die Generale der Waffen-SS und der Polizei 1933–1945. Biblio-Verlag, Bissendorf 2003 ff., ISBN 3-7648-2528-6. (in 6 volumes).
  - Volume 1: A–G (Abraham–Gutenberger), Bissendorf 2003, ISBN 3-7648-2373-9
  - Volume 2: H–K (Hachtel–Kutschera), Bissendorf 2005, ISBN 3-7648-2592-8
  - Volume 3: LA–PL (Lammerding–Plesch), Bissendorf 2008, ISBN 3-7648-2375-5
  - Volume 4: PO–SCHI (Podzun–Schimana), Bissendorf 2009, ISBN 3-7648-2587-1
  - Volume 5: SCHL–T (Schlake–Turner), Bissendorf 2011, ISBN 3-7648-3209-6
  - Volume 6: U-Z (Ullmann–Zottmann), Bissendorf 2012, ISBN 3-7648-3202-9
- Wolfgang Graf: Österreichische SS-Generale, Himmlers verlässliche Vasallen. Hermagoras-Verlag, Klagenfurt / Ljubljana / Wien 2012, ISBN 978-3-7086-0578-4
