= Richard Jungclaus =

Higher SS and Police Leader, SS-Obergruppenführer

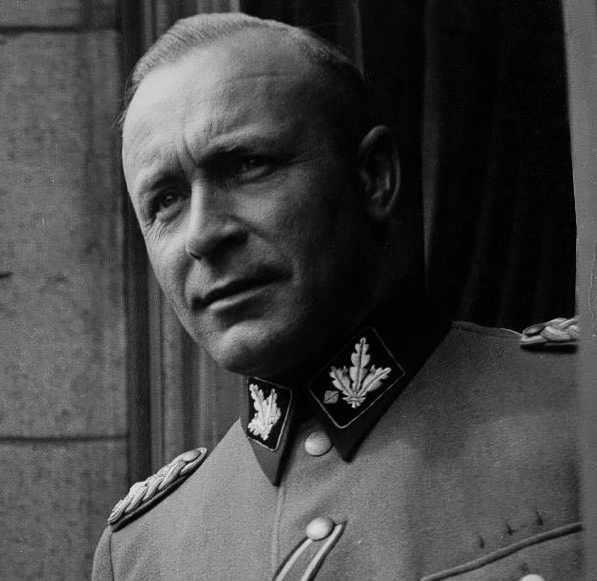
- Jungclaus, c. 1944–45
- Born: 17 March 1905; Freiburg, Grand Duchy of Baden, German Empire
- Died: 14 April 1945 (age 40); Zavidovići, Independent State of Croatia
- Military career
- Allegiance: Nazi Germany
- Branch: Schutzstaffel; Waffen-SS
- Service years: 1931–1945
- Rank: SS-Gruppenführer and Generalleutnant of Police
- Commands: Higher SS and Police Leader, Belgien-Nordfrankreich
- Conflicts: World War II
- Awards: Iron Cross, 2nd class War Merit Cross, 1st and 2nd class with swords

Richard Jungclaus (17 March 1905 - 14 April 1945) was a German SS-Gruppenführer and Generalleutnant of Police who served as the Higher SS and Police Leader (HSSPF) in Belgium and Northern France. A member of the Waffen-SS, he was killed in combat in the Independent State of Croatia toward the end of the Second World War.

== Early life and career ==
Jungclaus was born in Freiburg, the son of a merchant. After his schooling, he completed an apprenticeship as a textile salesman and took over his father's business where he was employed until 1934. He joined the Nazi Party (member number 305,661) and the Sturmabteilung (SA) in 1930. He was promoted to an SA-Sturmführer in early 1931 and switched from the SA to the Schutzstaffel (SS) on 29 April 1931 (SS number 7,368), entering that organization at the same rank.

He held lower level command positions until June 1935 when he took a staff posting as adjutant to August Heissmeyer, the head of the SS Main Office in Berlin. From October 1937 to November 1938, he was commander of the 12th SS-Standarte headquartered in Hanover. He was then advanced to command of SS-Abschnitt (District) IV, also based in Hanover, and served in that capacity until 1 April 1942.

== War years ==
Jungclaus joined the Waffen-SS in at the end of December 1939 and, after completing training, was commissioned an Untersturmführer in May 1940. He served with the 11th and 4th Totenkopfstandarten until April 1941 and then with the Regiment Westland of the 5th SS Panzer Division Wiking until September. From September 1941 to April 1942, he worked as an advisor to the Dutch SS. Then, until August 1944, he helped establish and direct the Flemish SS in Brussels, under the eponymous Dienststelle Jungclaus (Department Jungclaus).

From 18 July 1944 to 16 September 1944, Jungclaus was the Higher SS and Police Leader (HSSPF) Belgien-Nordfrankreich. He was the first holder of this position. In addition, from 11 August 1944 he was the Wehrmachtbefehlshaber (military commander) of all Wehrmacht forces in Belgium and Northern France. Confronted with the rapidly advancing offensive of Allied forces following the D-Day invasion, he immediately began the process of transporting prisoners to concentration camps, including Buchenwald, Ravensbrück, Neuengamme and Sachsenhausen. A total of eight train transports were organized between 8 August and 4 September, totaling over 5,400 people. One of the last of these trains contained over 1,370 political prisoners, including over 50 Allied airmen, and has come to be known as the Nazi ghost train. Threatened with attacks by the Belgian resistance on Wehrmacht hospital trains unless he ordered the train back to Brussels, and needing all available transport to evacuate German forces, Jungclaus relented. The train returned and the prisoners were released to the International Red Cross the same day that the British Army entered the city.

Jungclaus was subsequently relieved of his position personally by Heinrich Himmler on 16 September. Temporarily placed in a staff position, he was transferred back to the Waffen-SS for front line duty with the 7th SS Volunteer Mountain Division "Prinz Eugen" in December 1944, and died in combat operations in Zavidovići in the Independent State of Croatia (today, in Bosnia and Herzegovina) on 14 April 1945. During the war, he was awarded the Iron Cross, 2nd class and the War Merit Cross, 1st and 2nd class with swords.

== SS and police ranks ==
SS and police ranks
Date	Rank
29 April 1931	SS-Untersturmführer
1 October 1932	SS-Sturmhauptführer
20 April 1935	SS-Sturmbannführer
11 November 1936	SS-Obersturmbannführer
12 September 1937	SS-Standartenführer
29 December 1939	Scharführer der Reserve (Waffen-SS)
15 January 1940	Oberscharführer der Reserve (Waffen-SS)
1 May 1940	Untersturmführer der Reserve (Waffen-SS)
1 August 1940	Obersturmführer der Reserve (Waffen-SS)
1 October 1941	SS-Oberführer
20 April 1942	SS-Brigadeführer
30 July 1943	Generalmajor of police
9 November 1943	SS-Gruppenführer and Generalleutnant of police

== Sources ==
- Klee, Ernst (2007). Das Personenlexikon zum Dritten Reich. Wer war was vor und nach 1945. Frankfurt-am-Main: Fischer-Taschenbuch-Verlag. ISBN 978-3-596-16048-8.
- Miller, Michael D.; Schulz, Andreas (2015). Leaders of the SS & German Police. Vol. 2 Reichsführer SS – Gruppenführer (Hans Haltermann to Walter Kruger). R. James Bender Publishing. ISBN 978-1-932-97025-8.
- Yerger, Mark C. (1997). Allgemeine-SS: The Commands, Units and Leaders of the General SS. Schiffer Publishing Ltd. ISBN 0-7643-0145-4.

== Other reading ==
- Bettina Birn: Die Hoheren SS- und Polizeifiihrer: Himmlers Vertreter im Reich und in den besetzten Gebieten (1986). Droste Verlag. ISBN 978-3-77000-710-3
- Chris McNab: The SS: 1923–1945 (2009). London: Amber Books ISBN 978-1-90662-649-5
