= Obergruppenführer =

Paramilitary rank in Nazi Germany

- Post April 1942 gorget patch

- Shoulder and camo insignia
- Country: Nazi Germany
- Service branch: Schutzstaffel; Sturmabteilung; National Socialist Motor Corps National Socialist Flyers Corps
- Abbreviation: Ogruf
- Next higher rank: SS-Oberst-Gruppenführer (SS); Stabschef (SA); Korpsführer (NSFK & NSKK)
- Next lower rank: Gruppenführer
- Equivalent ranks: General der Waffengattung

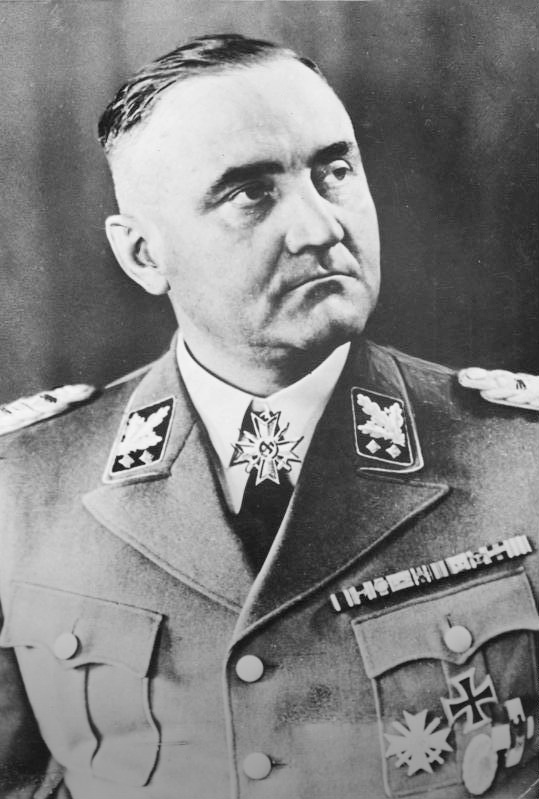
Gottlob Berger, chief of the SS Main Office, wearing the post-April-1942 version of the SS-Obergruppenführer rank insignia

Obergruppenführer (German: [ˈoːbɐˌɡʁʊpm̩fyːʁɐ], lit. 'senior group leader') was a paramilitary rank in Nazi Germany that was first created in 1932 as a rank of the Sturmabteilung (SA) and adopted by the Schutzstaffel (SS) one year later. Until April 1942, it was the highest commissioned rank after only Reichsführer-SS. Translated as "senior group leader", the rank of Obergruppenführer was senior to Gruppenführer. A similarly named rank of Untergruppenführer existed in the SA from 1929 to 1930 and as a title until 1933. In April 1942, the new rank of SS-Oberst-Gruppenführer was created which was above Obergruppenführer and below Reichsführer-SS.

== Creation and history ==
The rank of Obergruppenführer was created in 1932 by Ernst Röhm and was intended as a seniormost rank of the Nazi stormtroopers for use by Röhm and his top SA generals. In its initial concept, the rank was intended to be held by members of the Oberste SA-Führung (Supreme SA Command) and also by veteran commanders of certain SA-Gruppen (SA groups). Some of the early promotions to the rank included Ernst Röhm, Viktor Lutze, Edmund Heines, August Schneidhuber, and Fritz Ritter von Kraußer.

The rank of SA-Obergruppenführer was the most senior rank of the Sturmabteilung until the spring of 1933, when Röhm made the title position of Stabschef (SA Chief of Staff) into a rank and promoted himself accordingly.

Also in the summer of 1933, Heinrich Himmler was promoted by Adolf Hitler to the newly created rank of SS-Obergruppenführer with the intent being to make Himmler the equivalent of the senior commanders of the SA, to which the SS was still subordinated. Although Himmler usually referred to himself as Reichsführer-SS, before the summer of 1934, this was simply a title for the SS commander, and not yet an actual rank. Shortly after Himmler's promotion, Hitler further promoted Franz Xaver Schwarz, with Himmler's date of rank backdated to 1 January 1933 in order to confirm his seniority as the top officer within the SS. Shortly after Rudolf Hess was appointed as his deputy in April 1933, Hitler promoted him to SS-Obergruppenführer. However, in September, Hitler decreed that Hess should no longer use the title of Obergruppenführer but only use the title of Deputy Führer.

A number of men were promoted to SS-Obergruppenführer in 1934, these being Fritz Weitzel, Richard Walther Darré and Walter Buch. After the Night of the Long Knives in July 1934, Sepp Dietrich was promoted to the rank. On 9 September 1934, so as to prevent a power struggle within the SS, Hitler further promoted Kurt Daluege who commanded most of the SS in the Berlin region. Daluege's promotion was to avoid the SS splitting into two separate entities, one based in Northern Germany under Daluege and the other in Bavaria under Himmler. This early SS disunity became a non-issue after a common ground was found amongst SS leaders in their general hatred of the SA.

Udo von Woyrsch and Friedrich-Wilhelm Krüger were promoted to SS-Obergruppenführer in 1935 while Josias, Hereditary Prince of Waldeck and Pyrmont, and Max Amann received the rank a year later along with Karl von Eberstein and Philipp Bouhler. The year 1936 saw several promotions to the rank, including Friedrich Jeckeln who would become one of the most infamous SS and police leaders on the Eastern Front during World War II. The last pre-war promotion to the rank of SS-Obergruppenführer was in April 1939 for Friedrich Graf von der Schulenburg who died the following month. Upon the outbreak of World War II, there were seventeen men who held the rank of SS-Obergruppenführer.

== Promotion history ==
Promotions to Obergruppenführer by year
Year	No.	Names
1933	3	Heinrich Himmler, Rudolf Hess, Franz Xaver Schwarz
1934	5	Sepp Dietrich, Fritz Weitzel, Kurt Daluege, Richard Walther Darré, Walter Buch
1935	2	Udo von Woyrsch, Friedrich-Wilhelm Krüger
1936	8	Josias, Prince of Waldeck and Pyrmont, Max Amann, Karl von Eberstein, Philipp Bouhler, Wolf-Heinrich von Helldorff, Friedrich Jeckeln, Werner Lorenz, August Heissmeyer
1937	1	Ernst-Heinrich Schmauser
1938	0	
1939	1	Friedrich Graf von der Schulenburg
1940	3	Joachim von Ribbentrop, Martin Bormann, Hans Lammers
1941	9	Otto Dietrich, Arthur Seyss-Inquart, Reinhard Heydrich, Paul Hausser, Hans-Adolf Prützmann, Erich von dem Bach-Zelewski, Wilhelm Rediess, Wilhelm Reinhard, Albert Forster
1942	20	Karl Kaufmann, Friedrich Hildebrandt, Karl Fiehler, Dietrich Klagges, Paul Körner, Wilhelm Murr, Fritz Sauckel, Richard Hildebrandt, Wilhelm Koppe, Theodor Berkelmann, Wilhelm Keppler, Karl Wolff, Josef Bürckel, Arthur Greiser, Theodor Eicke, Emil Mazuw, Paul Scharfe, Oswald Pohl, Walter Schmitt, Herbert Backe
1943	23	Siegfried Taubert, Joachim Albrecht Eggeling, Ernst Wilhelm Bohle, Konstantin von Neurath, Julius Schaub, Günther Pancke, Ernst Kaltenbrunner, Konrad Henlein, Ernst Sachs, Karl Hermann Frank, August Eigruber, Friedrich Rainer, Hugo Jury, Rudolf Querner, Friedrich Alpers, Gottlob Berger, Otto Hofmann, Hanns Albin Rauter, Hans Jüttner, Artur Phleps, Felix Steiner, Alfred Wünnenberg, Karl Pfeffer-Wildenbruch
1944	32	Hartmann Lauterbacher, Karl Hanke, Ulrich Greifelt, Wilhelm Stuckart, Otto Winkelmann, Hermann Höfle, Ernst-Robert Grawitz, Leonardo Conti, Franz Breithaupt, Werner Best, Maximilian von Herff, Georg Keppler, Walter Krüger, Karl Maria Demelhuber, Kurt Knoblauch, Curt von Gottberg, Oskar Schwerk, Heinrich von Maur, Karl Wahl, Fritz Wächtler, Jürgen von Kamptz, Erwin Rösener, Benno Martin, Gustav Adolf Scheel, Paul Wegener, Karl Gutenberger, Carl Oberg, Wilhelm Bittrich, Matthias Kleinheisterkamp, August Frank, Fritz Schlessmann, Herbert Gille
1945	1	Hans Kammler

During the Second World War, there were 88 promotions to the rank, of which 22 were considered regular officers of the Waffen-SS and the rest members of the Allgemeine SS. The first wartime promotions to SS-Obergruppenführer occurred in April 1940 when the rank was granted to Joachim von Ribbentrop, Martin Bormann and Hans Lammers; Arthur Seyss-Inquart and Otto Dietrich were promoted a year later. All five promotions were honorary SS ranks with the first promotion of an active SS officer occurring in September 1941 when the rank was granted to Reinhard Heydrich. The Waffen-SS commander, Paul Hausser was promoted to the rank of SS-Obergruppenführer on 1 October 1941. Waffen-SS commander Theodor Eicke was promoted to SS-Obergruppenführer und General der Waffen-SS on 20 April 1942. Sepp Dietrich remained senior, having served as General der SS-VT (SS-Verfügungstruppe) upon the outbreak of World War II in 1939.

Two SS officers would be demoted from the rank of SS-Obergruppenführer: Rudolf Hess and Wolf-Heinrich Graf von Helldorff. Hess was stripped of his rank and expelled from both the SS and Nazi Party after his abortive flight to Scotland in 1941. Helldorff was stricken from the SS rolls in 1944 after the 20 July plot against Hitler. Helldorff was a unique case, in that his SS rank had been bestowed for technical reasons in order to command the Berlin Police. While holding SA membership, Helldorff was never actually an SS member although for administrative purposes he held SS rank and was ranked as the 15th most senior SS officer.

A total of 107 men would eventually hold the rank of SS-Obergruppenführer with 97 such officers listed on the SS seniority list in 1944. Several men with the rank would die during World War II; some of the more notable being Heydrich, Eicke, and Artur Phleps. The last promotion was made in March 1945 to Hans Kammler.

== Rank usage ==
The rank of Obergruppenführer was used by four major paramilitary groups of the Nazi Party, these being the SA, SS, National Socialist Motor Corps, and National Socialist Flyers Corps. The rank would remain the highest SS general officer rank until April 1942, when the rank of SS-Oberst-Gruppenführer was created.

Standard practice for SS generals serving as an SS and police leader, as well as those senior SS personnel of the RSHA, was to hold dual police rank as SS-Obergruppenführer und General der Polizei. SS-Obergruppenführer und General der Waffen-SS was the equivalent in the armed SS; in 1944, most active SS generals received this designation in order to command military troops during the last days of the war. Approximately fifteen SS generals were ranked as SS-Obergruppenführer und General der Polizei und Waffen-SS.

SS-Obergruppenführer was considered the highest rank of the Allgemeine SS until April 1942; equivalent to a lieutenant general (three-star general) in the American and British armies. It was only outranked by Himmler's special rank of Reichsführer-SS. However, within the Waffen-SS, the rank of SS-Gruppenführer was equivalent to a Generalleutnant, and an SS-Obergruppenführer came to be considered the equivalent of a General; holders were titled in full SS-Obergruppenführer und General der Waffen-SS.

== Rank insignia ==
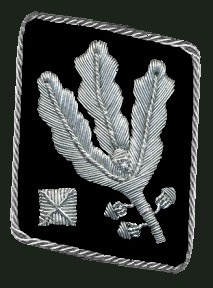
Gorget patch
until April 1942
(Allgemeine SS and Waffen-SS)

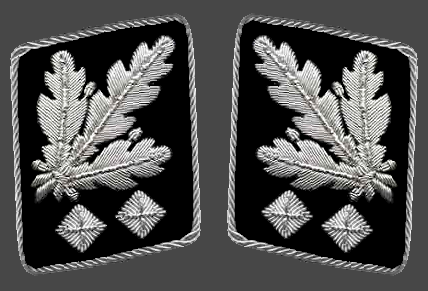
Gorget patches
1942–1945
(Allgemeine SS and Waffen-SS)

Shoulder board
(Waffen-SS)

Camouflage
(Waffen-SS)

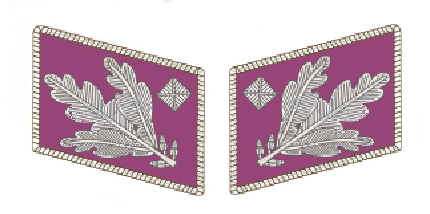
SA Gorget patches

NSFK Gorget patch

NSKK Gorget patch

Junior rank Gruppenführer	SS rank Obergruppenführer	Senior rank SS-Oberst-Gruppenführer
Junior rank Gruppenführer	SA rank Obergruppenführer	Senior rank Stabschef

== See also ==
- Corps colours (Waffen-SS)
- List of SS-Obergruppenführer
- List of SA-Obergruppenführer
- Table of ranks and insignia of the Waffen-SS

== Bibliography ==
- Biondi, Robert (2000). SS Officers List: SS-Standartenführer to SS-Oberstgruppenführer (As of 30 January 1942). Schiffer Publishing. ISBN 978-0764310614.
- Evans, Richard J. (2008). The Third Reich at War. New York: Penguin Group. ISBN 978-0-14-311671-4.
- Flaherty, T. H. (2004) [1988]. The Third Reich: The SS. Time-Life Books, Inc. ISBN 1-84447-073-3.
- Haskew, Michael (2011). The Wehrmacht. Amber Books Ltd. ISBN 978-1-907446-95-5.
- Kershaw, Ian (2008). Hitler: A Biography. New York: W. W. Norton & Company. ISBN 978-0-393-06757-6.
- Lang, Jochen von (1979). The Secretary. Martin Bormann: The Man Who Manipulated Hitler. New York: Random House. ISBN 978-0-394-50321-9.
- McNab, Chris (2009). The SS: 1923–1945. Amber Books Ltd. ISBN 978-1-906626-49-5.
- McNab, Chris (2009b). The Third Reich. Amber Books Ltd. ISBN 978-1-906626-51-8.
- Miller, Michael (2015). Leaders of the SS and German Police, Vol. 2. San Jose, CA: R. James Bender. ISBN 978-1-932970-25-8.
- SS service records of Karl Wolff, Reinhard Heydrich, and Ernst Kaltenbrunner: National Archives and Records Administration, College Park, Maryland
- Stein, George (2002) [1966]. The Waffen-SS: Hitler's Elite Guard at War 1939–1945. Cerberus Publishing. ISBN 978-1841451008.
- Williams, Max (2015). SS Elite: The Senior Leaders of Hitler's Praetorian Guard, Vol. 1 (A-J). Fonthill Media LLC. ISBN 978-1-78155-433-3.
- Williams, Max (2018). SS Elite: The Senior Leaders of Hitler's Praetorian Guard. Vol. 3. Fonthill Media LLC. ISBN 978-1-781-55638-2.
- Zentner, Christian; Bedürftig, Friedemann (1997) [1991]. The Encyclopedia of the Third Reich. New York: Da Capo Press. ISBN 978-0-3068079-3-0.
