= Oskar Schwerk =

German Generalmajor and SS-Obergruppenfuhrer

- Born: 16 July 1869; Hünern, Kingdom of Prussia
- Died: 14 November 1950 (aged 81)
- Military career
- Allegiance: German Empire; Weimar Republic; Nazi Germany
- Branch: Imperial German Army; Reichswehr; Waffen-SS
- Service years: 1887–1919; 1936–1945
- Rank: SS-Obergruppenführer
- Conflicts: World War I World War II

Oskar Schwerk (born 16 July 1869 in Hünern, Trebnitz district; died 14 November 1950) was a German Generalmajor and SS-Obergruppenfuhrer.

== World War I ==
Oskar Schwerk was the son of a pastor and attended the Elisabet Gymnasium in Breslau. On 15 October 1887 he joined the 3rd Lower Silesian Infantry Regiment No. 50 of the Prussian Army in Rawitsch as a cadet. On 15 January 1889 he was promoted to second lieutenant. On 27 January 1896 he was promoted to first lieutenant and soon promoted again to regimental adjutant. On 1 April 1897 Schwerk was transferred to the 154th Infantry Regiment in Jauer and became the adjutant. On 12 September 1902 he was promoted to Hauptmann (captain) with the 31st Infantry Brigade in Trier. On 27 January 1905 he was appointed company commander in the Infantry Regiment "Herwarth von Bittenfeld" (1st Westphalian) No. 13 in Münster. Schwerk was soon promoted to major and became the adjutant of the 2nd Division in Insterburg on 21 February 1911. He held this position for the next three years and was made commander of the III on 22 March 1914.

Went the outbreak of World War I, Schwerk fought with this regiment in Neufchâteau, France. He took part in the battles at Varennes-en-Argonne, Fleury-devant-Douaumont and Reims. On 12 November 1914 Schwerk became commander of the 4th Lower Silesian Infantry Regiment No. 51 and took part with the 11th Division in the Winter First Battle of Champagne, then join the First Battle of Artois, then the Battle of La Bassée and Battle of Arras. In 1917 he transferred to trench warfare near the Battle of the Somme and Frize. On 27 January 1916 Schwerk was promoted to Oberstleutnant (lieutenant colonel) and took part in the Battle of the Somme, and was awarded the Prussian bravery award, the Pour le Mérite on 21 September 1916.

In the spring of 1917, Schwerk and his regiment were engaged in heavy defensive fighting in the Tilloy-lès-Mofflaines, Pas-de-Calais sector. In the Battle of Arras Schwerk was wounded by British artillery fire on 10 April 1917. His left leg was amputated. For his personal commitment, he was awarded the Pour le Mérite Oak Leaves on 2 May 1917, as a first regiment commander. After his recovery he was appointed inspector of the military penal institutions on 18 January 1918, and promoted to Oberst (colonel) on 15 July 1918. In September 1918 he was appointed as commander of Berlin.

== Interwar period ==
With the end of the German Empire and the start of the German Republic, on 9 November 1918 Schwerk stepped down and his successor was Otto Wels. Schwerk was transferred to Breslau and appointed inspector of the local militia Landwehr inspection and was head of the Sicherheitspolize (security police) in Silesia, Poland. He retired from active military service on 31 January 1920. In retirement, Schwerk became the chairman of the officers' association of the former 4th Lower Silesian Infantry Regiment No. 51 and leader of the Provincial Warriors' Association for Silesia. He also became a leader in the Sturmabteilung (SA) Reserve II in Silesia, and was promoted to the rank of Standartenfuhrer.

== World War 2 ==
Schwerk joined the Nazi Party in May 1937 (membership number 5,420,196) and became a member of the Schutzstaffel (SS number 276,825). He was promoted through the ranks, reaching the rank of SS-Obergruppenfuhrer on 16 July 1944. He also was the Regional Leader of the Southeast Nationalsocialist Reich Warriors Association, (NS-Reichskriegerbund) and also the Gaufuhrer for the Southeast Reichskriegerbund in the city of Wrocław.

== Ranks ==
Ranks and dates

- SS-Obergruppenführer: 1 September 1944
- SS-Gruppenführer: 9 November 1942
- "Charakter" (honorary title) of Generalmajor a.D.: 27 August 1939
- SS-Brigadeführer: 20 April 1939
- SS-Oberführer: 20 April 1937
- SS-Standartenführer: 13 September 1936
- Oberst: 15 July 1918
- Oberstleutnant: 27 January 1916
- Major: 21 February 1911
- Hauptmann: 12 September 1902
- Premierleutnant: 1 September 1896 - 27 January 1886
- Sekondeleutnant: 15 January 1889
- Fahnenjunker: 15 October 1887

== Awards ==
- Pour le Mérite Oak Leaves
- Tannenbergtag Awards as Character of Major General on 27 August 1939

== See also ==
- Register of SS leaders in general's rank
