= Ernst Otto Fick =

German general

Ernst Otto Fick (5 February 1898 in Kirchdorf an der Iller – 29 April 1945 in Murnau am Staffelsee) was a German SS Brigade Leader (SS Brigadeführer) and Major General of the Waffen-SS.

== Early life ==
Ernst Otto Fick was born in Kirchdorf an der Iller, the son of Gustav Adolf Fick (13 March 1867 – 21 March 1950) and his wife Bertha (maiden name Jakob; 28 May 1871 – 24 February 1917). On 29 April 1934, he married stenographer Gertraud Dapperger (21 March 1914 – 20 February 2010).

Fick volunteered for military service in 1915 while still in school and participated during World War I. After the war he joined the Freikorps (German volunteer military units). From 1919 to 1931, he ran a branch of his father's general store and was also the administrator of his parents' property. In 1928 he became a member of the Nazi Party NSDAP (membership number 124.087). When his parents' business went bankrupt, he joined the Schutzstaffel (SS No. 2,853) and worked full-time as a consultant for the staff of the Reichsführer-SS and as an instructor for the SS-Verfügungstruppe, combat troops for the Nazi Party reporting directly to Adolf Hitler and precursor to the Waffen-SS. From spring 1935 to 1937 he was a member of the staff at RuSHA (Rasse- und Siedlungshauptamt, the "Race and Settlement Main Office"). A fervent exponent of Nazi ideology, he taught classes at the SS Junkerschule Bad Tölz and at the SS Junkerschule Braunschweig until 1939.

== World War II ==
During the Second World War, Fick served in the artillery regiment of the 5th SS Panzer Division Wiking from May to August 1941, which took part in Operation Barbarossa, the invasion of the Soviet Union. It is unclear if he was the unit's commander or simply its ideological observer. Conflict with the regiment's commander, SS-Standartenführer Herbert Gille, led to Fick's subsequent removal from the Eastern Front and reassignment as commandant of the SS-Ausbildungslager (ideological training camp) at Sennheim in June 1942. Located in Alsace-Lorraine in eastern France, the camp trained mostly foreign recruits to the Waffen-SS. From the beginning of January 1944 until his death he was an inspector for ideological education for the entire SS and police. In addition, he was Amtsgruppenchef (office group C) in the SS main office.

Fick was shot and killed with his driver by soldiers of the US Army on 29 April 1945 during the liberation of Oflag VII A (a German Army POW camp for Polish Army officers).

== See also ==
- Register of SS leaders in general's rank
