= Ernst Sachs (SS-Obergruppenführer) =

German SS-Obergruppenführer

- Born: 24 December 1880; Berlin, Kingdom of Prussia, German Empire
- Died: 23 August 1956 (aged 75); Bad Wildbad, Baden-Württemberg, West Germany
- Military career
- Allegiance: German Empire; Weimar Republic; Nazi Germany
- Branch: Imperial German Army; Reichswehr; Schutzstaffel
- Service years: 1900–1918; 1919–1936; 1936–1945
- Rank: Hauptmann; Generalleutnant; SS-Obergruppenführer and General of the Waffen-SS
- Commands: Chief of Telecommunications, Personal Staff Reichsführer-SS
- Awards: Iron Cross, 1st and 2nd class War Merit Cross, 1st and 2nd class with Swords

Ernst Sachs (24 December 1880 – 23 August 1956) was a German career military officer who later joined the SS and became its Chief of Telecommunications with the rank of SS-Obergruppenführer and General of the Waffen-SS during the Second World War.

== Early life and military career ==
Sachs was born in Berlin, the son of a postal director. When he was seven years old, the family moved to Gotha where he graduated from the gymnasium and joined the Imperial German Army as a Fahnenjunker (officer cadet) on 10 March 1900. He attended military school in Neisse, (today, Nysa, Poland) and was commissioned a Leutnant in Railway Regiment No. 1 on 18 August 1901. In October 1904, he enrolled in the Militärtechnische Akademie in Berlin where he studied electronics until July 1907. At that time, he transferred to Telegraph Battalion No. 1 in Berlin-Treptow. On 27 January 1910, he was promoted to Oberleutnant and served in the Telegraphics Inspection Office for one year beginning in October 1910. His next posting from October 1911 to October 1913 was as Adjutant of Telegraph Battalion No. 1. Promoted to Hauptmann in October 1913, he served until August 1914 as company commander in Telegraph Battalion No. 6. During the First World War, Sachs served in several posts, all with signals units. In February 1916 he became the Adjutant to the Chief of Field Telegraphy in the general headquarters of the Oberste Heeresleitung (Supreme Army Command) and then Chief of the Communications Department in the Prussian War Ministry on 15 May 1917. During the war, he was awarded the Iron Cross, 1st and 2nd class.

After the end of the war, Sachs remained in the peacetime Reichswehr as a signals officer and was involved in training of communications officers. He advanced to the ranks of Major on 5 February 1923 and Oberstleutnant on 1 November 1928. Holding several communications positions, he was made commander of the signals division of the artillery school in Jüterbog on 1 November 1930. During this assignment, he was successively promoted to the ranks of Oberst (1 April 1931) and Generalmajor (1 December 1933). On 1 October 1934, Sachs was appointed commander of the new Army Communications School at Jüterbog, which moved to Halle (Saale) in July 1935. His final promotion to Generalleutnant came on 1 October 1935, and Sachs retired from military service with this rank on 30 September 1936.

== Career in the SS ==
In February 1937, Sachs became a member of the Schutzstaffel (SS number 278,781) and was given an effective seniority date of 9 November 1936 with the rank of SS-Brigadeführer. On 1 March 1937, Reichsführer-SS Heinrich Himmler appointed him as Inspector of Communications in the SS Main Office, entrusting him with the development and management of the SS communications system. On 1 May 1937, Sachs joined the Nazi Party (membership number 4,167,008). On 1 June 1939, he was promoted to SS-Gruppenführer. From 15 May 1940, he was the President of the German Amateur Broadcasting and Receiving Service, a forerunner of the Deutscher Amateur-Radio-Club, where he strictly regulated transmission permits.

In August 1940, Sachs was made Chef des Fernmeldewesens (Chief of Telecommunications) on the Personal Staff of the Reichsführer-SS. In this post, he was placed in charge of all SS signals personnel. On his initiative in 1942, the Reichsschule für-SS-Helferinnen (Reich School for the SS-Auxiliary) was established in Oberehnheim (today, Obernai, France) to help alleviate the German wartime manpower shortage. There, female SS-Auxiliary personnel were trained to serve as telephone, radio and telex machine operators in order to release more men for combat duty. On 21 June 1943, Sachs was promoted to SS-Obergruppenführer and General of the Waffen-SS. In March 1944, he fell ill and was placed on sick leave due to nervous exhaustion. He was examined by the SS Chief Medical Officer, Reichsarzt-SS Ernst-Robert Grawitz, who determined Sachs to be unfit for duty. Sachs left office at the beginning of August 1944. However, Sachs remained active on the Personal Staff of the Reichsführer-SS as a consultant for communications.

== Postwar life ==
At the end of the war, Sachs was taken prisoner of war by the Americans. In January 1947 he was interned at Ludwigsburg and Garmisch-Partenkirchen, then underwent denazification and was categorized as a "Group II offender" in July 1948 by the court in Frankfurt. He was sentenced to 30 months in a labor camp, five years of occupational restriction and confiscation of 30% of his assets. When released, Sachs settled in Berwangen (today, Kirchardt) and he died of a heart attack at Bad Wildbad on 23 August 1956.

== Sources ==
- McNab, Chris (2009). The SS: 1923–1945. London: Amber Books. ISBN 978-1-906-62649-5.
- Mühlenberg, Jutta (2011). Das SS-Helferinnenkorps: Ausbildung, Einsatz und Entnazifizierung der weiblichen Angehörigen der Waffen-SS 1942-1949. Hamburger Edition. ISBN 978-3-868-54239-4.
- Schiffer Publishing Ltd., ed. (2000). SS Officers List: SS-Standartenführer to SS-Oberstgruppenführer (As of 30 January 1942). Schiffer Military History Publishing. ISBN 0-7643-1061-5.
- Schulz, Andreas; Wegmann, Günter; Zinke, Dieter (2008). Die Generale der Waffen-SS und der Polizei: (1933–1945). Vol. 4 (Podzun–Schimana). Bissendorf: Biblio-Verlag. ISBN 978-3-7648-2587-4.
- Williams, Max (2015). SS Elite: The Senior Leaders of Hitler's Praetorian Guard. Vol. 3. Fonthill Media LLC. ISBN 978-1-781-55638-2.
