= Curt Wittje =

Nazi politician and SS-Gruppenführer

- Born: October 2, 1894; Wandsbek, Germany
- Died: 16 March 1947 (aged 52)
- Military career
- Allegiance: German Empire; Weimar Republic; Nazi Germany
- Branch: Imperial German Army; Reichswehr; Schutzstaffel; Allgemeine-SS; Volkssturm
- Rank: SS-Gruppenführer
- Conflicts: World War I World War II

Curt Wittje, sometimes noted as Kurt Wittje (October 2, 1894, – March 16, 1947) was a Nazi politician and SS-Gruppenführer. He was a member of the Reichstag and from 1934 to 1935 head of the SS Main Office.

== World War I ==
Wittje was born in Wandsbek. His father Robert was a Geheimer Regierungsrat and, from 1903 to 1919, mayor of Detmold. Wittje joined an artillery regiment in Magdeburg as a Fahnenjunker rank and received his officer license as a Leutnant in June 1914. He took part in World War I as a battery officer, was trained as a general staff officer and was promoted to Oberleutnant in September 1917. As the war was nearing an end he was seriously wounded, and he was taken prisoner in Belgium in November 1918. He escaped and fled to Germany in March 1919. In October 1920 he served as a regimental adjutant in Allenstein; in June 1925 he was promoted to Hauptmann. In 1922 he married the 22-year-old daughter of a judicial councilor Irene Skowronski, they had two daughters.

On November 23, 1928, investigations were initiated against Wittje, claiming he sexually molested male subordinates. The Senior Public Prosecutor in Olsztyn closed the investigation, stating that there was a "lack of any abnormal disposition" and attributed the incidents to "senseless drunkenness". Wittje's superiors in the Reichswehr expelled him on May 1, 1929. His was given pension entitlements and given the right to wear his uniform on public holidays. From 1929 to April 1933, Wittje found work as head of personnel at the IREKS AG malt house in Kulmbach, where Franz Breithaupt also worked and who later became head of the main SS court office.

== World War II ==
On June 1, 1930, Wittje joined the Nazi Party (membership number 256.189) and on March 1, 1931, he became a member of the SS-Schutzstaffel (SS number 5,870). He became a promoter of the Nazi Party in the Upper Franconia district. On April 24, 1932, Wittje entered the Landtag of Bavaria (state parliament) for the Nazi Party. He resigned from the state parliament after he was elected to the Reichstag for electoral constituency 32 (Baden) on March 5, 1933, till April 1938.

Wittje was promoted within the SS in quick succession. On September 15, 1933, achieved the rank of SS-Gruppenführer. As the leader of SS-Abschnitt (district) IX for Franconia and Thuringia, he and Richard Hildebrandt tried in January 1933 to prevent the Nuremberg Gauleiter Julius Streicher from influencing the SS. In April 1933 Wittje, now serving full-time with the SS, took over the SS-Oberabschnitt (main district) North in Hamburg. He was promoted to Chief of the SS-Amt in February 1934, succeeding Siegfried Seidel-Dittmarsch who died. This office was the precursor to the SS Main Office that was formed on January 30, 1935, with Wittje remaining at its head.

Wittje became the liaison between Heinrich Himmler and Theodor Eicke and took control of the Lichtenburg concentration camp in May 1934. Wittje had conflict with the Wehrmacht over the establishment of permanent armed SS units. Wittje's view was the SS units would only “be made available for national defense purposes”. He refused to make members of the SS who had previously belonged to the Reichswehr available to the Wehrmacht. According to later information from Himmler, Reichswehr Minister, General Werner von Blomberg, informed Adolf Hitler about Wittje's position on SS units and this caused his dismissal from the Reichswehr in 1929. Hitler passed Blomberg's "information" on to Himmler in June 1934 before the Röhm Putsch. After Röhm's murder, Himmler informed Wittje about the allegations, but declined Wittje's offer of resignation. In relation to Hitler, Himmler claims to have justified his adherence to Wittje with the fact that he did not want the Wehrmacht to influence his personnel decisions in the SS.

Wittje ignored Himmler's warnings to abstain from alcohol consumption; contacts with subordinates were repeated and unwanted. On May 14, 1935, Wittje was replaced as head of the SS Main Office by August Heissmeyer. From April 1937 Wittje joined the Hamburg Waaren-Commissions-AG (WACO), which wanted to build an explosives factory near Dannenberg.

Wittje was arrested in February 1938 after further "comradeship evenings" had taken place under the observation of the Hamburg Gestapo. Himmler suspended Wittje from the SS service and set up a court of arbitration to clarify the allegations of homosexual misconduct. The arbitration court was chaired by Friedrich-Wilhelm Krüger and included the assessors Udo von Woyrsch and Theodor Eicke. With the investigation, the Hamburg Gestapo chief Bruno Linienbach and Josef Meisinger, the head of the Reich Central Office for Combating Homosexuality and Abortion, became involved. The arbitration court pleaded for Wittje to remain in the SS, but Himmler asked for him to be removed in June 1938, stating:

I was astonished that the whole drunkenness affairs of the group leader Wittje did not attract the attention of the arbitration court. […] From my personal and my office unfortunately very rich experience, I naturally consider it possible that a man is wrongly suspected of being homosexual once or twice, […] that once a man is drunk with howling misery gets and hugs other people. […] But I think it is impossible for departments of the most varied types that are locally far away from each other, […] people, always the same fact of being drunk and then falling out of role and the already so often mentioned male hugging, Kissing and hugging and putting them on record.

On November 12, 1938, Wittje was expelled from the SS. In January 1942 he was listed as a SS members who tried to acquire former Jewish companies in the Protectorate of Bohemia and Moravia in the course of Nazi Aryanization. He acquired a mechanical weaving and flax spinning mill in Eipel in the then Náchod district, with Himmler's approval.

As the war neared an end, Wittje was deployed as a battalion leader in the Volkssturm. He was arrested in Czechoslovakia in May 1945. There are two different accounts about the place and time of his death: one says he died on March 16, 1947, in Czech captivity, the other says he died on March 6, 1947, in Moscow. According to a third source, he was last seen in a Moscow prison and shot dead on March 6, 1947, in the Soviet Union after a trial before a Soviet military tribunal for war crimes at the Lichtenburg concentration camp.

== See also ==
- Register of SS leaders in general's rank
