= Jürgen von Kamptz =

SS-Obergruppenführer and police official (1891–1954

- Born: August 11, 1891; Aurich, Province of Hanover, Kingdom of Prussia, German Empire
- Died: 12 August 1954 (aged 63); Roisdorf, West Germany
- Military career
- Allegiance: German Empire; Weimar Republic; Nazi Germany
- Branch: Imperial German Army; Reichswehr; Schutzstaffel
- Rank: SS-Obergruppenführer
- Commands: Commander of the Ordnungspolizei; Protectorate of Bohemia and Moravia; Norway; Italy
- Conflicts: World War I World War II
- Awards: German Cross in Silver; Clasp to the Iron Cross, 1st and 2nd class Iron Cross (1914), 1st and 2nd class War Merit Cross, 1st and 2nd class with swords

Jürgen von Kamptz (August 11, 1891 – August 12, 1954) was a German military officer and an SS-Obergruppenführer and General of Police during World War II. He served as the commander of the Order Police in the Protectorate of Bohemia and Moravia, in Norway and in Italy.

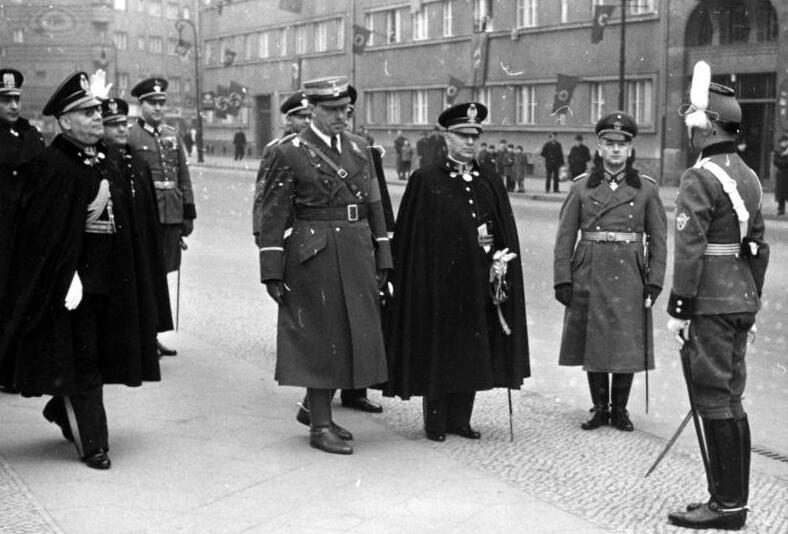
Italian police detachment in Berlin 1936, parade on Unter den Linden Ave, in front of the Berlin memorial, (4th from right) Graf Helldorff; (2nd from right) Kamptz, 1st from left: Arturo Bocchini

== Early life ==
Kamptz' parents were the senior administrative court judge Bernhard Karl Wilhelm Florus von Kamptz (March 28, 1847 – April 11, 1916) and his wife Anna Luise Henriette Elten (July 9, 1856 – June 1, 1920). After school graduation, Kamptz joined, on June 8, 1912, the 64th Infantry Regiment as an ensign and fought in World War I. In September 1918, he married Veronika, née Ayrer, with whom he would have two daughters. He ended the war with a brevet promotion to first lieutenant. After leaving the military, he joined the Prussian police service.

== SS and police career ==
In August 1932, Kamptz joined the Nazi Party (membership number 1,258,905). He worked in Department III of the Prussian Ministry of the Interior from late September 1933 to mid-June 1936. In 1936, he worked as Inspector-General of the Gendarmerie and City Police in the Ordnungspolizei main office until April 1937. From April 1937 to June 1939, Kamptz was commander of Berlin's Schutzpolizei. In March 1938, he became a member of the Schutzstaffel (SS number 292,714) with the rank of SS-Oberführer.

In June 1939, Kamptz was appointed the Befehlshaber der Ordnungspolizei or BdO (Commander of the Order Police) in the Protectorate of Bohemia and Moravia, with headquarters in Prague. From April 1941 to May 1943, he was back in the main office in Berlin as Inspector-General the Gendarmerie and the Municipal Schutzpolizei, succeeding Rudolf Querner. From June 1943 to September 1943, Kamptz was the BdO in the Reichskommissariat Norway, based in Oslo.

In September 1943, Kamptz was transferred to northern Italy as the BdO, working under Karl Wolff. There he was also responsible for Bandenbekämpfung, hunting and suppressing resistance fighters and political prisoners and organising the respective transfer to prisons and concentration camps. Working with Theodor Dannecker and Friedrich Boßhammer, Kamptz provided the security guards to deport the Jews from Italy. In August 1944, he was promoted to SS-Obergruppenführer and General of the Police. During the war, Kamptz was awarded the Clasp to the Iron Cross, 1st and 2nd class and, on February 7, 1945, the German Cross in silver.

== Post-war life ==
On April 29, 1945, Kamptz was taken prisoner of war by the Allies in Rimini. He was transferred to Island Farm Special Camp 11 in June 1947 and then to the Neuengamme internment camp in October 1947. He was released from there on April 9, 1948 and settled in Reisdorf near Bonn. Denazification proceedings in Bergedorf on April 5, 1948 sentenced Kamptz to a fine of 10,000 Reichsmarks for his membership in the SS. On appeal, the sentence was overturned and the case was remanded for a new hearing. At the end of the retrial on February 18, 1949, the Bielefeld Court of Appeals reduced the fine to 1,000 Reichsmarks.

== Ranks ==
Military, police and SS ranks with dates.

- SS-Obergruppenführer und General der Polizei: 1 August 1944
- SS-Gruppenführer: 9 November 1940
- Generalleutnant der Polizei: 20 April 1939
- Charakter als Generalleutnant der Polizei: 20 April 1939
- SS-Brigadeführer: 20 April 1939
- SS-Oberführer: 12 March 1938
- Generalmajor der Polizei: 17 June 1936
- Generalmajor der Gendarmerie: 1 April 1936
- Oberst der Gendarmerie: 5 August 1934
- Oberstleutnant der Polizei: 27 September 1933
- Major der Polizei: 23 December 1929
- Hauptmann der Polizei: 29 June 1923
- Oberleutnant der Polizei: 20 June 1921
- Leutnant der Polizei: 1 February 1920
- Charakter als Oberleutnant: 1920
- Leutnant: 17 February 1914
- Fähnrich: 8 June 1912

== See also ==
- Register of SS leaders in general's rank
- The Holocaust in Italy
