= Heinrich von Maur =

German general and SS-Obergruppenführer (1863–1947)

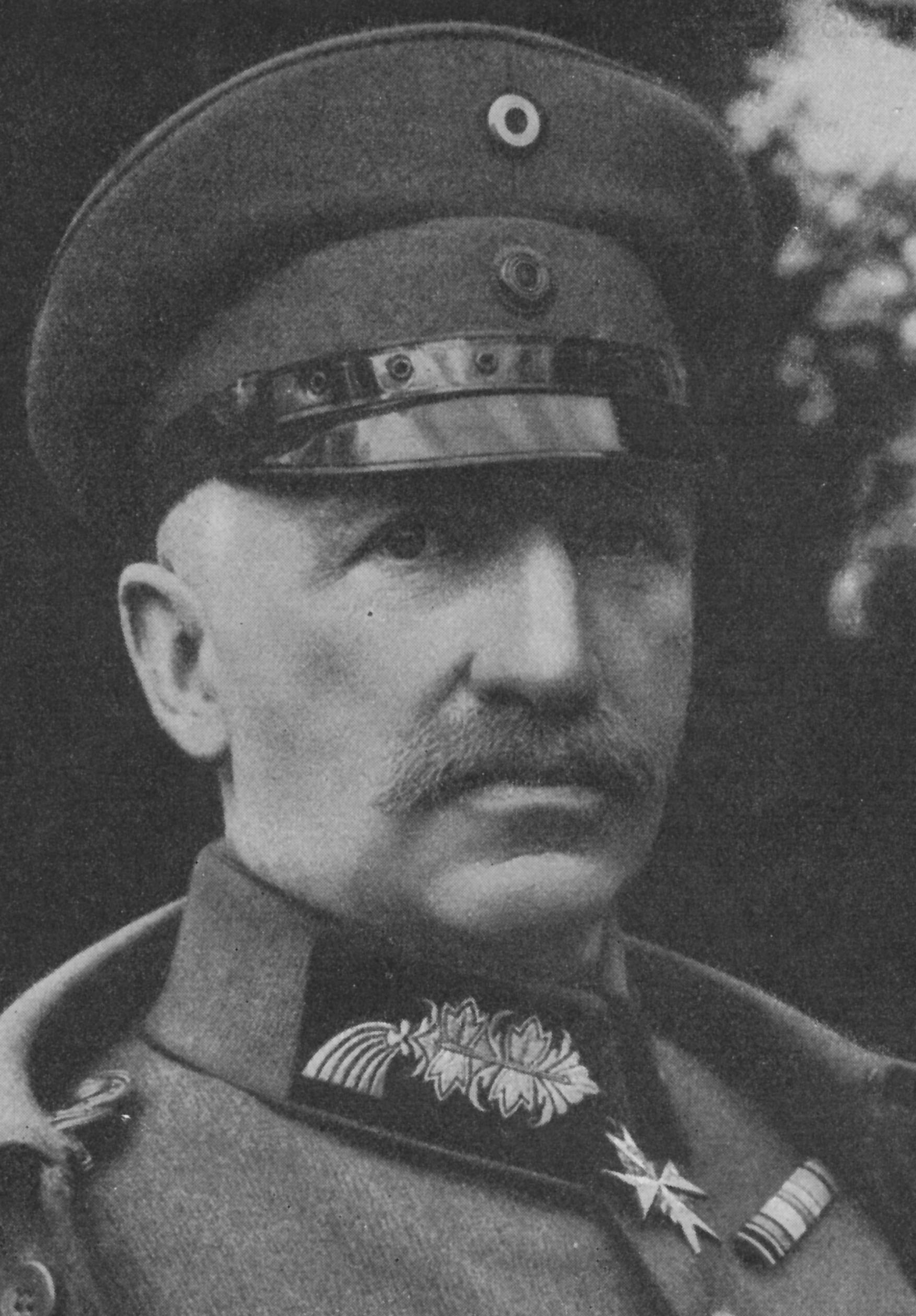
- Born: July 19, 1863; Ulm, Kingdom of Württemberg, German Empire
- Died: 10 April 1947 (aged 83); Stuttgart, Allied-occupied Germany
- Military career
- Allegiance: German Empire; Weimar Republic; Nazi Germany
- Branch: Imperial German Army; Reichswehr; Schutzstaffel
- Service years: 1881–1919
- Rank: Generalmajor char. General der Artillerie; SS-Obergruppenführer
- Commands: 27th Infantry Division
- Conflicts: World War I, World War II
- Awards: Pour le Mérite

Heinrich von Maur, Karl Theodor Alexander Heinrich von Maur (July 19, 1863 – April 10, 1947) was an Imperial German Army general during World War I who became an SS-Obergruppenführer.

== Biography ==
Maur was born in Ulm and, in 1881, joined the 29th (2nd Württemberg) Field Artillery Regiment. On February 5, 1883, he was promoted to a second lieutenant. On March 22, 1913, he was promoted to Oberst and made commander of his main regiment. With the start of World War I, his regiment was deployed on the western front and took part in the battles at Longwy, preparing for the crossings at Meuse and Varennes. Next the regiment transferred to northern France and fought at Lille and Ypres. In December 1914 the unit was transferred to Poland and took part in the battles of Łowicz, Rawka and Bzura.

On December 24, 1914, Maur resigned his command and was appointed commander of the 79th Reserve Field Artillery Brigade, part of the 79th Reserve Division. Next he took part in the Second Battle of the Masurian Lakes. Then he participated in the battles on the Bobr and the fighting at the trenches at Augustow. In summer 1915 he took part in the taking of the Kovno Fortress. Afterwards he fought in the Battle of the Nemen and in October 1915 the Battle of Wilna and then trench warfare at Krewo. On January 27, 1916, Maur was promoted to Generalmajor. On June 5, 1916, Maur returned to the Western Front and took over command of the 26th Reserve Field Artillery Brigade, which he led during the Battle of the Somme. In February 1917, Maur became Artillery Commander No. 122, but on March 12, 1917, was appointed commander of the 27th Infantry Division, which currently served as a training unit at Valenciennes. Then he took part in the Battle of Arras against British and Australian forces. For his service in the Battle of Arras Maur was awarded the order Pour le Mérite on May 20, 1917. Next he took part in the Battle of Passchendaele, then the Meuse–Argonne offensive, where he was at the Armistice of 11 November 1918.

After the war Maur demobilized and dissolved his unit. On October 1, 1919, he was appointed to head the demobilization of the XIII (Royal Württemberg) Corps. On November 3, 1919, he retired with the character of a Generalleutnant.

In 1919 Maur took classes at the Technical University of Stuttgart until 1921 when he transferred to the University of Tübingen. In February 1922 he received his doctorate from Theodor von Pistorius, the Professor of Political Science and Economics, with his work on the purchasing power of money in modern economy.

From 1924 to 1938, Maur served as president of the Württemberg Warriors' Association. On September 13, 1936, Maur joined the Schutzstaffel (membership number 276,907) and was promoted to SS-Obergruppenführer on July 19, 1944. He become a Nazi Party member on May 1, 1937 (membership number 5,890,310). Maur was given the character of a General of the Artillery on August 27, 1939, the so-called Tannenbergtag. When Heinrich Himmler became commander of Heeresgruppe Oberrhein in December 1944 Maur seems to have been the main military adviser to the inexperienced Himmler, notably during Operation Nordwind in early 1945.

Maur died in Stuttgart in April 1947.

== Awards ==
Awards:

- Order of the Crown III
- Württemberg Service Medal 1st Class
- Iron Cross (1914) 2nd and 1st class
- Knight's Cross of the Württemberg Military Order of Merit on November 1, 1914
- Commander of the Order of the Württemberg Crown with swords on August 15, 1916
- Order of the Red Eagle II Class with Swords in October 1916
- Bavarian Military Order of Merit II Class with Swords in March 1917
- Commander 1st class of the Friedrich Order with swords on November 16, 1917

== See also ==
- Register of SS leaders in general's rank
