= Siegfried Seidel-Dittmarsch =

Nazi Party politician and SS-Gruppenführer

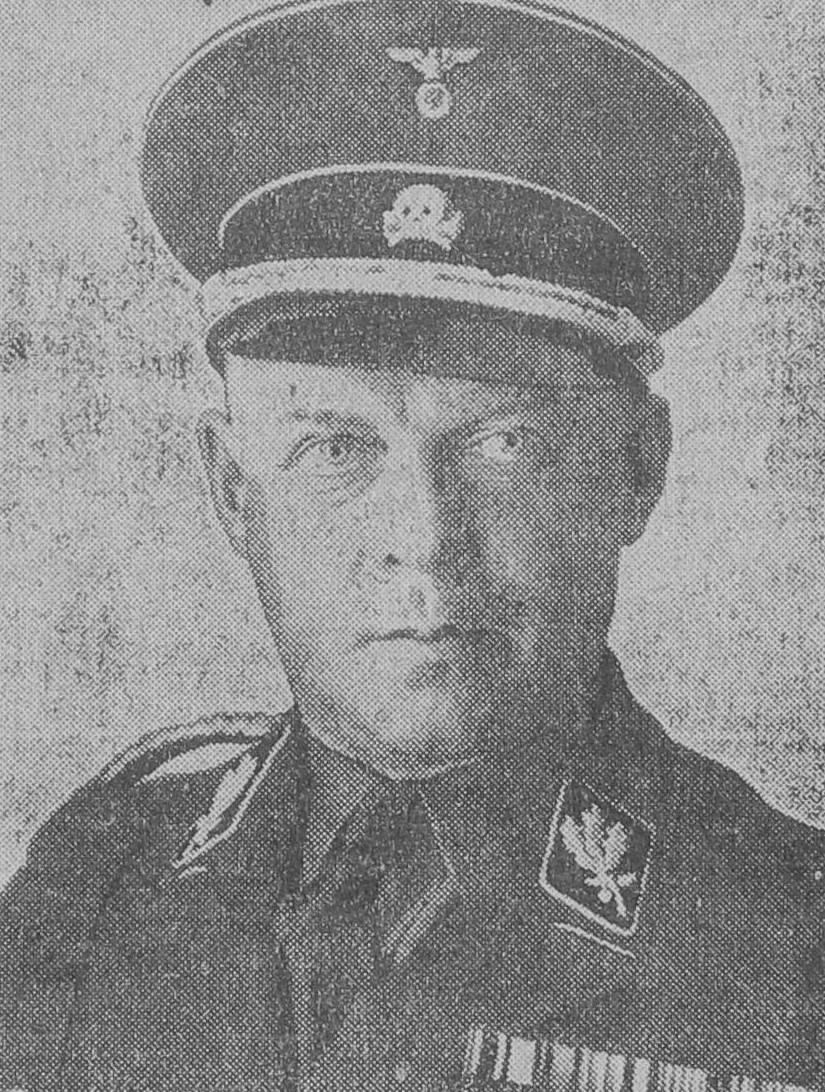

Chief, SS-Amt
- In office 12 June 1933 – 20 February 1934
- Preceded by: Ernst Bach
- Succeeded by: Curt Wittje

Chief, SS-Fuhrungstabs
- In office January 1933 – 20 February 1934
- Succeeded by: Position abolished

Inspector, Supreme SA Leadership
- In office February 1933 – 20 February 1934

Additional positions
- 1932–1934: Member of the Reichstag
- 1933–1934: Member of the Prussian State Council

Personal details
- Born: Siegfried Hermann Martin Theodor Seidel; 4 January 1887 Pammin, Province of Pomerania, Kingdom of Prussia, German Empire
- Died: 20 February 1934 (aged 47) Berlin, Nazi Germany
- Resting place: Stahnsdorf South-Western Cemetery
- Profession: Military officer

Military service
- Allegiance: German Empire; Weimar Republic; Nazi Germany
- Branch/service: Royal Prussian Army; Reichswehr; Schutzstaffel
- Years of service: 1906–1918; 1919–1921; 1931–1934
- Rank: Major; SS-Gruppenführer
- Unit: 48th (5th Brandenburg) Infantry Regiment
- Battles/wars: World War I
- Awards: Iron Cross, 1st and 2nd class Wound Badge

Siegfried Seidel-Dittmarsch (4 January 1887 – 20 February 1934) was a German Nazi Party politician and SS-Gruppenführer. He was a member of the Reichstag and headed the SS central leadership staff that was the precursor of the SS Main Office.

== Early life ==
Seidel-Dittmarsch was born in Pammin (today, Pomień) in Pomerania. He attended Volksschule and the Heinrich-Schliemann-Gymnasium in Berlin. After earning his Abitur, he embarked on a career as a professional military officer in the Royal Prussian Army. In 1906, he was commissioned as a Leutnant in the 48th (5th Brandenburg) Infantry Regiment "von Stülpnagel", headquartered in Küstrin (today, Kostrzyn nad Odrą), and later became the regimental adjutant.

During the First World War, Seidel-Dittmarsch fought at the front, where he was seriously wounded, earning the Iron Cross, 1st and 2nd class and the Wound Badge. He then served in various staff positions in the army high command. After the war, he remained in the military and became an advisor in the Prussian War Ministry and in the Reichswehr Ministry. In 1921, he resigned from the Reichswehr at his own request, with the rank of Major. In the following years, he made his living as a businessman in commercial and industrial companies.

== Nazi Party and SS career ==
Seidel-Dittmarsch joined the Nazi Party in October 1931. In the July 1932 German federal election, he was elected as a deputy to the Reichstag from electoral constituency 4 (Potsdam I). He failed to achieve reelection in the next election on November 6, when the Party experienced a drop-off in support. However, following the Nazi seizure of power, he regained his former seat in the 5 March 1933 election, retaining this seat until his death.

A member of the SS since October 1931 (SS number 18,615), Seidel-Dittmarsch served as the adjutant to Reichsführer-SS Heinrich Himmler and on the staff of SS-Gruppe Ost until the end of 1932. He was next named Chief of the SS Leadership Staff (SS-Fuhrungstabs) that served as a liaison unit to other Party components. On 12 June 1933, he was an SS-Gruppenführer and, upon the death of SS-Oberführer Dr. Ernst Bach, succeeded him as Chief of the SS-Amt, the precursor to the SS Main Office. In addition, he held the office of Inspector at the Obersten SA-Führung (Supreme SA Leadership) from February 1933. On 14 September 1933, Prussian Minister-president Hermann Göring appointed him to the recently reconstituted Prussian State Council.

== Death and burial ==
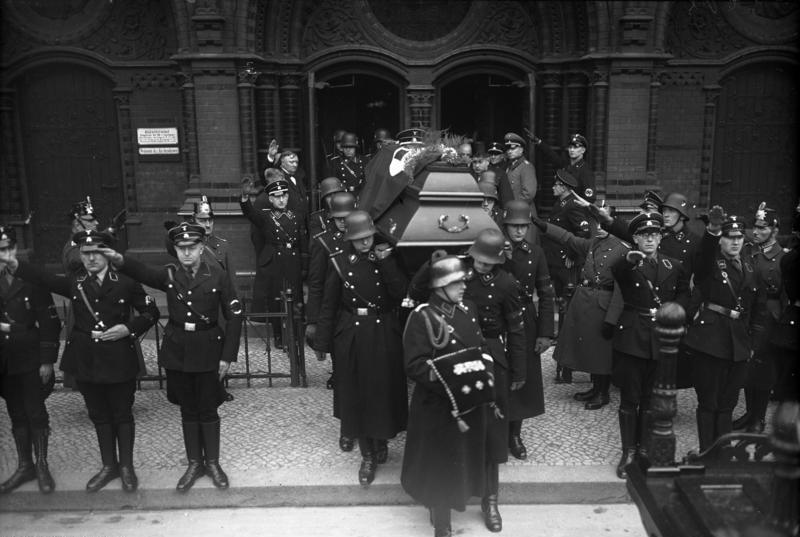
Seidel Dittmarsch's funeral, 23 February 1934

Seidel-Dittmarsch died of natural causes in Berlin on 20 February at the age of 47 and was succeeded as Chief of the SS-Amt by Curt Wittje. He was given a military funeral on 23 February and was buried in the Alter St.-Matthäus-Kirchhof in Schöneberg. As part of Albert Speer's plans for construction of the new Reich capital, to be called Germania, about a third of the cemetery was torn up in 1938–1939. Seidel-Dittmarsch's remains were among those disinterred and moved to the Stahnsdorf South-Western Cemetery about 12 miles southwest of Berlin. In December 1934, the 54th SS-Standarte, headquartered in Landsberg an der Warthe (today, Gorzów Wielkopolski), was granted the honor title "Seidel-Dittmarsch".

== Sources ==
- Information about Siegfried Seidel-Dittmarsch in the Reichstag database
- Lilla, Joachim (2005). Der Preußische Staatsrat 1921–1933: Ein biographisches Handbuch. Düsseldorf: Droste Verlag. ISBN 978-3-770-05271-4.
- Yerger, Mark C. (1997). Allgemeine-SS: The Commands, Units and Leaders of the General SS. Schiffer Publishing Ltd. ISBN 0-7643-0145-4.
