= August Heissmeyer =

German Nazi SS-Obergruppenführer (1897–1979)

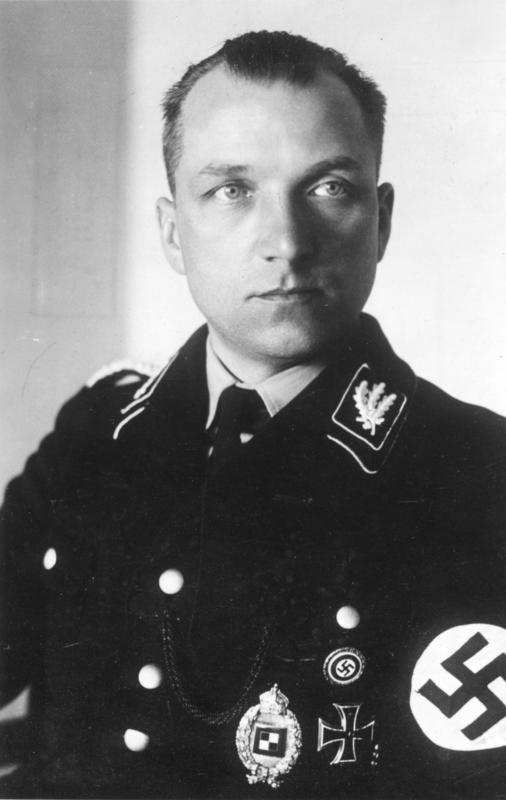

Chief, SS Main Office Dienststelle Obergruppenführer Heissmeyer
- In office 11 January 1941 – 8 May 1945
- Preceded by: Position created
- Succeeded by: Position abolished

Higher SS and Police Leader "Spree"
- In office 2 September 1939 – 8 May 1945
- Preceded by: Position created
- Succeeded by: Position abolished

Chief, SS Main Office
- In office 14 May 1935 – 1 December 1939
- Preceded by: Curt Wittje
- Succeeded by: Gottlob Berger

Additional positions
- 1933–1945: Reichstag deputy

Personal details
- Born: August Friedrich Heißmeyer; 11 January 1897 Aerzen, Province of Hanover, Kingdom of Prussia, German Empire
- Died: 16 January 1979 (aged 82) Schwäbisch Hall, West Germany
- Party: Nazi Party
- Spouse: Gertrud Scholtz-Klink (m. 1940)
- Relations: Kurt Heissmeyer (nephew)
- Civilian awards: Golden Party Badge

Military service
- Allegiance: German Empire; Nazi Germany
- Branch/service: Prussian Army; Luftstreitkräfte; Schutzstaffel; Allgemeine-SS; Waffen-SS
- Years of service: 1914–1919; 1944–1945
- Rank: Leutnant; SS-Obergruppenführer and General of the Waffen-SS
- Unit: 164th Infantry Regiment; Reserve Infantry Regiment 269
- Commands: Kampfgruppe "Heissmeyer"
- Battles/wars: World War I World War II
- Military awards: Iron Cross, 1st and 2nd class War Merit Cross, 1st and 2nd class with swords Wound Badge in black

August Friedrich Heissmeyer or Heißmeyer (11 January 1897 – 16 January 1979), was a German member of the Nazi Party who rose to become an SS-Obergruppenführer in the Schutzstaffel (SS). He held several major commands, including as the chief of the SS Main Office from 1935 to 1939 and as the Higher SS and Police Leader of the Berlin district from 1939 to 1945. He was also headed the National Political Institutes of Education, a network of elite secondary boarding schools established to train future leaders of the Nazi state. He was the husband of Gertrud Scholtz-Klink, the head of the National Socialist Women's League. After the Second World War, Heissmeyer underwent denazification, was convicted as a major offender and served three years in prison.

== Early life ==
Heissmeyer was born in Aerzen, the son of a farmer. His education consisted of four years at the local Volksschule, followed by three years of private tutoring and four years at the Gymnasium in Hamelin. On the outbreak of the First World War, he left school and joined the Royal Prussian Army as a one-year volunteer in August 1914. From October 1914, he served with the 164th Infantry Regiment on the western front, being promoted to Leutnant on 6 August 1916. He served as a Zugführer (platoon commander) and as an orderly officer at the brigade and division levels. He was wounded by shrapnel in April 1917 and, after recovery, he served as a company commander with Reserve Infantry Regiment 269 until August. He then transferred to the Luftstreitkräfte where he underwent pilot training and flew combat missions until the end of the war. For his war service, he was awarded the Iron Cross 1st and 2nd class and the Wound Badge in black.

Heissmeyer joined the Grenzschutz Ost, a border defense force, for a short while and then left military service in February 1919. He worked as a laborer in a wool products factory and then joined the Marine-Brigade von Loewenfeld, a Freikorps unit, between March and August 1920. He took courses to complete his education and earned his Abitur in October 1920. Between 1920 and 1922, he took courses in law and economics at the universities of Göttingen, Kiel and Frankfurt but due to financial difficulties did not complete his degree. From 1920 to 1925, he also was employed as a miner in Castrop-Rauxel, a factory laborer at Farbwerke Höchst and the head of the factory's pest control department. He formed a National Socialist factory cell and was terminated by the owners in April 1925 for his political activity. He had married Marie Lode, a German Red Cross nurse, in August 1923 and by this time had the first of his six children by her. She would die in childbirth in November 1939.

== Nazi Party and SS career ==
On 1 May 1925, Heissmeyer joined the Sturmabteilung (SA), the Nazi paramilitary organization, and became the SA-Führer in Göttingen. He formally was admitted to the Nazi Party on 30 October 1925 (membership number 21,573). As an early Party member, he later would be awarded the Golden Party Badge. He was named the SA-Gauführer of SA-Gausturm Hannover-Süd and was responsible for expanding its membership, which he continued to lead until August 1928. From 1927 to April 1928, he also was the Gauschäftsführer (business manager) for Gau Hannover-Süd under Gauleiter Ludolf Haase and at times served as acting deputy Gauleiter in place of Hermann Fobke. He attempted to return to his studies between 1925 and 1927 with the financial assistance of his father-in-law, but this was withdrawn when the extent of his political involvement was discovered and Heissmeyer again had to cease his studies. Between 1928 and 1931, Heissmeyer continued to work at various jobs, including as a sales representative for a fruit tree company, at the Siemens-Schuckert aircraft engine plant and as an instructor at a driving school.

Heissmeyer joined the Schutzstaffel (SS) on 17 December 1930 (SS number 4,370). Commissioned as an SS-Sturmführer in March 1931, he was rapidly promoted and by November he was in command of SS-Standarte 12 "Niedersachsen" with headquarters in Braunschweig. On 6 October 1932, he became the first Führer of SS-Abschnitt (district) XVII in Münster. On 16 November 1933, he was advanced to become the first Führer of the newly-established SS-Oberabschnitt (main district) "Elbe" in Dresden. This was followed by a posting as Führer of the new SS-Oberabschnitt "Rhein" in Koblenz on 1 January 1934. After this series of field commands, he was transferred to take up a staff position in SS headquarters as chief of the SS Main Office on 14 May 1935, succeeding Curt Wittje and retaining this important central command until 1 December 1939. From November 1935 to January 1936, he also took personal command of Amt I, its Leadership Office. In February 1936, Heissmeyer was also made Inspector of the National Political Institutes of Education (Napolas), a network of elite secondary boarding schools to train future leaders of the Nazi state. He held this post until the end of the war, by which time he was overseeing 43 leadership schools. On 9 November 1936, Heissmeyer was promoted to SS-Obergruppenführer and in April 1938, he was named chairman of the Reichsbund der Kinderreichen, an organization that promoted large Aryan families.

In addition to his SS positions, Heissmeyer also held political offices. In the March 1933 parliamentary election, he was elected as a deputy to the Reichstag from electoral constituency 17 (Westphalia North). He would retain this seat until the fall of the Nazi regime. On 30 January 1935, he was appointed as a Prussian provincial councilor for the Rhine Province.

=== Second World War ===
Immediately following the outbreak of the Second World War, Heissmeyer was appointed as the Higher SS and Police Leader (HSSPF) "Spree" on 2 September 1939, where he was in charge of all SS and police in the Berlin-Brandenburg area. He would be the only holder of this post, retaining it until the end of the war. After Theodor Eicke left his post as head of the Concentration Camps Inspectorate to take command of the SS Division Totenkopf, his deputy Richard Glücks succeeded him as inspector on 15 November 1939 and ran the day-to-day operations of this unit. He technically worked under the supervision of Heissmeyer who, until 15 August 1940, held the title of Inspector of Concentration Camps and General Inspector of the SS-Totenkopfverbände. In August 1940, Heissmeyer was made a Ministerialdirektor in the Reich Ministry of Science, Education and Culture. In addition, on 11 January 1941, he was made chief of the new eponymous SS main office "Dienststelle Obergruppenführer Heissmeyer" to tighten SS control over the Napolas and their mission in National Socialist education. In August of that year, he was also appointed Inspector of German Home Schools.

In December 1940, Heissmeyer, a widower with six children, married Gertrud Scholtz-Klink, the Reichsfrauenführerin (Reich Women's Leader) of the National Socialist Women's League, who had two previous marriages and was a mother of four. They had one son together, born in 1944. During the Battle of Berlin in April 1945, Heissmeyer formed and led the Kampfgruppe (battle group) "Heissmeyer", a combination of his SS command, Volkssturm militia and Hitler Youth who were charged with protecting the Spandau airfield outside Berlin. On the night of 25 April, the defenders were decimated by a Red Army assault and the survivors fled west over the Havel river via the Charlotten Bridge. During the war, Heissmeyer was awarded the War Merit Cross, 1st and 2nd class with swords.

== Post-war life and prosecutions ==
Heissmeyer and Scholtz-Klink fled from Berlin before its capitulation. They destroyed their identity papers and uniforms, and after Germany's surrender, they briefly were interned in a Soviet prisoner of war camp near Magdeburg in the summer of 1945. They managed to convince their captors that they were refugees from the east and were released in September. With the assistance of Princess Pauline of Württemberg, Heissmeyer and Scholtz-Klink went into hiding in Bebenhausen near Tübingen where they worked as domestic servants. They spent the subsequent three years under the aliases of Heinrich and Maria Stuckenbrock (his mother's maiden name). On 28 February 1948, the couple were identified and arrested by French occupation authorities. Put on trial for possession of false identity papers, they were convicted in April 1948 and sentenced to 18 months in prison in Rottenburg am Neckar before being released in August 1949. Returning to Tübingen, they underwent denazification proceedings there and were classified as Category I (major offenders) on 21 June 1950. Heissmeyer was sentenced to three years imprisonment and the forfeiture of property. Scholtz-Klink received a sentence of 30 months in a labor camp. After his release, Heissmeyer lived in Schwäbisch Hall and became the director of a West German Coca-Cola bottling plant. He died on 16 January 1979.

Heissmeyer was an uncle to Kurt Heissmeyer, a Nazi physician who conducted human experimentation on Jewish children at the Neuengamme concentration camp. He was arrested in 1963, convicted of crimes against humanity and sentenced to life imprisonment in 1966.

== SS and police ranks ==
SS and police ranks
| Date | Rank |
|---|---|
| 5 January 1931 | SS-Truppführer |
| 31 March 1931 | SS-Sturmführer |
| 25 August 1931 | SS-Sturmbannführer |
| 18 March 1932 | SS-Standartenführer |
| 6 October 1932 | SS-Oberführer |
| 9 November 1933 | SS-Brigadeführer |
| 28 February 1934 | SS-Gruppenführer |
| 9 November 1936 | SS-Obergruppenführer |
| 1 July 1944 | General der Polizei und General der Waffen-SS |

== Sources ==
- Information about August Heissmeyer in the Reichstag database
- Klee, Ernst (2007). Das Personenlexikon zum Dritten Reich. Wer war was vor und nach 1945. Fischer-Taschenbuch-Verlag. Frankfurt-am-Main. p. 241. ISBN 978-3-596-16048-8.
- Miller, Michael D. (2006). Leaders of the SS & German Police. Vol. 1 Reichsführer SS – Gruppenführer (Georg Ahrens to Karl Gutenberger). R. James Bender Publishing. ISBN 978-9-329-70037-2.
- Miller, Michael D.; Schulz, Andreas (2015). Leaders of the SS & German Police. Vol. 2 Reichsführer SS – Gruppenführer (Hans Haltermann to Walter Kruger). R. James Bender Publishing. ISBN 978-1-932-97025-8.
- Stockhorst, Erich (1985). 5000 Köpfe: Wer War Was im 3. Reich. Arndt. p. 186. ISBN 978-3-887-41116-9.
- Williams, Max (2015). SS Elite: The Senior Leaders of Hitler's Praetorian Guard. Vol. 1. Fonthill Media LLC. ISBN 978-1-781-55433-3.
- Yerger, Mark C. (1997). The Allgemeine-SS: The Commands, Units and Leaders of the General SS. Schiffer Publishing Ltd. ISBN 0-7643-0145-4.
