= SS Main Office =

SS central command office in Nazi Germany (until 1940)

- SS-Hauptamt (SS-HA)
- Vehicle command flag for SS Main Office

- SS logo

Agency overview
- Formed: 30 January 1935
- Dissolved: 8 May 1945
- Jurisdiction: Germany; Occupied Europe
- Headquarters: Prinz-Albrecht-Straße, Berlin
- Minister responsible: Heinrich Himmler
- Agency executive: Gottlob Berger
- Parent agency: SS
- Child agencies: Allgemeine SS; SS-Verfügungstruppe; SS-Totenkopfverbände

The SS Main Office (German: SS-Hauptamt; SS-HA) was the central command office of the Schutzstaffel (SS) in Nazi Germany until 1940.

== Formation ==
The office traces its origins to 1931 when the SS created the SS-Amt to serve as an SS Headquarters staff overseeing the various units of the Allgemeine SS (General SS). In 1933, after the Nazi Party came to power, the SS-Amt was renamed the SS-Oberführerbereichen and placed in command of all SS units within Nazi Germany. Its leaders were Ernst Bach (December 1932 to June 1933), Siegfried Seidel-Dittmarsch (June 1933 to February 1934) and Curt Wittje (from February 1934). This agency then became the SS-HA on January 30, 1935. The organization oversaw the Allgemeine SS, concentration camps, the SS-Verfügungstruppe (Special-purpose troops), and the Grenzschutz (Border Control regiments).

During the late 1930s, the power of the SS-HA continued to grow becoming the largest and most powerful office of the SS, managing nearly all aspects of the paramilitary organisation. This included the SS officer schools (SS-Junker Schools), physical training, communication, SS garrisons, logistics and support. Shortly after the outbreak of World War II in Europe, the SS-Verfügungstruppe expanded rapidly becoming the Waffen-SS in 1940. By this time, the office of the SS-Hauptamt could no longer administer the entire SS organisation and had to relinquish much of its responsibilities. As a result, the SS-HA was downsized losing much of its pre-war power to the SS Führungshauptamt (SS Leadership Main Office; SS-FHA) and the main offices of the Allgemeine SS, such as the Reich Security Main Office.

Recruiting members for the Waffen-SS was handled through the SS-HA and its chief, Gottlob Berger. This caused overlapping jurisdiction and friction with the SS-FHA. Berger's SS-HA had a problematic relationship with the SS-FHA, which was responsible for organising, training and equipping the Waffen-SS. The SS-FHA wanted the Waffen-SS to be a small elite corps, but Berger and Himmler knew that Adolf Hitler needed as many divisions as possible, even if that meant some Waffen-SS formations would be of lesser quality. During the early war years, to meet the high casualty rates and expansion of Waffen-SS field divisions, members of the Allgemeine SS were used for compulsory recruitment drives by the SS-HA for both the Waffen-SS and the SS-Totenkopfverbände. The General SS members were especially seen as well suited for duty at the Nazi concentration camps and extermination camps. From 1942, forward, other personnel working for SS organisations were also drafted into the Waffen-SS to meet its manpower needs.

== Organisation ==
In 1940 the SS-Hauptamt remained responsible for SS administrative matters such as manpower allocation, supplies, personnel transfers, and promotions. The SS-HA had 11 departments (Ämter or Amtsgruppen):

- Amt Zentralamt (Central office)
- Amt Leitender Arzt beim Chef SS-HA (Chief Medical Officer)
- Amt Verwaltung (Administration)
- Amt Ergänzungsamt der Waffen-SS (Waffen-SS Reinforcements)
- Amt Erfassungsamt (Requisitioning)
- Amt für Weltanschauliche Erziehung (Ideological Training)
- Amt für Leibeserziehhung (Physical Training)
- Amt für Berufserziehung (Trade Training)
- Amt Germanische Leitstelle (Germanic Control)
- Amt Germanische Ergänzung (Germanic Recruitment)
- Amt Germanische Erziehung (Germanic Education)

The SS-HA was technically subordinate to the Personal Staff Reichsführer-SS, but in reality it remained autonomous.

== Leadership ==
| No. | Portrait | Name | Took office | Left office | Time in office | Party | Ref. |
|---|---|---|---|---|---|---|---|
| 1 | Curt Wittje | SS-Gruppenführer; Curt Wittje (1894–1947) | 12 February 1934 | 14 May 1935 | 1 year, 91 days | NSDAP | |
| 2 | August Heissmeyer | SS-Obergruppenführer; August Heissmeyer (1897–1979) | 14 May 1935 | 9 November 1939 | 4 years, 179 days | NSDAP | |
| 3 | Gottlob Berger | SS-Obergruppenführer; Gottlob Berger (1896–1975) | 1 December 1939 | 8 May 1945 | 5 years, 180 days | NSDAP | |

== Post-war ==
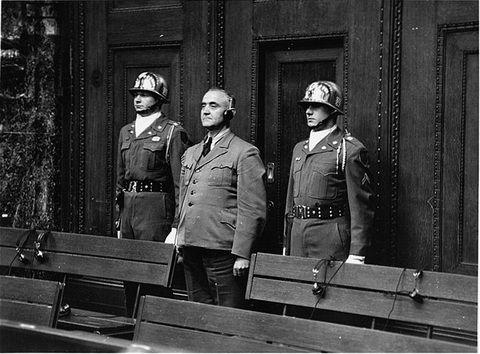
Gottlob Berger in the dock at the Ministries Trial, part of the subsequent Nuremberg trials, in 1949.

After the end of World War II in Europe, members of the SS-HA were charged with war crimes and crimes against humanity. Former chief Gottlob Berger was arrested in May 1945 and tried at the Ministries Trial. The trial against Berger and his co-defendants commenced on 6 January 1948, and ended on 13 April 1949. Berger was sentenced to 25 years imprisonment, but received credit for the four years during which he had been in custody awaiting trial. Berger was released from Landsberg Prison in 1951.
