= Allgemeine-SS regional commands =

See "Waffen-SS divisions" for the Waffen-SS order of battle

The Allgemeine-SS regional commands were titled SS-Oberabschnitte (SS Main Districts) and first were established on November 16, 1933. They replaced the earlier command structure composed of five SS-Gruppen and comprised the regional component of the Allgemeine-SS command structure. They reported to the SS-Amt (SS Office), in 1935 renamed the SS-Hauptamt (SS Main Office). Their commanders carried the title of SS-Oberabschnitte Führer and usually held the rank of SS-Gruppenführer or SS-Obergruppenführer. Beginning in November 1937, when the Higher SS and Police Leaders were established, the SS-Oberabschnitte were subordinated to them. However, in nearly every instance, the SS-Oberabschnitt Führer held both positions simultaneously. The Oberabschnitt Führer's staff was headed by a Stabschef (Chief of Staff) who oversaw departments encompassing administration, training, personnel, medical affairs, as well as specialty units such as signals and engineer battalions.

SS-Oberabschnitte in 1944 are displayed in the third inset of the top row, right.

These regional commands originally existed only in Germany and Austria and generally conformed to the existing Wehrkreis (Military Districts) of the Wehrmacht. During the Second World War, additional Oberabschnitte were established for six conquered areas (Baltic States & Byelorussia, Bohemia and Moravia, Netherlands, Norway, Poland and Ukraine). Other occupied territories, however, did not have Oberabschnitte established, and SS personnel there were directly under the jurisdiction of the Higher SS and Police Leader for that area. By 1944, there were a total of 23 active Oberabschnitte.

== Oberabschnitte Commands ==
The following table lists, by date of formation, the existing Oberabschnitte commands that were established from November 1933 through April 1944.

Final Designation	Headquarters	Years of Operation	Last permanent commander	Notes
Elbe	Dresden	November 16, 1933 – May 8, 1945	SS-Gruppenführer; Ludolf von Alvensleben	Part of former SS-Gruppen Ost and Südost; Renamed Mitte June 1934 – April 1936. Wehrkreis IV
Mitte	Braunschweig	November 16, 1933 – May 8, 1945	SS-Obergruppenführer; Rudolf Querner	Part of former SS-Gruppe Nord. Formed as Oberabschnitt Nordwest. Renamed Mitte April 1, 1936. Wehrkreis XI
Nord	Hamburg	November 16, 1933 – April 1, 1936	SS-Obergruppenführer Werner Lorenz	Part of former SS-Gruppe Nord. Divided into SS-Oberabschnitte Nord (later Ostsee) and Nordwest (later Nordsee). Wehrkreise II & X.
Spree	Berlin	November 16, 1933 – May 8, 1945	SS-Obergruppenführer; Sepp Dietrich (Note: From November 1939, SS-Gruppenführer Max Schneller substituted for Dietrich who continued to hold titular command.)	Part of former SS-Gruppe Ost. Formed as Oberabschnitt Ost. Renamed Spree November 14,1939. Wehrkreis III
Süd	Munich	November 16, 1933 – April 20, 1945	SS-Obergruppenführer; Karl von Eberstein	Part of former SS-Gruppe Süd. Wehrkreis VII
Südost	Brieg; Breslau	November 16, 1933 – May 8, 1945	SS-Obergruppenführer; Richard Hildebrandt	Former SS-Gruppe Südost. Wehrkreis VIII
Südwest	Stuttgart	November 16, 1933 – May 8, 1945	SS-Gruppenführer; Otto Hofmann	Part of former SS-Gruppe Süd. Wehrkreis V
West	Düsseldorf	November 16, 1933 – May 8, 1945	SS-Gruppenführer; Karl Gutenberger	Part of former SS-Gruppe West. Wehrkreis VI
Nordost	Königsberg	December 15, 1933 – May 8, 1945	SS-Obergruppenführer; Hans-Adolf Prützmann (Note: From December 1944, SS-Gruppenführer Otto Hellwig substituted for Prützmann who continued to hold titular command.)	Part of former SS-Gruppe Ost. Formed from a portion of Oberabschnitt Nord. Wehrkreis I
Rhein	Koblenz	January 1, 1934 – September 11, 1943	SS-Gruppenführer; Theodor Berkelmann	Part of former SS-Gruppe West. Formed from a portion of Oberabschnitt West. Merged with Westmark in September 1943 to form Oberabschnitt Rhein-Westmark. Wehrkreis XII
Donau	Vienna	February 15, 1934 – May 8, 1945	SS-Gruppenführer; Walter Schimana	Formed as Oberabschnitt Österreich. Renamed Donau May 1938. Wehrkreis XVII
Main	Nuremberg	April 1, 1936 – May 8, 1945	SS-Obergruppenführer; Benno Martin	Formed from a portion of Oberabschnitt Süd. Wehrkreis XIII
Nordsee	Altona	April 1, 1936 – May 8, 1945	SS-Gruppenführer; Georg-Henning Graf von Bassewitz-Behr	Formed from division of the first Oberabschnitt Nord and named Nordwest. Renamed Nordsee April 20, 1940. Wehrkreis X
Ostsee	Stettin	April 1, 1936 – May 8, 1945	SS-Gruppenführer; Emil Mazuw	Formed from division of the first Oberabschnitt Nord and also named Nord. Renamed Ostsee February 1, 1940. Wehrkreis II
Fulda-Werra	Arolsen	January 1, 1937 – May 8, 1945	SS-Obergruppenführer; Josias Erbprinz zu Waldeck-Pyrmont	Formed from portions of Oberabschnitte Rhein & Elbe. Wehrkreis IX
Alpenland	Salzburg	June 1, 1939 – May 8, 1945	SS-Obergruppenführer; Erwin Rösener (Note: From November 1944, SS-Brigadeführer Hermann Harm substituted for Rösener who continued to hold titular command.)	Formed from a portion of Oberabschnitt Donau. Wehrkreis XVIII
Warthe	Posen	October 26, 1939 – May 8, 1945	SS-Gruppenführer; Willy Schmelcher	Oberabschnitt in Wartheland. Wehrkreis XXI
Weichsel	Danzig	November 9, 1939 – May 8, 1945	SS-Gruppenführer; Fritz Katzmann	Oberabschnitt in Danzig-West Prussia. Wehrkreis XX
Nord	Oslo	April 20, 1940 – May 8, 1945	SS-Gruppenführer; Wilhelm Rediess	Oberabschnitt in Reichskommissariat Norwegen. Third Oberabschittt named Nord.
Nordwest	The Hague	May 23, 1940 – May 8, 1945	SS-Obergruppenführer; Hanns Albin Rauter	Oberabschnitt in Reichskommissariat Niederlande.
Westmark	Saarbrücken; Neustadt; Metz	August 1, 1940 – September 11, 1943	SS-Gruppenführer; Theodor Berkelmann	Formed as Oberabschnitt Lothringen-Saarpfalz. Renamed Westmark October 15, 1941. Merged with Rhein in September 1943 to form Oberabschnitt Rhein-Westmark. Wehrkreis XII
Ostland	Riga	December 1, 1941 – March 3, 1945	SS-Obergruppenführer; Friedrich Jeckeln	Oberabschnitt in Reichskommissariat Ostland.
Ukraina	Kiev	December 1, 1941 – April 20, 1944	SS-Obergruppenführer; Hans-Adolf Prützmann	Oberabschnitt in Reichskommissariat Ukraine.
Ost	Krakau	September 15, 1942 – May 8, 1945	SS-Obergruppenführer; Wilhelm Koppe	Oberabschnitt in the General Government.
Rhein-Westmark	Wiesbaden	September 11, 1943 – March 24, 1945	SS-Gruppenführer; Jürgen Stroop	Formed by merger of Oberabschnitte Rhein and Westmark. Wehrkreis XII
Böhmen-Mähren	Prague	April 1, 1944 – May 8, 1945	SS-Obergruppenführer; Karl Hermann Frank (Note: From February 1945, SS-Oberführer Emanuel Sladek substituted for Frank who continued to hold titular command.)	Oberabschnitt in the Protectorate of Bohemia and Moravia.

== Sources ==
- McNab, Chris (2009). The SS: 1923–1945. London: Amber Books. ISBN 978-1-90662-649-5.
- Yerger, Mark C. (1997). Allgemeine-SS: The Commands, Units and Leaders of the General SS. Schiffer Publishing Ltd. ISBN 0-7643-0145-4.
