= Fritz Weitzel =

German Nazi police official and SS general (1904–1940)

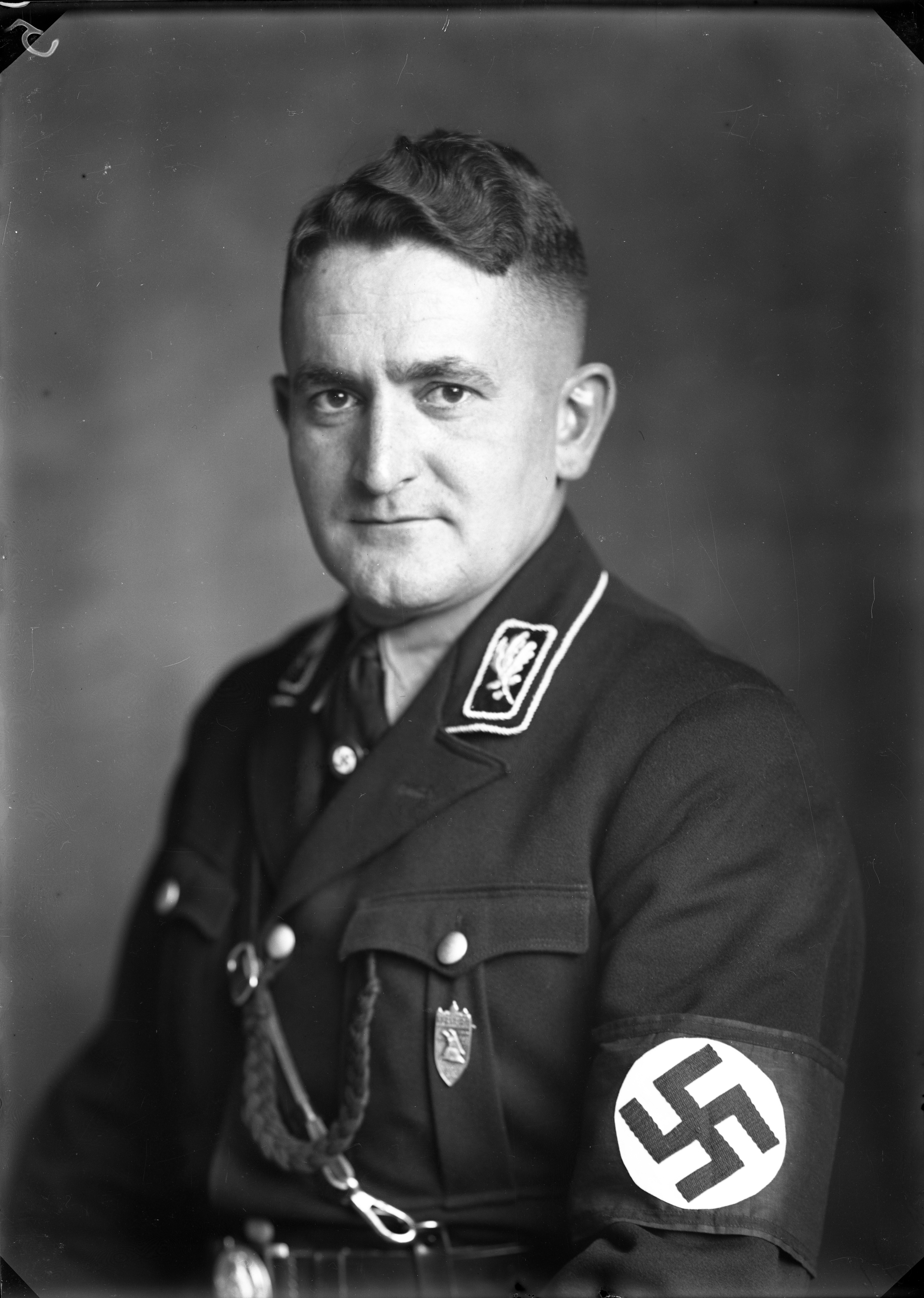
- Weitzel, c. 1934

Police President of Düsseldorf
- In office 12 March 1933 – 19 June 1940
- Preceded by: Hans Langels
- Succeeded by: August Korreng

Higher SS and Police Leader (HSSPF) "Nord"
- In office 20 April 1940 – 19 June 1940
- Preceded by: Position created
- Succeeded by: Wilhelm Rediess

Higher SS and Police Leader (HSSPF) "West"
- In office 11 June 1938 – 20 April 1940
- Preceded by: Position created
- Succeeded by: Theodor Berkelmann

Additional positions
- 1933–1940: Prussian State Councilor
- 1933–1940: Reichstag Deputy
- 1930–1933: Reichstag Deputy

Personal details
- Born: 27 April 1904 Frankfurt, Province of Hesse-Nassau, Kingdom of Prussia, German Empire
- Died: 19 June 1940 (aged 36) Düsseldorf, Rhine Province, Nazi Germany
- Party: Nazi Party (NSDAP)
- Occupation: Locksmith

Military service
- Allegiance: Nazi Germany
- Branch/service: Schutzstaffel
- Years of service: 1926–1940
- Rank: SS-Obergruppenführer
- Battles/wars: World War II

Friedrich "Fritz" Philip Weitzel (27 April 1904 – 19 June 1940) was a German SS-Obergruppenführer and Nazi Party politician during the Nazi era. He was killed in an air raid early in the Second World War.

== Early life and rise in the SS ==
Weitzel was born in Frankfurt and attended Volksschule there. After a locksmithing apprenticeship, he worked in that trade and as a machinist. In 1924, he became a member of the Sturmabteilung (SA) and, in September 1925, he joined the Nazi Party (membership number 18,833). As an early Party member, he would later be awarded the Golden Party Badge. In 1926, Weitzel became one of the earliest members of the Schutzstaffel (SS) (SS number 408). He helped form and lead the SS unit in Frankfurt and in 1927 he was in charge of the SS in Gau Hesse-Nassau Süd. Over the next two years, he led the SS units in Gau Rheinland-Süd, Gau Rheinpfalz and Gau Hesse-Nassau Nord. On 1 May 1928, he became the commander of SS-Standarte 2, based in Frankfurt. On 18 November 1929, he was selected to head what would become SS-Oberabschnitt (Main District) "West", a senior command comprising all of Wehrkreis (Military District) VI, which he would hold until 20 April 1940. Throughout these years, he was arrested and fined multiple times for street violence, breach of the peace, resisting arrest and carrying illegal firearms.

In the 1930 German federal election, Weitzel was elected to the Reichstag as a Nazi Party deputy from electoral constituency 19 (Hesse-Nassau). He would be reelected from there several times until the election of March 1936 when he switched to constituency 22 (Düsseldorf East), the seat he held until his death. On 12 May 1932, Weitzel was involved in a physical attack on the journalist Helmuth Klotz in the Reichstag restaurant. Weitzel, together with three other Nazi deputies, was barred from parliament for 30 days. However, the session had to be adjourned when they refused to leave the Reichstag chamber. On 14 May Weitzel, along with deputies Edmund Heines and Wilhelm Stegmann, was sentenced by a Berlin court to three months in prison for assault.

== Career in Nazi Germany ==
After the Nazi seizure of power, Weitzel was appointed Police President of Düsseldorf on 1 May 1933 by Prussian Minister of the Interior Hermann Göring. Without any formal police training, but as a convinced National Socialist, he was selected to replace the democratic police chief Hans Langels. In July 1933, Göring also appointed Weitzel to the Prussian State Council. Under Weitzel, there were extremely brutal attacks by the police, SS and SA against their political opponents in the city. Numerous Communists and Social Democrats were arrested and beaten, and Weitzel was reported to have personally taken part in interrogations and torture. Weitzel also took a clear stance against Catholicism. As chief of police, he banned processions and public appearances by church groups in the city and published a pamphlet against Catholic priests and religious orders.

On 9 September 1934, Weitzel was promoted to SS-Obergruppenführer. On 30 March 1935, he was made a Provincial Councilor for the Rhine Province. He was also made head of the SS and police court in Düsseldorf. On 11 June 1938, he was appointed by Reichsführer-SS Heinrich Himmler as Higher SS and Police Leader (HSSPF) "West", based in Düsseldorf. As such, he commanded all SS, SD, SiPo and uniformed police in Wehrkreis VI. During the Second World War, after the occupation of Norway by German troops, Weitzel was transferred to become HSSPF "Nord" on 20 April 1940, with headquarters in Oslo. Only two months later, Weitzel was fatally injured by shrapnel in an RAF air raid on Düsseldorf while he was home on leave.

At the time of his death, Weitzel was the fourth most senior officer in the SS. He was given a lavish state funeral in Düsseldorf, in which the Chief of the Ordnungspolizei, SS-Obergruppenfuhrer Kurt Daluege, the Rhenish Oberpresident and Reichskommissar for Norway Josef Terboven and Düsseldorf Gauleiter Friedrich Karl Florian all took part. Just two days after Weitzel's death, the SS-Standarte 20 (Düsseldorf) received the honorary name SS-Standarte Fritz Weitzel.

== SS ranks ==
SS Ranks
Date	Rank
18 November 1929	SS-Standartenführer
20 July 1930	SS-Oberführer
18 December 1931	SS-Gruppenführer
9 September 1934	SS-Obergruppenführer

== See also ==
- List SS-Obergruppenführer

== Sources ==
- Birn, Ruth Bettina: The Higher SS and Police Leaders. Himmler's representative in the Reich and in the occupied territories. Droste Verlag, Düsseldorf, 1986.
- Fleermann, Bastian/Frank Sparing/Astrid Wolters: From the place of terror to the memorial. On the history of the Düsseldorf town hall, in: Memorial Site Circular, ed. by Thomas Lutz on behalf of the Topography of Terror Foundation, Volume 155 (2010), pp. 18–25.
- Fleermann, Bastian: "...follow up to destruction". Wave of arrests and violence against political opponents in the spring of 1933 in Düsseldorf, in: Rhein-Maas. Studies in history, language and culture. Edited by Jörg Engelbrecht, Simone Frank, Christian Krumm and Holger Schmenk, 1/2010, pp. 167–198.
- Köhler, Thomas: Himmler's extended arm in Rhineland and Westphalia. The Higher SS and Police Leaders West, in: Dams, Carsten/Dönecke, Klaus/Köhler, Thomas (eds.): "Service to the people"? Düsseldorf police officers between democracy and dictatorship, Frankfurt am Main 2007, pp. 203–234.
- Lilla, Joachim: The State Police Administration in Düsseldorf 1926-1945, in: Düsseldorfer Jahrbuch 73 (2002), pp. 217–294.
- Lilla, Joachim (2005). Der Preußische Staatsrat 1921–1933: Ein biographisches Handbuch. Düsseldorf: Droste Verlag. ISBN 978-3-770-05271-4.
- Williams, Max (2018). SS Elite: The Senior Leaders of Hitler's Praetorian Guard. Vol. 3. Fonthill Media LLC. ISBN 978-1-781-55638-2.
- Yerger, Mark C. (1997). Allgemeine-SS: The Commands, Units and Leaders of the General SS. Schiffer Publishing Ltd. ISBN 0-7643-0145-4.
