= Günther Merk =

SS-Brigadeführer and Generalmajor of police

- Born: 14 March 1888; Münsterberg (today, Ziębice), Province of Silesia, Kingdom of Prussia, German Empire
- Died: 16 January 1947 (age 58); Kharkov, Ukrainian SSR, Soviet Union
- Cause of death: Execution by firing squad
- Military career
- Allegiance: German Empire; Weimar Republic; Nazi Germany
- Branch: Imperial German Army; Reichswehr; Schutzstaffel; Waffen-SS
- Service years: 1914–1920; 1939–1945
- Rank: Hauptmann; SS-Brigadeführer and Generalmajor of police
- Commands: SS and Police Leader, "Charkow"; Ordnungspolizei Commander, "Krakau"; Commander, 6th SS Police Regiment
- Conflicts: World War I World War II
- Awards: Iron Cross, 1st and 2nd class Clasp to the Iron Cross, 1st and 2nd class Wound Badge, in black

Günther Friedrich Wilhelm Merk (14 March 1888 – 16 January 1947) was a German lawyer and SS-Brigadeführer and Generalmajor of police. During the Second World War he served as the SS and Police Leader in the Charkow region (today, Kharkiv Oblast) and in a military capacity with the Waffen-SS. After the end of the war, he was executed in the Soviet Union for war crimes.

== Early life and career ==
Merk was born in Münsterberg (today, Ziębice) in Lower Silesia. After leaving school in 1908, Merk joined the Imperial German Army and embarked on a military career. He took part in First World War as an artillery officer and earned the Iron Cross, 1st and 2nd class, and the Wound Badge in black. After the end of the war, he served in the Freikorps and was discharged from the army in 1920 with the rank of Hauptmann. He then joined the Schutzpolizei (Protection Police) of the Weimar Republic in mid-July 1921. He also studied law at the University of Berlin, was promoted to Major of police on 7 April 1924 and received his doctorate of law degree in 1926. From 1926 to 1930 he was a instructor at the police academy in Münster. He served in various administrative and command posts in Wuppertal, Berlin, Frankfurt am Main and, from 1938, in Dortmund as chief of police with the rank of Oberst of police.

Since 1932 a member of the Nazi Party (membership number 1,346,722), Merk on 1 November 1939 joined the Allgemeine SS with the rank of SS-Standartenführer (SS number 347,133), and also the Waffen-SS as a Standartenführer of reserves. From that time to December 1940, he served on the staff of SS-Abschnitt (District) XXV, headquartered in Dortmund. He next was transferred to SS headquarters in Berlin where he worked in the SS Personnel Main Office.

== Second World War ==
Promoted to SS-Oberführer on 20 April 1941, Merk saw service with the Waffen-SS, being assigned as commander of a reserve artillery regiment until August 1941. Then, until January 1942, he commanded the artillery regiment of the 2nd SS Panzer Division Das Reich on the eastern front. As part of Army Group Center, his unit participated in Operation Typhoon, the failed attempt to capture Moscow. While serving on active duty with this division, he was awarded the Clasp to the Iron Cross in both classes.

From January 1942 to September 1943 Merk was attached to the main office of the Ordnungspolizei (Order Police), serving from 15 September 1942 to 5 January 1943 as the commander of the 6th SS Police Regiment, carrying out security operations against partisans in southern Russia. Promoted on 1 August 1943 to SS-Brigadeführer and Generalmajor of police, on 11 September he succeeded SS-Gruppenführer Hans Haltermann as the last SS and Police Leader (SSPF) of the Charkow region (today, Kharkiv Oblast), which was already being overrun by the Red Army. He was charged with managing the orderly westward withdrawal of police and security forces, after which his command was disbanded. He was then attached as a special duties officer to the staff of the Higher SS and Police Leader (HSSPF) "Ost" (East), SS-Obergruppenführer Friedrich-Wilhelm Krüger, based in Krakau (today, Kraków). From 18 October 1943 to April 1944 he was the Ordnungspolizei commander in Krakau. He briefly left police service at that point but, due to the deteriorating military and manpower situation, was recalled to service. From August 1944 he was Inspector for defensive position construction in Krakau, and again commander of the Ordnungspolizei from December 1944 to the city's liberation by the Red Army on 18 January 1945.

== Postwar capture and execution ==
On 20 February 1945, Merk fell into Soviet hands as a prisoner of war and was held in Butyrka prison in Moscow. Tried by a Soviet military tribunal in Kharkov (today, Kharkiv) for war crimes, he was sentenced to death by firing squad on 12 November 1946. Specifically, it was charged that while SSPF, units under his command in the Kharkov region were involved in shooting and hanging more than 200 Soviet citizens, including about 100 Soviet soldiers, as well as burning down over 1,000 buildings and abducting about 5,000 youths to Germany for forced labor. After the Presidium of the Supreme Soviet rejected his plea for clemency on 7 January 1947, Merk was executed on 16 January.

== Sources ==
- Müller, Klaus-Dieter; Schaarschmidt, Thomas; Schmeitzner, Mike; Weigelt, Andreas (2015). Todesurteile Sowjetischer Militärtribunale Gegen Deutsche (1944-1947): Eine Historisch-biographische Studie. Göttingen: Vandenhoeck & Ruprecht. ISBN 978-3-525-36968-5.
- Schiffer Publishing Ltd., ed. (2000). SS Officers List: SS-Standartenführer to SS-Oberstgruppenführer (As of 30 January 1942). Schiffer Military History Publishing. ISBN 0-7643-1061-5.
- Schulz, Andreas; Wegman, Günter; Zinke, Dieter (2012). Deutschlands Generale und Admirale: Teil V/Band 3: Die Generale der Waffen-SS und der Polizei. (Lammerding - Plesch). Biblio-Verlag. ISBN 978-3-764-82375-7.
- Yerger, Mark C. (1997). Allgemeine-SS: The Commands, Units and Leaders of the General SS. Schiffer Publishing Ltd. ISBN 0-7643-0145-4.
