= Regional Command =

Regional Command may refer to:

- Regional Command (British Army), a two-star command of the British Army
- Regional Military Command, Indonesian military districts
- Allgemeine-SS regional commands, Schutzstaffel (SS) commands during the Nazi era, covering Austria and Germany
- Regional Command of the Arab Socialist Ba'ath Party – Iraq Region, highest decision-making organ of the Iraqi Regional Branch of the Arab Socialist Ba'ath Party
- Regional Command of the Arab Socialist Ba'ath Party – Syria Region, highest decision-making organ of the Syrian Regional Branch of the Arab Socialist Ba'ath Party, merged into the party's National Command to form the Central Command
