= Paul Zimmermann (SS-Brigadeführer) =

SS and Police Leader and SS-Brigadeführer

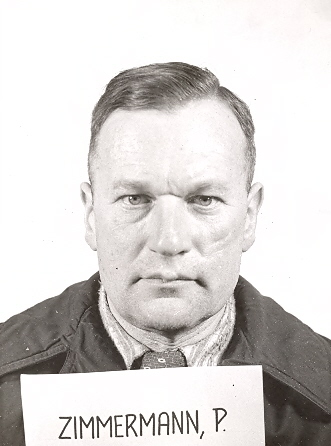
- Zimmermann in Allied internment, c.1945–1949
- Born: 2 July 1895; Münster, Province of Westphalia, Kingdom of Prussia, German Empire
- Died: 21 May 1980 (age 84); Münster, West Germany
- Military career
- Allegiance: German Empire; Nazi Germany
- Branch: Imperial German Army; Schutzstaffel
- Service years: 1914–1918; 1936–1945
- Rank: Hauptmann of reserves SS-Brigadeführer and Generalmajor of police
- Commands: SS and Police Leader, "Nikolajew"
- Conflicts: World War I World War II
- Awards: Iron Cross, 1st and 2nd class Clasp to the Iron Cross, 2nd class War Merit Cross, 1st and 2nd class with Swords

Paul Zimmermann (2 July 1895 – 21 May 1980) was a German Nazi SS-Brigadeführer and Generalmajor of police. During the Second World War he served as the SS and Police Leader in Nikolajew (today, Mykolaiv). He was also a member of the Economic Staff East, which planned and implemented exploitation of the occupied Soviet Union.

== Early life ==
Zimmermann was born in Münster, the son of a state building supervisor. After attending school in Hanover and receiving his abitur, Zimmermann entered the Imperial German Army and fought in the First World War, earning the Iron Cross, 1st and 2nd class. Discharged with the rank of Hauptmann of reserves, he returned to civilian life and studied civil engineering, passing his state examinations in 1924 and obtaining an advanced degree in engineering (Dipl. Ing.), specializing in roadways and railways.

== Peacetime Nazi and SS career ==
In 1931, Zimmermann joined the Nazi Party (membership number 940,783). In 1932 he became a representative of the Party's labor organization (Nationalsozialistischer Arbeitsdienst) in Gau Westphalia-North. In 1933 he served briefly as a Nazi deputy in the Landtag of the Province of Westphalia, before its dissolution in the Nazi consolidation of power. That spring, Zimmermann was appointed the North Westphalia District Leader of the newly created Reich Labor Service (Reichsarbeitsdienst) and held this position until June 1936.

On 1 August 1933, Zimmermann joined the SS as an SS-Standartenführer (SS number 276,856). He was posted to the SS Main Office in Berlin and then became head of the Plön branch of the National Political Institutes of Education, elite preparatory schools charged with educating future leaders of Nazi Germany. In 1937 he was assigned to the Reich Ministry of Economics as head of the Reich Office for Metals. As Reich Commissioner for Metals he was a member of the Board of Trustees of the Kaiser Wilhelm Institute for Metal Research from October 1938.

From 1 October 1937 through 30 June 1938, Zimmermann was the Chief of Staff (Stabschef) of SS-Oberabschnitt (Main Section) "Elbe," headquartered in Dresden. He was promoted to SS-Oberführer on 20 April 1938.

== Second World War ==
Zimmermann was promoted to SS-Brigadeführer on 1 August 1940, and following the German invasion of the Soviet Union in June 1941, he was appointed as a War Administrator on the Economic Staff East, which planned and organized the economic exploitation of the German-occupied Soviet territories. In 1942, he was attached to an economic policy group in the Reich Ministry for the Occupied Eastern Territories. In addition, in 1942 to early 1943 he was the liaison officer from the Reich Ministry to the High Command of the Wehrmacht (OKW). He was also involved in planning for the future occupation of Azerbaijan, and the exploitation of its rich oil resources which were to be used in the German war effort.

In January 1943 Zimmermann was appointed Generalmajor of police. From mid-February 1943 he was posted to the office of SS-Obergruppenführer Erich von dem Bach-Zelewski, the Higher SS and Police Leader (HSSPF) Russland-Mitte (Central Russia) in Mogilev. In April 1943 he was appointed SS and Police Leader (SSPF) of the Nikolajew region, succeeding SS-Brigadeführer Waldemar Wappenhans. In this post, he commanded all SS personnel and police in his jurisdiction, including the Ordnungspolizei (Orpo; regular uniformed police), the SD (intelligence service) and the SiPo (security police), which included the Gestapo (secret police). He remained in Nikolajew until 10 October 1943 and then was transferred to become an SSPF for special duties on the staff of SS-Obergruppenführer Hans-Adolf Prützmann, the Supreme SS and Police Leader (HöSSPF) in Russland-Süd (Southern Russia). In early 1944, Zimmermann was deployed to the Italian Social Republic under HöSSPF SS-Obergruppenführer Karl Wolff. His last assignment from September 1944 to the end of the war was as the motor vehicle transport chief for OKW. During the course of the war, he was awarded a Clasp to the Iron Cross, 2nd class.

== Postwar activity ==
At the end of the war, Zimmermann was taken prisoner and interned by the Americans. He was interrogated as a witness at the Nuremberg Trials and subsequently worked in industry. In 1952, he joined the so-called Naumann Circle, a group of former Nazis who attempted to infiltrate West Germany's Free Democratic Party. In connection with this, he was arrested along with ringleader Werner Naumann and five others on 14–15 January 1953, but released on 16 June and never brought to trial.

== Literature ==
- Gerlach, Christian (1999). Calculated murders. The German economic and extermination policy in Belarus from 1941 to 1944. Hamburg: Hamburger Edition.
- Klee, Ernst (2007). Das Personenlexikon zum Dritten Reich. Wer war was vor und nach 1945. Frankfurt-am-Main: Fischer-Taschenbuch-Verlag. ISBN 978-3-596-16048-8.
- Schiffer Publishing Ltd., ed. (2000). SS Officers List: SS-Standartenführer to SS-Oberstgruppenführer (As of 30 January 1942). Schiffer Military History Publishing. ISBN 0-7643-1061-5.
- Yerger, Mark C. (1997). Allgemeine-SS: The Commands, Units and Leaders of the General SS. Schiffer Publishing Ltd. ISBN 0-7643-0145-4.
