= Heinz Roch =

SS and Police Leader and SS-Oberführer (1905–1945)

- Born: 17 January 1905; Essen, Kingdom of Prussia, German Empire
- Died: 10 May 1945 (age 40); Trondheim, Norway
- Military career
- Allegiance: Nazi Germany
- Branch: Schutzstaffel
- Service years: 1930-1945
- Rank: SS-Oberführer and Oberst of Police
- Commands: SS and Police Leader, "Taurien-Krim-Simferopol;" "Bialystok;" "Nord Norwegen"; Commander of SiPo and SD, "Simferopol"
- Conflicts: World War II
- Awards: Iron Cross, 1st and 2nd class War Merit Cross, 1st and 2nd class with Swords

Heinz Roch (17 January 1905 – 10 May 1945) was a German Nazi Party politician, SS-Oberführer and SS and Police Leader (SSPF) in the Crimea, the Bialystok District and northern Norway during the Second World War. He committed suicide at the end of the war.

== Early life ==
Roch, the son of a laborer, was born in Essen and was educated through trade school. He then held a variety of jobs, in agriculture, forestry, manufacturing and mining. He eventually worked at a car dealership from 1928 to 1931. He joined the Nazi Party in 1922, and as an early member would later be awarded the Golden Party Badge. In 1923 he was arrested by French authorities for political agitation and sabotage in opposition to the occupation of the Ruhr. He was briefly imprisoned but released due to an amnesty. During the period when the Nazi Party was outlawed, he was a member of the "Frontbann". After the ban on the Party was lifted, he joined its paramilitary organization, the Sturmabteilung (SA), in May 1926 and joined the re-founded Party on 19 June 1926 (membership number 34,475).

== Peacetime SS and political career ==
Roch left the SA and joined the SS on 1 August 1930 (member number 2,883). Commissioned an officer in August 1931, he led SS company and battalion formations before taking command of the 25th SS-Standarte in Essen from July 1932 to December 1933, being promoted to SS-Standartenführer in November 1932. He went on to command the 46th SS-Standarte in Dresden (December 1933 to April 1934) and the 7th SS-Standarte in Plauen (April to May 1934). At that point, he was promoted to SS-Oberführer and took over the prestigious post of commander of SS-Abschnitt (District) I in Munich, the headquarters of the Party. He would remain there until 15 March 1936 when he very briefly led SS-Abschnitt XXXII in Augsburg before moving on to command the 18th SS-Standarte in Königsberg from 1 April 1936 until 1 March 1937. His next posting was again a district-wide command at SS-Abschnitt XXII, headquartered in Allenstein. He would retain this command for the duration of his career.

During these years Roch also was active as a politician, becoming in 1933 a member of the Landtag of Prussia until its dissolution the next year. He also served during that time in the provincial parliament of the Rhine Province. Then in November 1933, he was elected to the Reichstag from constituency 23 (Düsseldorf-West), serving one term there until the next election in March 1936.

== Second World War ==
After the outbreak of the Second World War, Roch joined the Waffen-SS as an SS-Untersturmführer of reserves and took part in the battle of France as a member of the SS-Totenkopf Division. He was promoted to SS-Obersturmführer with the 1st SS Panzer Division Leibstandarte SS Adolf Hitler on 1 September 1941. He left the Waffen-SS for police duties in January 1942, and was assigned to the office of SS-Obergruppenführer Erich von dem Bach-Zelewski, the Higher SS and Police Leader "Russland-Mitte" (Central Russia). He was placed in charge of security for the construction of Durchgangsstrasse IV, a main military supply road stretching from Lwow in the General Government through the Reichskommissariat Ukraine to Rostow. He was promoted to Oberst of Police in April 1942 and named Inspector of the project through February 1943. Part of his duties included protecting the road from attacks by partisans.

On 3 March 1943 Roch was appointed Acting SS and Police Leader (SSPF) "Taurien-Krim-Simferopol", serving as the Deputy to SS-Gruppenführer Ludolf von Alvensleben until 6 October when Alvensleben left, and then as the permanent replacement until 25 December 1943. In addition, from May 1943 to May 1944 he was Commander of the Security Police (SiPo) and SD in Simferopol and the last garrison commander of that city. He was then briefly assigned, until mid-July 1944, to the office of SS-Obergruppenführer Hans-Adolf Prützmann, the Supreme SS and Police Leader (HöSSPF) Ukraine. Roch next was transferred from 18 July to 22 October 1944 to become the last SSPF "Bialystok" before it was overrun by the Red Army. His last wartime posting was as SSPF "Nord Norwegen" (Northern Norway) from 21 November 1944 to the end of the war in Europe, May 8, 1945.

Before being captured, Roch committed suicide in Trondheim on 10 May 1945.

== Sources ==
- Klee, Ernst (2007). Das Personenlexikon zum Dritten Reich. Wer war was vor und nach 1945. Frankfurt-am-Main: Fischer-Taschenbuch-Verlag. ISBN 978-3-596-16048-8.
- Schiffer Publishing Ltd., ed. (2000). SS Officers List: SS-Standartenführer to SS-Oberstgruppenführer (As of 30 January 1942). Schiffer Military History Publishing. ISBN 0-7643-1061-5.
- Yerger, Mark C. (1997). Allgemeine-SS: The Commands, Units and Leaders of the General SS. Schiffer Publishing Ltd. ISBN 0-7643-0145-4.
