= SS and Police Leader =

Senior Nazi SS and police official

The title of SS and Police Leader (German: SS- und Polizeiführer) designated a senior Nazi Party (NSDAP) official who commanded various components of the Schutzstaffel (SS) and the Ordnungspolizei (Orpo; regular uniformed police), before and during World War II in the German Reich proper and in the occupied territories.

== Levels ==
Three levels of subordination were established for holders of this title:

- SS and Police Leader (SS- und Polizeiführer, SSPF)
- Higher SS and Police Leader (Höherer SS- und Polizeiführer, HSSPF)
- Supreme SS and Police Leader (Höchster SS- und Polizeiführer, HöSSPF)

== Establishment ==
The office of Höherer SS- und Polizeiführer (Higher SS and Police Leader, HSSPF) was authorized by a decree of 13 November 1937, signed by Reich Interior Minister Wilhelm Frick. This decree authorized the creation of HSSPF in each of the 13 German armed forces Wehrkreise (military districts) in the German Reich, but only in the event of mobilization. At that time, the HSSPF would serve as deputies under the jurisdiction of Heinrich Himmler, Reichsführer-SS and chief of the German police, for the purpose of leading, coordinating and integrating all local and regional SS and police formations into the defense organization of the Reich. The first HSSPF activated were those appointed in the Wehrkreise bordering Austria during the Anschluss crisis in March 1938, and Czechoslovakia during the summer and autumn of the same year.

The Oberabschnitte were the Allgemeine-SS regional commands in each of the Wehrkreise. Their commanders carried the title of SS-Oberabschnittsführer (SS Main District Leader) and usually held the rank of Gruppenführer or Obergruppenführer. The SS-Oberabschnitte were subordinated to the HSSPF; however, in nearly every instance, the SS-Oberabschnittsführer held both positions simultaneously. The purpose of the Higher SS and Police Leader was to be a direct command authority for every SS and police unit in these given geographical regions, answering only to Himmler and, through him, to Adolf Hitler. They were to act as Himmler's chief liaison to, and unifier of, all Allgemeine SS and police components in a region.

After the March 1938 Anschluss when Austria was absorbed into the German Reich, two new Wehrkreise and corresponding HSSPF were established there. Likewise, after the October 1939 conquest of Poland, two additional Wehrkreise and corresponding HSSPF were created for those Polish areas that were directly incorporated into the Reich.

In all other occupied territories, no Wehrkreise were established, so the HSSPF were independent commands with several subordinate SS- und Polizeiführer (SS and Police Leader, SSPF) commands reporting to them. These positions were created beginning in November 1939 to assist the HSSPF in administering the large areas under their jurisdiction.

Finally, in the autumn of 1943, Himmler created two Höchster SS- und Polizeiführer (Supreme SS and Police Leader, HöSSPF) posts with jurisdiction over very large territories; these were Italien (1943–1945) and Ukraine (1943–1944), each of which had both HSSPF and SSPF reporting to them.

== Operations ==
Within given areas, SS and Police Leaders commanded and controlled multiple SS and police units. This typically included the Ordnungspolizei (Orpo; regular police), SiPo (security police), including the Gestapo (secret police) and Kriminalpolizei (Kripo; criminal poilce), Totenkopfverbände (SS-TV; Nazi concentration camps), and SD (intelligence service). Most of the HSSPF normally held the rank of SS-Gruppenführer or above, and answered directly to Himmler in all matters pertaining to the SS within their area of responsibility. Most SSPF normally held the rank of SS-Oberführer or SS-Brigadeführer and reported to their HSSPF. The role of all SS and Police Leaders was to be part of the SS control mechanism within their jurisdiction, policing the population and overseeing the activities of the SS men within each respective district. The HSSPF could bypass the chain of command of the administrative offices for the SS, SD, SiPo, SS-TV, Waffen-SS and Orpo in their district under the "guise of an emergency situation", thereby gaining direct operational control of these groups.

Himmler authorized SS and Police Bases (SS- und Polizeistützpunkte) to be established in occupied Poland and occupied areas of the Soviet Union. They were to be "armed industrialized agricultural complexes" to maintain order where they were established. This did not go beyond the planning stage.

In 1944 and 1945, many HSSPF were promoted to their corresponding general's rank in the Waffen-SS by Himmler. This was apparently an attempt to provide potential protection for them, by giving them combatant status under the Hague Convention rules of warfare.

== War crimes and crimes against humanity ==
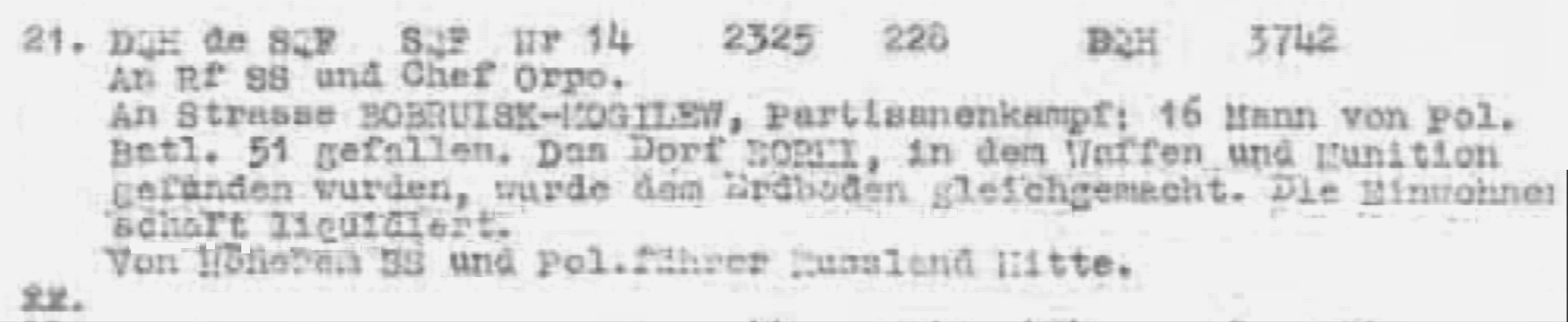
Decrypted wireless telegram from "HSSPF Russland Mitte" (middle Russia) in 1942, reporting to Himmler the 'liquidation' of a village in Belarus (from NSA report)

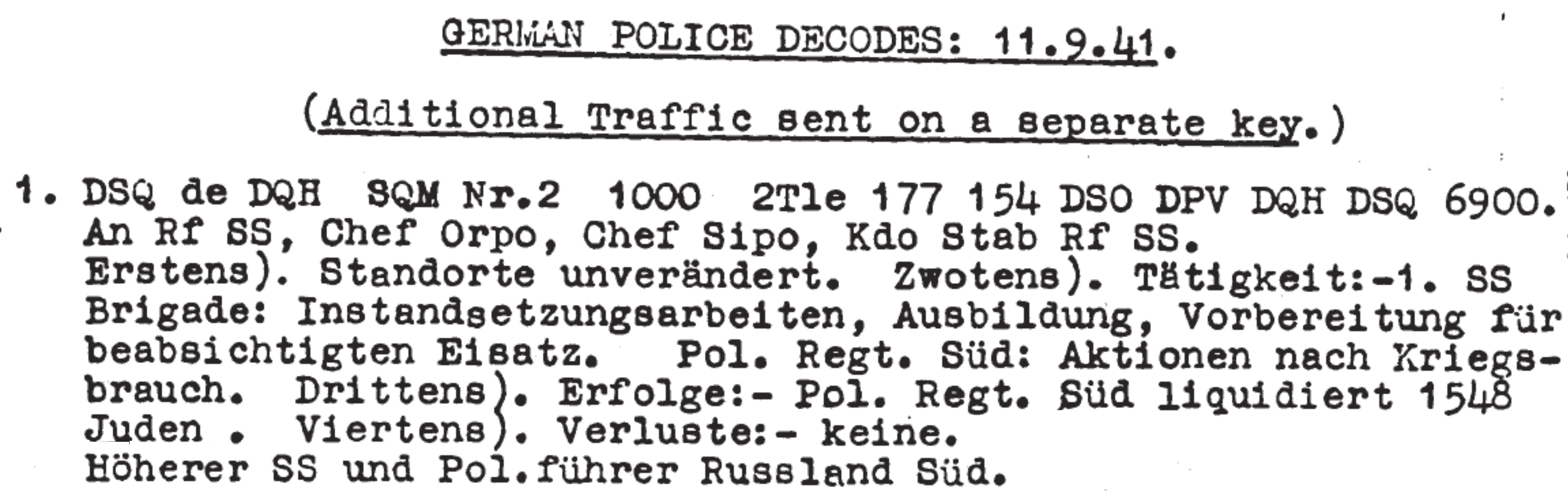
Another decrypt, 1941, HSSPF Russland Sud (south Russia), reporting to Himmler the 'liquidation' of Jewish people (from NSA report)

The SS and Police Leaders were key figures in many of the war crimes committed by SS personnel. The HSSPF served as commanding SS generals for any Einsatzgruppen (death squads) operating in their area. This entailed ordering the deaths of tens of thousands of persons. In addition, they launched anti-partisan operations and directed police units to acquire forced labor for war-related projects.

The SS and Police Leaders were the overseeing authority of the Jewish ghettos in Poland and directly coordinated deportations to Nazi extermination camps. They had direct command over Order Police battalions and SD regiments that were assigned to guard the ghettos. The HSSPF regularly provided SS and police guards and other support personnel for the transports to the death camps, and also negotiated with the agencies and ministries of the Reich for rolling stock, supplies and provisions, rail schedules, and an array of other requirements necessary to keep the roundups and the death trains moving efficiently. And, in the satellite and client states, the HSSPF negotiated directly with the puppet or collaborationist governments to hand over their Jews for deportation to the East. Finally, the HSSPF were also directly involved in the construction and operation of the extermination camps. Following the end of the war, many SS and Police Leaders, particularly those who had served in Poland and the Soviet Union, either committed suicide or were charged with war crimes and crimes against humanity.

== Tables ==
There were two HöSSPF commands and 38 HSSPF commands, 19 in the Reich and 19 in the occupied lands. Most of these had several different commanders over the lifetime of the post. Similarly, there were 49 SSPF commands subordinated to those HSSPF leaders in the occupied territories, also with multiple commanders over the years. Some of these areas were renamed, merged, or dissolved during the duration of their existence, particularly as German military control over the eastern territories was relentlessly eroded later in the war.

The tables below provide as complete an accounting of the SS and police commands and their leaders as is known. They list the permanent appointees, but omit any substitutes who temporarily acted in that capacity when the incumbent was on leave or on another assignment.

Table of Supreme SS and Police Leader (HöSSPF) Commands
| SS Designation | Area | HQ | HöSSPF | Dates |
|---|---|---|---|---|
| Italien | Italy | Rome; Verona; Bolzano | Karl Wolff | September 1943 – May 1945 |
| Ukraine | Ukraine | Kiev | Hans-Adolf Prützmann | October 1943 – September 1944 |

Table of Higher SS and Police Leader (HSSPF) Commands in the German Reich (By Wehrkreis)
| SS Designation | Wehrkreis | Area | HQ | HSSPF | Dates |
|---|---|---|---|---|---|
| Nordost | I | East Prussia | Königsberg | Wilhelm Rediess; Jakob Sporrenberg; Hans-Adolf Prützmann | June 1938 – June 1940; June 1940 – May 1941; May 1941 – May 1945 |
| Ostsee (Nord prior to April 1940) | II | Pomerania; Mecklenburg | Stettin | Emil Mazuw | August 1938 – May 1945 |
| Spree (Ost prior to November 1939) | III | Berlin; Brandenburg | Berlin | August Heissmeyer | September 1939 – May 1945 |
| Elbe | IV | Saxony; Halle-Merseburg | Dresden | Theodor Berkelmann; Udo von Woyrsch; Ludolf-Hermann von Alvensleben | June 1938 – April 1940; April 1940 – February 1944; February 1944 – May 1945 |
| Südwest | V | Württemberg; Baden; Alsace | Stuttgart | Kurt Kaul; Otto Hofmann | September 1939 – April 1943; April 1943 – May 1945 |
| West | VI | Westphalia; Northern Rheinland | Düsseldorf | Fritz Weitzel; Theodor Berkelmann; Friedrich Jeckeln; Karl Gutenberger | June 1938 – April 1940; April 1940 – July 1940; July 1940 – June 1941; July 1941 – May 1945 |
| Süd | VII | Upper Bavaria; Swabia | Munich | Karl von Eberstein; Wilhelm Koppe | March 1938 – April 1945; April 1945 – May 1945 |
| Südost | VIII | Silesia | Breslau | Erich von dem Bach-Zelewski; Ernst-Heinrich Schmauser; Richard Hildebrandt | June 1938 – May 1941; May 1941 – February 1945; February 1945 – May 1945 |
| Fulda-Werra | IX | Hesse; Hesse-Nassau; Thuringia | Arolsen | Josias zu Waldeck und Pyrmont | October 1938 – May 1945 |
| Nordsee (Nordwest prior to April 1940) | X | Schleswig-Holstein; Northern Hanover; Hamburg; Oldenburg; Bremen | Hamburg | Hans-Adolf Prützmann; Rudolf Querner; Georg-Henning Graf von Bassewitz-Behr | June 1938 – April 1941; May 1941 – January 1943; February 1943 – May 1945 |
| Mitte | XI | Anhalt; Brunswick; Southern Hanover; Magdeburg | Hanover | Friedrich Jeckeln; Günther Pancke; Wilhelm Fuchs; Hermann Höfle; Rudolf Querner | June 1938 – July 1940; July 1940 – July 1943; July 1943 – September 1943; September 1943 – October 1944; October 1944 – May 1945 |
| Rhein (Merged with Westmark in May 1943 to form Rhein-Westmark) | XII | Southern Rheinland; Palatinate; Saarland (to July 1940); Luxembourg (from July 1940) | Wiesbaden | Richard Hildebrandt; Jakob Sporrenberg; Erwin Rösener; Theodor Berkelmann | April 1939 – October 1939; October 1939 – July 1940; July 1940– November 1941; December 1941 – May 1943 |
| Westmark (Lothringen-Saarpfalz prior to February 1941) (Merged with Rhein in May 1943 to form Rhein-Westmark) | XII | Saarland; Lorraine | Metz; Saarbrücken | Theodor Berkelmann | July 1940 – May 1943 |
| Rhein-Westmark | XII | Southern Rheinland; Palatinate; Luxembourg; Saarland; Lorraine | Wiesbaden | Theodor Berkelmann; Jürgen Stroop | May 1943 – November 1943; November 1943 – May 1945 |
| Main | XIII | Franconia; Lower Bavaria; Upper Palatinate | Nuremberg | Karl von Eberstein; Benno Martin | March 1938 – December 1942; December 1942 – May 1945 |
| Donau | XVII | Lower Austria; Upper Austria | Vienna | Ernst Kaltenbrunner; Rudolf Querner; Walter Schimana | September 1938 – January 1943; January 1943 – October 1944; October 1944 – May 1945 |
| Alpenland | XVIII | Carinthia; Salzburg; Styria; Tyrol; Vorarlberg | Salzburg | Alfred Rodenbücher; Gustav Adolf Scheel; Erwin Rösener | April 1939 – April 1941; April 1941 – November 1941; November 1941 – May 1945 |
| Weichsel | XX | Reichsgau Danzig-West Prussia | Danzig | Richard Hildebrandt; Fritz Katzmann | September 1939 – April 1943; April 1943 – May 1945 |
| Warthe | XXI | Reichsgau Wartheland | Posen | Wilhelm Koppe; Theodor Berkelmann; Heinz Reinefarth; Willy Schmelcher | October 1939 – November 1943; November 1943 – December 1943; January 1944 – December 1944; December 1944 – May 1945 |

Table of Higher SS and Police Leader (HSSPF) Commands in the Occupied Territories (Note: A further HSSPF command, to be known as Kaukasien was planned for the Caucasus in 1942 to be commanded by Gerret Korsemann but was never activated. The six SSPF commands that were to be subordinated to it were instead assigned to HSSPF Russland-Süd. (Yerger, 1997, p.44)) (By date of establishment)
| SS Designation | Area | HQ | HSSPF | Dates |
|---|---|---|---|---|
| Böhmen und Mähren | Protectorate of Bohemia and Moravia | Prague | Karl Hermann Frank; Richard Hildebrandt | April 1939 – April 1945; April 1945 – May 1945 |
| Ost | General Government | Kracow | Theodor Eicke; Friedrich-Wilhelm Krüger; Wilhelm Koppe | September 1939; October 1939 – November 1943; November 1943 – May 1945 |
| Nord | Norway | Oslo | Fritz Weitzel; Wilhelm Rediess | April 1940 – June 1940; June 1940 – May 1945 |
| Nordwest | Netherlands | The Hague | Hanns Albin Rauter | June 1940 – May 1945 |
| Ostland und Russland-Nord | Reichskommissariat Ostland | Riga | Hans-Adolf Prützmann; Friedrich Jeckeln; Hermann Behrends | June 1941 – October 1941; November 1941 – January 1945; February 1945 – May 1945 |
| Russland-Mitte (To April 1943); Russland-Mitte und Weissruthenia | Belarus | Mogilev; Minsk | Erich von dem Bach-Zelewski; Curt von Gottberg | June 1941 – June 1944; July 1944 – August 1944 |
| Russland-Süd (Subordinated to HöSSPF Ukraine from October 1943) | Reichskommissariat Ukraine | Kiev | Friedrich Jeckeln; Hans-Adolf Prützmann | June 1941 – October 1941; November 1941 – March 1944 |
| Serbien, Montenegro und Sandschak | Serbia; Montenegro | Belgrade | August Meyszner; Hermann Behrends | January 1942 – April 1944; April 1944 – October 1944 |
| Frankreich | Occupied France | Paris | Carl Oberg | May 1942 – November 1944 |
| Kroatien | Croatia | Zagreb | Konstantin Kammerhofer | March 1943 – January 1945 |
| Operationszone Adriatisches Küstenland (Subordinated to HöSSPF Italien) | Operational Zone of the Adriatic Littoral | Trieste | Odilo Globocnik | September 1943 – May 1945 |
| Griechenland | Greece | Athens | Jürgen Stroop; Walter Schimana; Hermann Franz | September 1943 – October 1943; October 1943 – September 1944; September 1944 – November 1944 |
| Schwarzes Meer (Subordinated to HöSSPF Ukraine from October 1943) | Black Sea coast | Nikolajew | Ludolf-Hermann von Alvensleben; Richard Hildebrandt | October 1943 – December 1943; December 1943 – September 1944 |
| Dänemark | Denmark | Copenhagen | Günther Pancke | October 1943 – May 1945 |
| Ungarn | Kingdom of Hungary (1920–1946) | Budapest | Otto Winkelmann | March 1944 – February 1945 |
| Belgien-Nordfrankreich | Reichskommissariat of Belgium and Northern France | Brussels | Richard Jungclaus; Friedrich Jeckeln | August 1944 – September 1944; September 1944 – January 1945 |
| Albanien | Albania | Tirana | Josef Fitzthum | August 1944 – December 1944 |
| Slowakei | Slovak Republic (1939–1945) | Pressburg | Gottlob Berger; Hermann Höfle | August 1944 – September 1944; September 1944 – May 1945 |
| Siebenbürgen | Transylvania | – | Richard Hildebrandt; Artur Phleps | August 1944 – September 1944; September 1944 |

Table of SS and Police Leader (SSPF) Commands
| SS Designation | Reported to HSSPF or HöSSPF* of | SS and Police Leader | Dates |
|---|---|---|---|
| Aserbeidschan** | Russland-Süd | Konstantin Kammerhofer | November 1942 – April 1943 |
| Awdejewka** | Russland-Süd; Ukraine* | Karl-Heinz Bürger | October 1942 – December 1943 |
| Bergvölker-Ordshonikidse** | Russland-Süd | Wilhelm Günther | May 1942 – August 1942 |
| Bialystok | Russland-Mitte (To April 1943); Russland-Mitte und Weissruthenia | Werner Fromm; Otto Hellwig; Heinz Roch | January 1942 – January 1943; May 1943 – July 1944; July 1944 – October 1944 |
| Bozen | Italien* | Karl Brunner | September 1943 – May 1945 |
| Charkow | Russland-Süd | Willy Tensfeld; Hans Haltermann; Günther Merk | August 1941 – May 1943; May 1943 – September 1943; September 1943 – October 1943 |
| Dnjepropetrowsk-Krivoi-Rog | Russland-Süd; Ukraine* | Georg-Henning Graf von Bassewitz-Behr; Hermann Harm; Waldemar Wappenhans; Karl Schäfer | November 1941 – August 1942; August 1942 – October 1942; October 1942 – October 1943; October 1943 – November 1943 |
| Estland | Ostland und Russland-Nord | Hinrich Möller; Walther Schröder | August 1941 – April 1944; April 1944 – October 1944 |
| Friaul (Renamed Adriatische-West, April 1945) | Operationszone Adriatisches Küstenland | Ludolf Jakob von Alvensleben | October 1944 – May 1945 |
| Görz | Operationszone Adriatisches Küstenland | Karl Taus | May 1944 – May 1945 |
| Istrien | Operationszone Adriatisches Küstenland | Johann-Erasmus Freiherr von Malsen-Ponickau | October 1944 – May 1945 |
| Kattowitz | Südost | Christoph Diehm | October 1944 – May 1945 |
| Kaukasien-Kuban** | Russland-Süd | Konstantin Kammerhofer; Theobald Thier | August 1942 – November 1942; November 1942 – May 1943 |
| Kertsch-Tamanhalbinsel** | Russland-Süd | Theobald Thier | May 1943 – July 1943 |
| Kiew | Russland-Süd; Ukraine* | Hans Haltermann; Paul Hennicke | October 1941 – May 1943; May 1943 – December 1943 |
| Krakau | Ost (General Government) | Karl Zech; Hans Schwedler; Julian Scherner; Theobald Thier | November 1939 – October 1940; October 1940 – August 1941; August 1941 – March 1944; March 1944 – January 1945 |
| Lemberg | Ost (General Government) | Fritz Katzmann; Theobald Thier; Christoph Diehm | August 1941 – April 1943; July 1943 – February 1944; February 1944 – September 1944 |
| Lettland | Ostland und Russland-Nord | Walther Schröder | August 1941 – October 1944 |
| Litauen | Ostland und Russland-Nord | Lucian Wysocki; Hermann Harm; Kurt Hintze | August 1941 – July 1943; July 1943 – April 1944; April 1944 – September 1944 |
| Lublin | Ost (General Government) | Odilo Globocnik; Jakob Sporrenberg | November 1939 – August 1943; August 1943 – November 1944 |
| Metz | Rhein-Westmark | Anton Dunckern | October 1944 – November 1944 |
| Mittelitalien-Verona | Italien* | Karl-Heinz Bürger | December 1943 – May 1945 |
| Mitte-Norwegen | Nord | Richard Kaaserer | November 1944 – May 1945 |
| Mogilew | Russland-Mitte (To April 1943); Russland-Mitte und Weissruthenia | Georg-Henning Graf von Bassewitz-Behr; Franz Kutschera; Hans Haltermann | August 1942 – April 1943; April 1943 – September 1943; September 1943 – July 1944 |
| Montenegro | Serbien, Montenegro und Sandschak | Richard Fiedler | October 1943 – October 1944 |
| Nikolajew | Russland-Süd; Ukraine* | Fritz Tittmann; Waldemar Wappenhans; Paul Zimmermann; Ludolf-Hermann von Alvensleben | October 1941 – September 1942; September 1942 – April 1943; April 1943 – October 1943; October 1943 – February 1944 |
| Nord-Kaukasien** | Russland-Süd | Karl-Heinz Bürger | August 1942 – October 1942 |
| Nord-Norwegen | Nord | Heinz Roch | November 1944 – May 1945 |
| Ober-Elsaß | Südwest | Friedrich Suhr | December 1944 – May 1945 |
| Oberitalien-Mitte | Italien* | Ernst-Albrecht Hildebrandt | April 1944 – October 1944 |
| Oberitalien-West | Italien* | Willy Tensfeld | January 1944 – May 1945 |
| Pripet | Russland-Mitte und Weissruthenia | Ernst Hartmann | December 1943 – September 1944 |
| Quarnero | Operationszone Adriatisches Küstenland | Wilhelm Traub | October 1944 – May 1945 |
| Radom | Ost (General Government) | Fritz Katzmann; Carl Oberg; Herbert Böttcher | November 1939 – August 1941; August 1941 – May 1942; May 1942 – January 1945 |
| Rostow-Awdejewka | Russland-Süd | Richard Wendler; Gerret Korsemann; Paul Hennicke | January 1942 – May 1942; May 1942 – October 1942; October 1942 – May 1943 |
| Rowno (Renamed Wolhynien-Luzk, September 1942) | Russland-Süd; Ukraine* | Gerret Korsemann; Waldemar Wappenhans; Wilhelm Günther; Ernst Hartmann | August 1941 – January 1942; January 1942 – August 1942; September 1942 – June 1944; June 1944 – September 1944 |
| Salzburg | Alpenland | Erwin Schulz | April 1945 – May 1945 |
| Sandschak | Serbien, Montenegro und Sandschak | Karl von Krempler; Richard Kaaserer | September 1943 – June 1944; June 1944 – November 1944 |
| Saratow | Russland-Mitte | Walter Schimana | September 1941 – November 1941 |
| Shitomir | Russland-Süd; Ukraine* | Otto Hellwig; Willy Schmelcher; Ernst Hartmann; Christoph Diehm | October 1941 – May 1943; May 1943 – September 1943; October 1943 – January 1944; January 1944 – February 1944 |
| Stalino-Donezgebiet | Russland-Süd | Hans Döring; Willy Tensfeld | November 1941 – May 1943; May 1943 – September 1943 |
| Stanislav-Rostow (Renamed Rostow-Awdejewka, January 1942) | Russland-Süd | Richard Wendler | August 1941 – January 1942 |
| Süd-Norwegen | Nord | Jakob Sporrenberg | November 1944 – May 1945 |
| Taurien-Krim-Simferopol | Russland-Süd; Ukraine* | Ludolf-Hermann von Alvensleben; Heinz Roch; Richard Hildebrandt | November 1941 – October 1943; October 1943 – December 1943; December 1943 – September 1944 |
| Triest | Operationszone Adriatisches Küstenland | Georg Michalsen | October 1944 – May 1945 |
| Tschernigow | Russland-Süd | Ludolf-Hermann von Alvensleben; Willy Schmelcher; Ernst Hartmann | October 1941 – November 1941; November 1941 – July 1943; July 1943 – October 1943 |
| Warsaw | Ost (General Government) | Paul Moder; Arpad Wigand; Jürgen Stroop; Franz Kutschera; Paul Otto Geibel | November 1939 – July 1941; August 1941 – April 1943; April 1943 – September 1943; September 1943 – February 1944; March 1944 – February 1945 |
| Weissruthenien (Also known as Minsk) | Ostland und Russland-Nord (To April 1943); Russland-Mitte und Weissruthenia | Jakob Sporrenberg; Carl Zenner; Karl Schäfer; Curt von Gottberg; Erich Ehrlinger | July 1941 – August 1941; August 1941 – May 1942; May 1942 – July 1942; July 1942 – September 1943; September 1943 – April 1944 |
| Wolhynien-Brest-Litovsk (Merged with Rowno, 1 January 1942) | Russland-Süd | Waldemar Wappenhans | September 1941 – December 1941 |

**SSPF originally slated to be assigned to HSSPF Kaukasien.

== See also ==
- List of SS and police commands
- List of Nazi Party leaders and officials
- List of SS personnel
- Glossary of Nazi Germany
