= Ernst Hartmann (SS-Brigadeführer) =

SS and Police Leader and SS-Brigadeführer

- Born: 10 May 1897; Barmen, Rhineland Province, Kingdom of Prussia, German Empire
- Died: 3 May 1945 (age 47); Karlsbad, Nazi Germany
- Military career
- Allegiance: German Empire; Nazi Germany
- Branch: Imperial German Army; Schutzstaffel
- Service years: 1914–1918; 1930–1932; 1937–1945
- Rank: Oberleutnant; SS-Brigadeführer and Generalmajor of Police
- Commands: SS and Police Leader, "Tschernigow;" "Shitomir;" "Pripet;" "Wolhynien-Luzk" (Acting)
- Conflicts: World War I World War II
- Awards: Iron Cross,2nd class Clasp to the Iron Cross, 2nd class War Merit Cross,2nd class with Swords

Ernst Hartmann (10 May 1897 – 3 May 1945) was a German SS-Brigadeführer and Generalmajor of Police who served as an SS and Police Leader in the Soviet Union during the Second World War.

== Early life ==
Hartmann was born in Barmen, the son of a Prussian railway official. After attending volksschule, he studied locksmithing at vocational school. A few months after the outbreak of the First World War, he joined the Imperial German Army in November 1914. He served in the infantry until September 1916 and earned the Iron Cross, 2nd class. He then transferred to the military railroad service until January 1917 when he joined the Luftstreitkräfte. In October 1918, shortly before the end of the war, he was captured by the British and became a prisoner of war.

After his return from captivity, Hartmann was discharged from the service with the rank of Oberleutnant, and worked for several years as an engineer and locksmith for an aircraft manufacturer. He then went to China where he was employed as a flight instructor for the Chinese Air Force from 1925 to 1928. From 1928 to 1930 he worked as an aeronautics engineer in several European countries before returning to Germany in 1930 and landing a job at Junkers Aircraft and Motor Works in 1930, serving as a flight leader from 1933 to 1935.

== SS peacetime career ==
Hartmann joined the Nazi Party on 1 November 1929 (membership number 160,298) and its paramilitary organization, the Sturmabteilung (SA). On 24 October 1930 he left the SA, joined the SS (SS number 8,982) and was assigned to the 21st SS-Standarte, headquartered in Magdeburg. Hartmann left the SS at his own request on 1 October 1932, but rejoined on 20 April 1937 with the rank of SS-Standartenführer. He served as a staff officer in SS-Abschnitt (District) XVI in Magdeburg until March 1939. He was then transferred to the staff of SS-Oberabschnitt Mitte (Main District – Center) based in Braunschweig until 18 August 1939 when he was dismissed from the SS because of alcoholism. However, he managed to be reinstated at his former rank on 1 October 1939, and returned to his staff posting in Braunschweig. He also held a seat on the 23 member panel of honorary lay judges (Liste der ehrenamtlichen Mitglieder des Volksgerichtshofs) in the People's Court from April 1934. Hartmann was promoted to SS-Oberführer on 30 January 1942.

== Second World War ==
Hartmann was trained for police duties and deployed to the occupied Soviet Union to conduct anti-partisan operations. He served as the commander of the second battalion of the 2nd SS Police Regiment from February to late June 1943, deployed to Weißruthenien in the Reichskommissariat Ostland. During this time, his unit participated in Operation Zauberflöte (Operation Magic Flute) in April 1943 in Minsk, in which thousands of suspects were rounded up and hundreds were deported to Germany or incarcerated in labor camps. On 1 July 1943, Hartmann was appointed the last SS and Police Leader (SSPF) "Tshernigow" in northern Ukraine. Leaving that post ahead of the advancing Soviet forces on 31 October 1943, he was named SSPF "Shitomir" in the Reichskommissariat Ukraine (RKU) until 25 January 1944 when the Red Army liberated that area. Meanwhile, on 18 December 1943, Hartmann also had been appointed SSPF "Pripet," headquartered in Pinsk in the northwest area of the RKU. He was the only person to hold this command, and retained this post until it was abolished on 6 September 1944, by which time the area had been overrun by the Red Army.

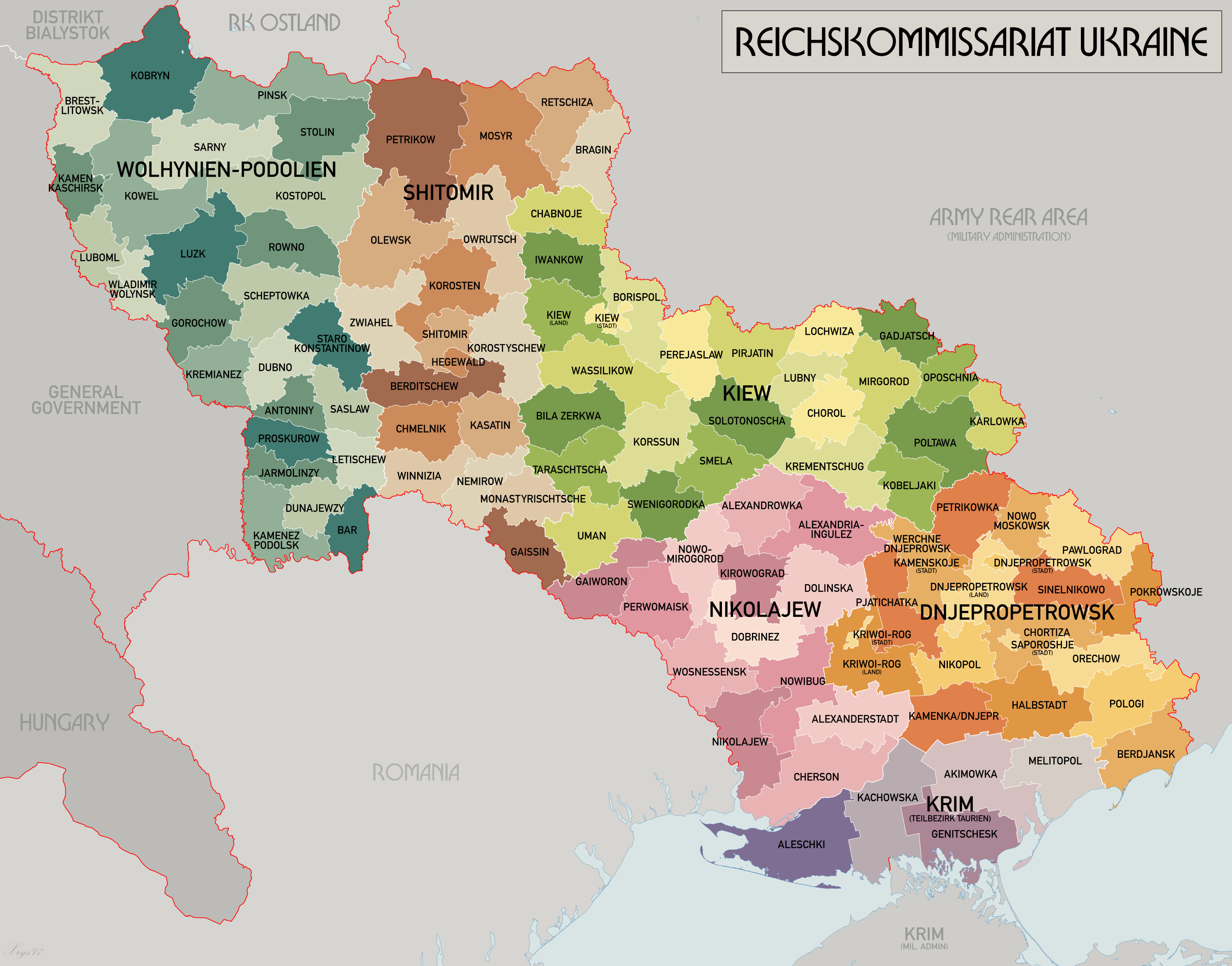
Reichskommissariat Ukraine, showing some of the areas where Hartmann held SSPF commands: Shitomir, Pinsk and Wolhynien-Luzk.

At the same time, Hartmann had been serving since 10 February 1944 as the permanent Deputy to SSPF "Wolhynien-Luzk," SS-Brigadeführer Wilhelm Günther. When Günther was transferred to Trieste, Hartmann replaced him as Acting SSPF on 6 June, becoming the last holder of this command that was dissolved on 6 September. Promoted to SS-Brigadeführer and Generalmajor of Police on 1 August 1944, Hartmann was next assigned as an SSPF for Special Duties in the office of the Higher SS and Police Leader (HSSPF) "Nordost," with headquarters in Königsberg in East Prussia (today, Kaliningrad in Kaliningrad Oblast).

Hartmann died on 3 May 1945 of pancreatic cancer, very shortly before the end of the war in Europe, in a hospital in Karlsbad (today, Karlovy Vary).

== SS ranks ==
- 20 April 1937: SS-Standartenführer
- 30 January 1942: SS-Oberführer
- 1 August 1944: SS-Brigadeführer and Generalmajor of Police

== Sources ==
- Schiffer Publishing Ltd., ed. (2000). SS Officers List: SS-Standartenführer to SS-Oberstgruppenführer (As of 30 January 1942). Schiffer Military History Publishing. ISBN 0-7643-1061-5.
- Yerger, Mark C. (1997). Allgemeine-SS: The Commands, Units and Leaders of the General SS. Schiffer Publishing Ltd. ISBN 0-7643-0145-4.
