= Hermann Behrends =

German Nazi official (1907–1948)

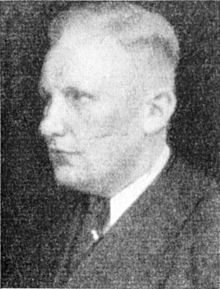
- Behrends, c. 1943
- Born: 11 May 1907; Rüstringen, Grand Duchy of Oldenburg, German Empire
- Died: 4 December 1948 (aged 41); Belgrade, FPR Yugoslavia
- Education: Marburg University
- Occupation: Lawyer
- Years active: 1932–1945
- Organization: Schutzstaffel
- Title: SS-Gruppenführer and Generalleutnant of police
- Political party: Nazi Party
- Status: Executed
- Criminal charges: War crimes
- Penalty: Death by hanging

Hermann Johann Heinrich Behrends (11 May 1907 – 4 December 1948) was a Nazi Party member and SS official with the rank of SS-Gruppenführer and Generalleutnant of police. He served as a Higher SS and Police Leader in Yugoslavia during the Second World War and was tried and executed in Belgrade for war crimes.

Born in Rüstringen, Oldenburg, the son of a provincial innkeeper, he was educated to doctorate level in law at Marburg University but struggled to find employment in an economically depressed Weimar Germany. He joined the Nazi Party in January 1932 and the SS the following month. With no military experience he initially floundered but soon attracted the attentions of Reinhard Heydrich, who valued academic expertise, and he was transferred to the Sicherheitsdienst (SD). Becoming a close friend of Heydrich, Behrends was the first chief of the SD in Berlin.

In March 1939, Behrends was appointed to a seat in the Reichstag as a deputy from the electoral constituency Ostmark, to fill a vacancy caused by the death of Hubert Klausner; he retained this seat until Germany's surrender. He also served as Chief of Staff to Werner Lorenz in his capacity as head of the Hauptamt Volksdeutsche Mittelstelle (VOMI). During the Second World War he was sent to Yugoslavia to lead the regional arm of the VOMI. In March 1944, he was appointed the Higher SS and Police Leader for "Serbien, Montenegro und Sandschak". His star had fallen somewhat after Heydrich's death as Heinrich Himmler was unimpressed by him, sensing that he was too ambitious.

On 5 July 1945, he was captured by the British services in Flensburg. He was interned with the number 560294 in the Island Farm Special Camp in Bridgend, South Wales. Yugoslavia requested his extradition in February 1947 and he was handed over to Yugoslavian authorities later that year. He was placed on trial, convicted and sentenced to death. He was hanged in Belgrade on 4 December 1948. His date of death is sometimes given as 21 December 1947.

== Decorations and awards ==
- 1939 Iron Cross 2nd Class with Swords
- War Merit Cross 1st and 2nd Class with Swords

== Sources ==
- Lumans, Valdis O. (1993). Himmler's auxiliaries : the Volksdeutsche Mittelstelle and the German national minorities of Europe, 1933-1945. Chapel Hill: University of North Carolina Press. ISBN 0-585-02731-5. OCLC 42329294.
- Miller, Michael (2006). Leaders of the SS and German Police, Vol. 1. San Jose, CA: R. James Bender. ISBN 978-93-297-0037-2.
- Snyder, Louis (1994) [1976]. Encyclopedia of the Third Reich. Da Capo Press. ISBN 978-1-56924-917-8.
