= Willy Tensfeld =

SS and Police Leader and SS-Brigadeführer

- Born: 27 November 1893; Bornhöved, Kingdom of Prussia, German Empire
- Died: 2 September 1982 (age 88); Hamburg, West Germany
- Military career
- Allegiance: German Empire; Weimar Republic; Nazi Germany
- Branch: Imperial German Navy; Reichsmarine; Schutzstaffel
- Service years: 1909-1923; 1931-1945
- Rank: SS-Brigadeführer and Generalmajor of Police
- Commands: SS and Police Leader, "Charkov;" "Shitomir" (Acting); "Stalino-Donezgebeit;" "Oberitalien-West"
- Conflicts: World War I World War II
- Awards: Iron Cross, 1st and 2nd class German Cross in Gold; War Merit Cross, 1st and 2nd class with Swords

Willy Tensfeld (27 November 1893 – 2 September 1982) was a German SS-Brigadeführer and Generalmajor of the Police. He served in several SS and Police Leader positions in occupied Ukraine and Italy during the Second World War.

== Early life ==
Tensfeld was born in Bornhöved in the Segeberg district of Schleswig-Holstein. After school, Tensfeld joined the German Imperial Navy in 1909 and was deployed during the First World War with the U-Boat service. After the end of the war he remained in the Reichsmarine under the Weimar Republic until being discharged in 1923. He was then employed at the shipyard in Kiel until 1931. He joined the SS (SS number 14,724) on 1 September 1931 and the Nazi Party (membership number 753,405) in early December.

== Peacetime SS career ==
Tensfeld first served with the 40th SS-Standarte based in Kiel, eventually becoming a battalion adjutant until August 1932. At that time, he was made Chief of Staff in SS-Abschnitt (District) XIV in Bremen until the end of November 1933. His next postings were as commander of the 17th SS-Standarte in Harburg-Wilhelmsburg (1 December 1933 to 16 March 1935) and the 19th SS-Standarte in Münster (16 March 1935 to 1 April 1936). From April 1936 to 1 January 1939 he was commander of SS-Abschitt IX headquartered in Nuremberg (Würzburg from January 1938). From 1 January 1939 to 1 June 1942 he was Chief of Staff in the SS-Oberabschnitt (Main District) "Northwest" (renamed "Nordsee" in April 1940) based in Altona, Hamburg.

== Second World War ==
After the German invasion of the Soviet Union, Tensfeld was appointed the first SS and Police Leader (SSPF) "Charkov" in the Ukraine from 4 August 1941 to 19 May 1943, also serving as the temporary SSPF in "Shitomir" from April to May 1943 when the incumbent, SS-Gruppenführer Otto Hellwig, was on leave. On 19 May 1943, Tensfeld was transferred to succeed SS-Brigadeführer Hans Döring in the post of SSPF "Stalino-Donezgebiet," serving there until 4 September 1943.

Tensfeld was next sent as an SSPF for special assignment under the Supreme SS and Police Leader in Italy, SS-Obergruppenführer Karl Wolff, where he became the German liaison officer to the fascist regime recently established as the Italian Social Republic. Then on 23 January 1944, he was named SSPF "Oberitalien-West" (Upper Italy-West) with his headquarters at Monza in Lombardy. Tensfeld commanded a 3,200-strong German-Italian force, including the 15th SS Police Regiment, that defeated a much larger force of about 6,000 partisans in the recently proclaimed Republic of Ossola between 12 and 17 October 1944. For his actions, Wolff recommended Tensfeld for the German Cross in Gold, which he was awarded on 15 February 1945.

Toward the end of the war, Tensfeld was captured by the British on 30 April 1945 in Monza, and was held as a prisoner of war at the Island Farm Special Camp XI in Bridgend. He was indicted by a British military tribunal in Padua for war crimes against Italian partisans and for the murder of an escaped British POW but was acquitted in April 1947. Released from custody later that year, he returned to Germany and died in Hamburg in 1982.

SS and Police ranks
| Date | Rank |
|---|---|
| March 1932 | SS-Sturmführer |
| October 1932 | SS-Sturmhauptführer |
| January 1933 | SS-Sturmbannführer |
| September 1933 | SS-Obersturmbannführer |
| June 1934 | SS-Standartenführer |
| September 1936 | SS-Oberführer |
| January 1941 | SS-Brigadeführer |
| June 1942 | Generalmajor of Police |

== Awards ==
Below is a partial list of Tensfeld's awards:

- Iron Cross 1st class (September 1943) and 2nd class (March 1943)
- German Cross in gold (February 1945)
- War Merit Cross 1st and 2nd class with Swords

== Sources ==
- Caroli, Paolo (2022). Transitional Justice in Italy and the Crimes of Fascism and Nazism. Routledge Research in Legal History. ISBN 978-1-000-59333-4.
- Schiffer Publishing Ltd., ed. (2000). SS Officers List: SS-Standartenführer to SS-Oberstgruppenführer (As of 30 January 1942). Schiffer Military History Publishing. ISBN 0-7643-1061-5.
- Scomazzon, Francesco (2021). The Alps and Resistance (1943-1945): Conflicts, Violence and Political Reflections. Cambridge Scholars Publishing. ISBN 978-1-527-57486-1.
- Yerger, Mark C. (1997). Allgemeine-SS: The Commands, Units and Leaders of the General SS. Schiffer Publishing Ltd. ISBN 0-7643-0145-4.
