= Theobald Thier =

SS and Police Leader and SS-Brigadeführer

- Born: 12 April 1897; Stuttgart, Kingdom of Württemberg, German Empire
- Died: 12 July 1949 (aged 52); Kraków, Poland
- Cause of death: Execution by hanging
- Military career
- Allegiance: German Empire; Nazi Germany
- Branch: Imperial German Army; Schutzstaffel
- Service years: 1915–1918; 1935–1945
- Rank: Leutnant; SS-Brigadeführer and Generalmajor of police
- Commands: SS and Police Leader, "Kuban," "Kerch," "Lemberg," "Kraków"
- Conflicts: World War I World War II
- Awards: Iron Cross, 1st and 2nd class War Merit Cross, 1st and 2nd class with Swords

Theobald Thier (12 April 1897 – 12 July 1949) was a German SS-Brigadeführer and Generalmajor of police who served as an SS and police leader (SSPF) in southern Russia and the General Government. After the end of the Second World War, he was convicted of war crimes, sentenced to death, and executed.

== Early life ==
Thier, son of a merchant, was born in Stuttgart and was educated through secondary school. He then entered the Imperial German Army and took part as a soldier in the First World War, serving as an artillery officer. He attained the rank of Leutnant, was wounded and was awarded the Iron Cross, 1st and 2nd class. After the war, he was a member of the Freikorps. He then trained as a farmer and became a landowner.

Thier became a member of the Nazi Party in 1923 (membership number 1,744,848). On 9 November of that year he took part in Adolf Hitler's unsuccessful Beer Hall Putsch in Munich. Leaving the Party in 1926, he emigrated abroad, living as a farmer and estate manager in Chile. In early May 1933, while still in Chile, he rejoined the Party's foreign organization.

== SS peacetime career ==
Returning to Germany at the beginning of 1935, Thier joined the SS (membership number 250,198). From June to August 1935 he was adjutant to Hans-Adolf Prützmann, the commander of the SS-Oberabschnitt (Main District) "Southwest," based in Stuttgart. He then led the 1st Sturmbann (battalion) of the 13th SS-Standarte in Stuttgart from March 1936 until May 1937. From May 1937 to May 1939 he was commander of the 55th SS-Standarte "Weser" in Minden. In November 1938, he also assumed the leadership of SS-Abschnitt (District) XVII in Münster, holding this post until August 1939. He also simultaneously commanded SS-Abschnitt XV, headquartered in Altona, from May until October 1939.

== Second World War ==
After the outbreak of the Second World War, Thier served as Chief of Staff to the Higher SS and Police Leader (HSSPF) in Danzig-West Prussia from October 1939 to June 1941. He also took over as Chief of Staff to the SS-Oberabschnitt "Vistula" from November 1940 to November 1942. From June to the end of November 1941 he served on the special task force under Paul Wegener in Norway, advising and directing the Quisling government. Beginning in December 1941 he worked for a few months in the Reich Security Main Office (RSHA) in Berlin. From April 1942 he was attached to the HSSPF "East" in the General Government.

Thier was appointed the SS and Police Leader (SSPF) "Kaukasien-Kuban" in southern Russia between August 1942 to November 1942, under his former patron, Prützmann. After brief assignments in Leipzig and Danzig for a few months, he returned to southern Russia as the SSPF "Kerch-Taman Peninsula" from early May through July 1943. He returned to the General Government as the SSPF "Lemburg" from July 1943 to February 1944. During this time, as the Nazis continued to be pushed back by the Red Army on the eastern front, Thier was involved in implementing the Enterdungsaktion (Exhumation Action) in which Nazi police and Security Service officers sought to obliterate the evidence of their genocide by exhuming mass graves and destroying the corpses. He also was involved in the liquidation of the Janowska concentration camp in November 1943, which ended with the killing of an estimated 6,000 Jewish prisoners. On 1 March 1944, he transferred to the position of the SSPF "Kraków," remaining there until the fall of the city in January 1945. After the end of the war, Thier was arrested on 22 July 1945 and extradited to Poland to stand trial for war crimes. He was sentenced to death in Kraków on 10 December 1948, and executed in July 1949.

== SS and police ranks ==
Date	Rank
May 1935	SS-Obersturmführer
April 1936	SS-Hauptsturmführer
May 1937	SS-Sturmbannführer
April 1938	SS-Obersturmbannführer
November 1938	SS-Standartenführer
November 1940	SS-Oberführer
November 1942	SS-Brigadeführer and Generalmajor of police

== Sources ==
- Klee, Ernst (2007). Das Personenlexikon zum Dritten Reich. Wer war was vor und nach 1945. Frankfurt-am-Main: Fischer-Taschenbuch-Verlag. ISBN 978-3-596-16048-8.
- Schiffer Publishing Ltd. (2000). SS Officers List: SS-Standartenführer to SS-Oberstgruppenführer (As of 30 January 1942). Schiffer Military History Publishing. ISBN 0-7643-1061-5.
- Yerger, Mark C. (1997). Allgemeine-SS: The Commands, Units and Leaders of the General SS. Vol. 1 Augsberger to Kteutz. Schiffer Publishing Ltd. ISBN 0-7643-0145-4.
