= Wilhelm Traub =

German Nazi SS-Obersturmbannführer (1910–1946)

- Born: 2 April 1910; Buoch (today, Remshalden), Kingdom of Württemberg, German Empire
- Died: 18 February 1946 (age 35); Vrbas, Yugoslavia
- Military career
- Allegiance: Nazi Germany
- Branch: Schutzstaffel
- Service years: 1938–1945
- Rank: SS-Obersturmbannführer
- Commands: Gebietskommissar, "Navahrudak"; SS and Police Leader, "Quarnero"
- Conflicts: World War II

Wilhelm Traub (2 April 1910 – 18 February 1946) was a German Nazi SS-Obersturmbannführer who, during the Second World War, served as the occupation administrator of the Navahrudak (today, Novogrudok) area of the Generalbezirk Weißruthenien, and as the SS and Police Leader of "Quarnero" (Kvarner Gulf) based in Fiume (today, Rijeka). After the war ended, he died in captivity in Yugoslavia in 1946.

== Life ==
Few details are known about Traub's early life. He attended university, joined the Nazi Party (membership number 4,355,116) and the SS (member number 290,239) and was commissioned an SS-Untersturmführer in 1938. After the German invasion of the Soviet Union, now a member of the Sicherheitsdienst (SD) with the rank of SS-Sturmbannführer, he was made the Gebietskommissar (Area Commissioner) of the Kreisgebiet "Navahrudak", a subdivision of the Generalbezirk Weißruthenien. He reported to the Generalkommissar, SS-Gruppenführer Curt von Gottberg, whose headquarters were in Minsk.

Traub was charged with creating a local mounted anti-partisan unit under the direction of the SS that would be raised from among the local Belarusian collaborators. In early autumn 1943, Traub summoned Boris Ragula, his twenty-three-year-old Belarusian translator and liaison officer. Traub outlined a plan for organizing a cavalry unit of 150 men under Ragula’s command that would operate directly under the German authorities. Ragula would go on to help organize and lead the Belarusian Home Defence force in early 1944. Following steady German reversals in Russia, Navahrudak fell to the Red Army on 8 July 1944.

Now an SS-Obersturmbannführer, Traub subsequently was transferred to northern Italy, reporting to the Higher SS and Police Leader (HSSPF) of the Operational Zone of the Adriatic Littoral, SS-Gruppenführer Odilo Globočnik. There on 27 October 1944, Traub was made SS and Polizeigebietkommandeur (Police Area Commander) of "Quarnero," with his headquarters in Fiume. Here also, he mainly was engaged anti-partisan warfare against the Slovene partisans. Fiume fell to the partisans on 2 May 1945 and, after the end of the war in Europe, Traub was imprisoned in Yugoslavia and died in a prisoner of war camp in Vrbas in February 1946.

== See also ==
- Nowogródek – The Story of a Shtetl in Yad Vashem
