= Karl-Heinz Bürger =

German SS functionary (1904–1988)

Karl-Heinz Bürger (16 February 1904 – 2 December 1988) was a German SS functionary who held positions as SS and Police Leader during the Nazi era.

== Career ==
Bürger became a member of the brownshirt SA in June 1923, taking part in the Beer Hall Putsch in November of the same year. In 1924 and 1925 he studied at the University of Potsdam. In 1927, Bürger became a member of the Nazi Party and in 1933 moved from the SA to the SS.

At the end of August 1942, Bürger was appointed SS and Police Leader for the North Caucasus region, later becoming the Polizeiführer for Volhynia and central Italy, where he held a number of positions. On 13 May 1945, he was arrested in Bolzano.

Bürger died in December 1988 in Karlsbad.
