= Hans Haltermann =

SS and Police Leader and SS-Gruppenführer

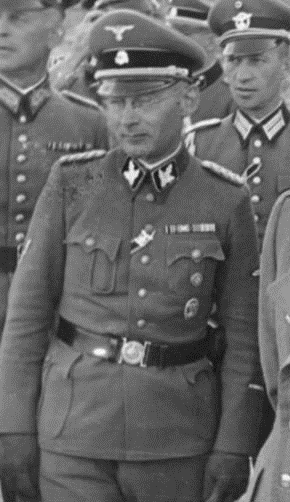
- Haltermann in June 1942
- Born: 20 April 1898; Berlin, Kingdom of Prussia, German Empire
- Died: 17 June 1981 (age 83); Paderborn, West Germany
- Military career
- Allegiance: German Empire; Nazi Germany
- Branch: Imperial German Army; Schutzstaffel
- Service years: 1914–1919; 1936–1945
- Rank: SS-Gruppenführer and Generalleutnant of Police
- Commands: SS and Police Leader, "Kiev;" "Charkov;" "Mogilew"
- Conflicts: World War I World War II
- Awards: Iron Cross, 1st and 2nd class War Merit Cross, 1st and 2nd class with Swords

Hans Haltermann (20 April 1898 – 17 June 1981) was a German engineer, Nazi Party politician and SS officer. As an SS-Gruppenführer and Generalleutnant of Police, he served as an SS and Police Leader in occupied Ukraine and Byelorussia.

== Early life ==
Haltermann was born in Berlin, the second child of a Reichsbank official. He attended a realgymnasium in Berlin-Lankwitz until August 1914 and, upon the outbreak of the First World War, left school to join the 2nd Guards Field Artillery of the Imperial German Army as a one-year volunteer. He served on the western front throughout the war, earned the Iron Cross 2nd class, and was discharged from army service on 31 March 1919. After completing his secondary education, he studied engineering at the Technische Hochschule in Berlin (now Technische Universität Berlin) from 1920 to 1925. He became an electrical engineer in Berlin and from 1927 to 1933 he was a manager in an electrical company in Bremen.

== SA and SS peacetime career ==
Drawn to right-wing politics, Haltermann fought in 1919 against the Spartacist uprising in Berlin. He was also a participant in the unsuccessful Kapp Putsch that attempted to overthrow the Weimar Republic. In 1924 he became a member of the Frontbann, a paramilitary front organization set up during the period when the Nazi Party was outlawed. After the ban was lifted, Haltermann on 25 September 1926 became a member of the Nazi Party (membership number 44,393) and its restored paramilitary branch, the Sturmabteilung (SA). He first commanded an SA company in Steglitz as an SA-Sturmführer in SA-Standarte II (Berlin-Brandenburg). Then, as an SA-Standartenführer, he headed the SA in Bremen from 1927 to 1930.

In November 1930, Haltermann was elected as a Nazi member of the Bürgerschaft of Bremen. After the Nazi seizure of power in 1933, he joined the Bremen state government as the Senator for Labor and Welfare on 18 March 1933, retaining this office until 1942. On 19 April 1936, he switched from the SA to the SS (membership number 276,294) entering with the rank of SS-Standartenführer. He served on the staff of SS-Abschnitt (District) XIV, headquartered in Bremen. He was promoted to SS-Oberführer on 30 January 1939 and SS-Brigadeführer on 20 April 1940.

== Second World War ==
On the outbreak of the Second World War, Haltermann joined the German Army as a Leutnant in the reserves. He fought in the Polish campaign, was promoted to Oberleutnant in January 1940 and participated in the Battle of France. Following the invasion of Yugoslavia, he served with the army command in Belgrade until June 1941, and then participated in the German invasion of the Soviet Union. He was returned to SS and police duties at the request of Reichsführer-SS Heinrich Himmler in August 1941, and was appointed the first SS and Police Leader (SSPF) of Kiev on 1 October 1941. During his tenure in Kiev, Einsatzgruppe C was active in perpetrating mass murder of Jews and other Ukrainians. Haltermann was subsequently named as a war criminal by a Soviet special commission set up to investigate German crimes and atrocities in Kiev.

Promoted on 30 January 1943 to SS-Gruppenführer and Generalleutnant of Police, he was transferred to become SSPF in Charkow on 19 May 1943, succeeding Willy Tensfeld. He served there until September 1943 when he replaced Franz Kutschera as SSPF of Mogilew in Byelorussia. He was the last holder of this post, as it was abolished 12 July 1944 following the Mogilev offensive in which the Red Army succeeded in expelling the occupying German forces. From July 1944 to 9 January 1945, Haltermann served as the Deputy Higher SS and Police Leader (HSSPF) "Nordost" based in Konigsberg, deputizing for the incumbent, Hans-Adolf Prutzmann. He was then briefly posted to the SS Personnel Main Office, and from mid-March 1945 to the end of the war he worked in the office of the Police President of Bremen.

At the end of the war, he was taken prisoner by the British, and was interned until 1949. In the denazification process he was classified as Category II, "offender" but he was never brought to trial. He died in Paderborn in 1981.

SS and Police Ranks
Date	Rank
April 1936	SS-Standartenführer
January 1939	SS-Oberführer
April 1940	SS-Brigadeführer
January 1942	Generalmajor of Police
January 1943	SS-Gruppenführer and Generalleutnant of Police

== Awards ==
- Iron Cross (1914) 2nd class
- Clasp to the Iron Cross 2nd class
- Iron Cross (1939) 1st class
- War Merit Cross 1st and 2nd class with Swords
- Golden Party Badge of the NSDAP

== See also ==
- Holocaust in Ukraine
- Holocaust in Belarus

== Sources ==
- Klee, Ernst (2007). Das Personenlexikon zum Dritten Reich. Wer war was vor und nach 1945. Frankfurt-am-Main: Fischer-Taschenbuch-Verlag. ISBN 978-3-596-16048-8.
- Yerger, Mark C. (1997). Allgemeine-SS: The Commands, Units and Leaders of the General SS. Schiffer Publishing Ltd. ISBN 0-7643-0145-4.
