= Wilhelm Günther =

SS and Police Leader and SS-Brigadeführer

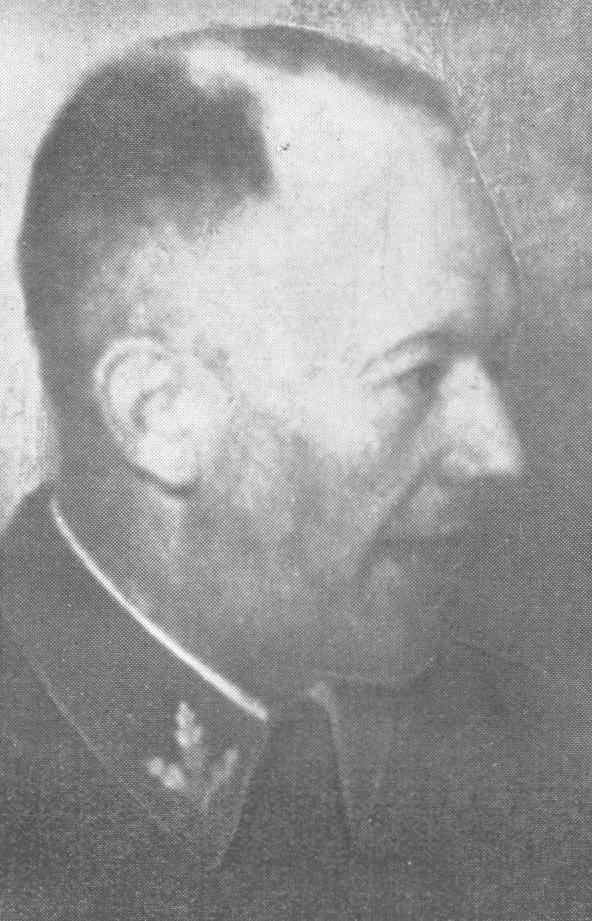
- Born: 21 April 1899; Ermenrod, Grand Duchy of Hesse, German Empire
- Died: (declared dead) 1945 (age 46); Allied-occupied Germany
- Military career
- Allegiance: German Empire; Weimar Republic; Nazi Germany
- Branch: Imperial German Army; Reichswehr; Schutzstaffel
- Service years: 1915-1919; 1932-1945
- Rank: SS-Brigadeführer and Generalmajor of Police
- Commands: SS and Police Leader, "Bergvölker-Ordshonikidse;" "Wolhynien-Luzk"; Commander of SiPo and SD, "Trieste"
- Conflicts: World War I World War II
- Awards: Iron Cross, 1st and 2nd class War Merit Cross, 1st and 2nd class with Swords

Wilhelm Günther (21 April 1899 - 1945) was a German SS-Brigadeführer and Generalmajor of Police who served as an SS and Police Leader (SSPF) in the occupied Soviet Union, and as the commander of security police (SiPo) and intelligence forces (SD) in Trieste during Second World War. He was declared dead after the end of the war.

== Early life and career ==
Günther was born in Ermenrod and served as a soldier with a signals unit in the Imperial German Army during the First World War. After the end of the war, he served for a short time in the Reichswehr under the Weimar Republic until being discharged October 1919. He then studied electrical engineering. Active in the opposition to the Occupation of the Ruhr, he was briefly imprisoned for espionage activities by a French military court.

In May 1932 Günther joined the Nazi Party (membership number 1,094,209) and on 14 March 1933, the SS (SS number 69,638). From March 1933 to April 1935 he worked as a signals specialist in SS-Abschnitt (District) XI, based in Wiesbaden. Assigned to the Sicherheitsdienst (SD), the SS intelligence service, he was posted to SS-Oberabschnitt (Main District) "Rhine," also headquartered in Wiesbaden, until April 1937. This was followed by a tour as the Commander of the SD in the Oberabschnitt "Südost" based in Breslau until November 1938. During this time he was active in the occupation of the Sudetenland. From October 1939 to March 1941 he was Inspekteur der Sicherheitspolizei und des SD (Inspector of SiPo and SD) in Stettin and then in Kassel until September 1942.

== Wartime service ==
In the Second World War, following the German summer offensive aimed at the Caucasus, Günther was appointed, from 7 May to 23 August 1942, to be the SS and Police Leader (SSPF) "Bergvölker-Ordshonikidse," the only holder of this short-lived command. He was then transferred to become the SSPF "Wolhynien-Luzk" in western Ukraine from 1 September 1942 until June 1944 when he was succeeded by SS-Brigadeführer Ernst Hartmann. He left the eastern front in May 1944 to serve as the Befehlshaber der Sicherheitspolizei und des SD (Commander of SiPo and SD) in Trieste, located in the Operational Zone of the Adriatic Littoral.

In Italy, Günther reported to SS-Gruppenführer Wilhelm Harster, and his organization's chief responsibilities were combating partisan operations and carrying out anti-Jewish persecutions and deportations. Trieste was the site of the infamous Risiera di San Sabba concentration camp. Günther remained in Italy until mid-February 1945, and then served in a staff position in the Reich Security Main Office (RSHA) in Berlin until the end of the war.

Little is known of Günther's ultimate fate, and he was declared dead after the end of the war.

SS and police ranks
Date	Rank
April 1935	SS-Untersturmführer
January 1936	SS-Obersturmführer
April 1937	SS-Hauptsturmführer
January 1938	SS-Sturmbannführer
September 1938	SS-Obersturmbannführer
September 1939	SS-Standartenführer
November 1941	SS-Oberführer
April 1943	SS-Brigadeführer and Generalmajor of Police

== Awards ==
- Iron Cross (1914) 2nd class
- Wound Badge (1918)
- Clasp to the Iron Cross 2nd Class
- Iron Cross (1939) 1st class
- War Merit Cross (1939) 1st and 2nd class with Swords

== See also ==
- Holocaust in Italy
- Holocaust in Ukraine

== Sources ==
- Klee, Ernst (2007). Das Personenlexikon zum Dritten Reich. Wer war was vor und nach 1945. Frankfurt-am-Main: Fischer-Taschenbuch-Verlag. ISBN 978-3-596-16048-8.
- Schiffer Publishing Ltd., ed. (2000). SS Officers List: SS-Standartenführer to SS-Oberstgruppenführer (As of 30 January 1942). Schiffer Military History Publishing. ISBN 0-7643-1061-5.
- Yerger, Mark C. (1997). Allgemeine-SS: The Commands, Units and Leaders of the General SS. Schiffer Publishing Ltd. ISBN 0-7643-0145-4.
