= Paul Hennicke =

SS and Police Leader and SS-Gruppenführer

- Born: 31 January 1883; Erfurt, Kingdom of Prussia, German Empire
- Died: 25 July 1967 (age 84); Braunschweig, West Germany
- Military career
- Allegiance: German Empire; Nazi Germany
- Branch: Imperial German Army; Schutzstaffel
- Service years: 1906-1907; 1914-1919; 1929-1945
- Rank: SS-Gruppenführer and Generalleutnant of Police
- Commands: SS and Police Leader, "Rostow-Awdejewka;" "Kiew"
- Conflicts: World War I World War II
- Awards: Iron Cross, 1st and 2nd class Clasp to the Iron Cross, 2nd class War Merit Cross, 1st and 2nd class with Swords

Paul August Ernst Hennicke (31 January 1883 – 25 July 1967) was a German Nazi Party politician, SS-Gruppenführer and Generalleutnant of Police. He served as an SS and Police Leader in the occupied Soviet Union during the Second World War.

== Early life ==
Hennicke was born the son of an innkeeper in Erfurt and attended public school there through secondary vocational school, and then mechanical engineering schools in Dortmund and Einbeck. He fulfilled his military obligation as a one-year volunteer in 1906–1907 with Infantry Regiment 71. He then became a locksmith and engineer, and was employed by the Deutsche Reichsbahn at the railway repair shop in Gotha. When the First World War broke out, he enlisted and worked as a railway official for the Imperial German Army. He then transferred to Infantry Regiment 371 in 1915, and was commissioned a Leutnant in 1916. He transferred to the intelligence service in 1917, and earned the Iron Cross 1st and 2nd class. After discharge from military service, he joined the Erfurt Freikorps in 1920, and then resumed work for the railroad as an inspector at the Erfurt locomotive works until 1933.

== Nazi Party political career ==
Hennicke met Adolf Hitler in April 1922 and joined the Nazi Party that month (membership number 36,492). As an early party member, he was a recipient of the Golden Party Badge. In 1925 he became a member of the Landtag of Thuringia and in 1927 he was elected as a City Councilor in Gotha. In 1933 after the Nazi seizure of power, he was named as a Thuringian Staatsrat (State Councilor). In November 1933, he was elected to the Reichstag from electoral constituency 12, (Thuringia), and would hold that seat until the fall of the Nazi regime.

Hennicke joined the SS on 24 February 1929 with the rank of SS-Sturmbannführer (membership number 1,332). He served with the 8th SS-Standarte, based in Hirschberg. On 15 April 1931, he was promoted to SS-Standartenführer and became the first commander of the newly formed 14th SS-Standarte in Gotha. This was followed on 15 November 1933 by his becoming the first commander of SS-Abschnitt (District) XXVII, headquartered in Gotha (in Weimar after April 1938). During this time, he advanced steadily through the ranks, being promoted to SS-Oberführer on 9 November 1933, SS-Brigadeführer 20 April 1934 and SS-Gruppenführer on 30 January 1938. On 25 March 1938 he was named Police President of Weimar and would remain the chief of police in that city for four-and-a-half years.

== Second World War ==
Following the German invasion of the Soviet Union, Hennicke left his position in Weimar. He was promoted to Generalleutnant of Police on 16 September 1942 and became the SS and Police Leader "Rostow-Awdejewka" on 1 October 1942. After German military reverses following the Battle of Stalingrad, Rostow fell to the Red Army in mid-February 1943, but Hennicke nominally remained in his post until it was formally abolished on 1 May 1943. He then was named SSPF "Kiew," becoming the last holder of this post, leaving in December 1943 following the fall of the city to the Soviet forces.

Hennicke was then transferred to the office of Supreme SS and Police Leader "Ukraine," SS-Obergruppenführer Hans-Adolf Prützmann, as an SSPF for Special Assignments. Also in 1943, he received a gift of 150,000 ℛ︁ℳ︁ from Hitler. In June 1944 he moved to a staff position in the SS Main Office under SS-Obergruppenführer Gottlob Berger, and in January 1945 he was made Inspector of Volkssturm "Mitte" in central Germany, remaining in this post through the end of the war in Europe on 8 May 1945. During the war, he was awarded the Clasp to the Iron Cross, 2nd class, and the War Merit Cross, 1st and 2nd class with Swords. Hennicke surrendered to the US Army in Gotha on 1 June 1945. He was interned, brought to trial in 1949 and acquitted. Hennicke lived as a pensioner and died in Braunschweig in July 1967.

== Sources ==
- Klee, Ernst (2007). Das Personenlexikon zum Dritten Reich. Wer war was vor und nach 1945. Frankfurt-am-Main: Fischer-Taschenbuch-Verlag. ISBN 978-3-596-16048-8.
- Schiffer Publishing Ltd., ed. (2000). SS Officers List: SS-Standartenführer to SS-Oberstgruppenführer (As of 30 January 1942). Schiffer Military History Publishing. ISBN 0-7643-1061-5.
- Yerger, Mark C. (1997). Allgemeine-SS: The Commands, Units and Leaders of the General SS. Schiffer Publishing Ltd. ISBN 0-7643-0145-4.
