= Walter Schimana =

Austrian Nazi SS general and war criminal

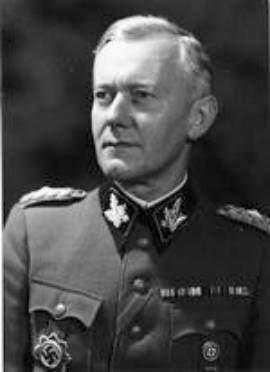
- Schimana, c. 1944–1945
- Born: 12 March 1898; Troppau, Austria-Hungary
- Died: 12 September 1948 (aged 50); Salzburg, Allied-occupied Austria
- Cause of death: Suicide
- Military career
- Allegiance: Austria-Hungary; Nazi Germany
- Branch: Imperial-Royal Landwehr; Freikorps; Waffen-SS
- Service years: 1918–1920; 1939–1945
- Rank: Leutnant; SS-Gruppenführer and Generalleutnant of the Police and of the Waffen-SS
- Commands: SS and Police Leader (SSPF), Central Russia and Belarus; Higher SS and Police Leader, Greece
- Awards: German Cross in Gold; Iron Cross, 1st and 2nd class

Walter Schimana (12 March 1898 – 12 September 1948) was an Austrian Nazi and a general in the SS during the Nazi era. He was SS and Police Leader in the occupied Soviet Union in 1942 and Higher SS and Police Leader in occupied Greece from October 1943. Responsible for numerous war crimes and atrocities in the occupied territories, Schimana was arrested by the Allies after the war and died by suicide while awaiting trial.

== Life ==
Schimana was born in Austrian Silesia, the son of a publisher of a pro-German newspaper. In 1915, after attending school, he went to a cadet school in Prague. He then transferred to the Theresian Military Academy in Wiener-Neustadt, graduating in December 1918. He was assigned to Schützenregiment Nr. 1., a unit of the Imperial-Royal Landwehr. Moving to Bavaria, he joined the 3rd Battalion of the 2nd Bayerisches Reichswehr-Infanterie-Regiment 44 in Passau on 1 June 1919, and was promoted to Fähnrich der Reserve (cadet officer of the reserves) on 15 July 1919.

On 2 September 1919, Schimana joined the Freikorps in the Baltic and served with the Iron Division (Eiserne Division) which, only shortly later, joined the West Russian Volunteer Army. In mid-December 1919, the German troops were evacuated to East Prussia and Schimana was released from service on 20 April 1920 as a Leutnant of reserves. He attended a business school from 1921 to 1922, then worked as a bookkeeper at a bank and as a commercial businessman.

=== SA, police and SS career ===
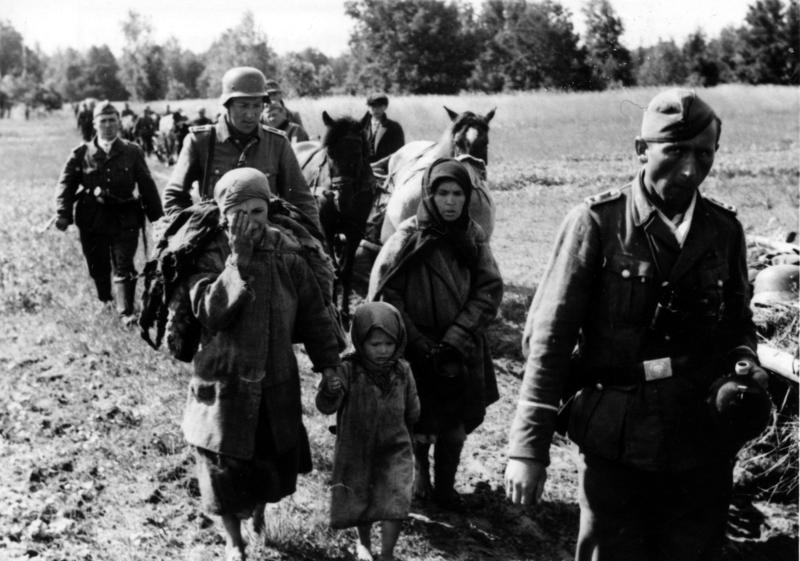
Battle group "Schimana" in the Soviet Union, with noncombatant women and child.

Schimana joined the Nazi Party (NSDAP) on 7 December 1926 (membership number 49,042) in Munich. As an early Party member, he later would be awarded the Golden Party Badge. He also became a member of the paramilitary Sturmabteilung (SA) unit in Munich. Commissioned as an SA-Sturmführer on 22 November 1930, he rose through the ranks and eventually became an SA-Standartenführer in 1938. He was on the staff of SA-Gruppe Donau from March 1934 to July 1939 as a special duties officer. He was the commander of the SA-Feldgendarmerie in Waldenburg from March 1934 to April 1935. That month, he joined the uniformed Protection Police (Schutzpolizei) with the rank of Hauptmann. In April 1936, Schimana was transferred to the Gendarmerie as a Major. From then until April 1938, he was on the staff of the chief of the Ordnungspolizei. After the Anschluss with Austria, he was assigned to the staff of the police president of Vienna as commander of the motorized Gendarmerie for Austria. On 15 August 1939, he left the SA and transferred to the SS with the rank of SS-Standartenführer.

=== World War II and atrocities ===
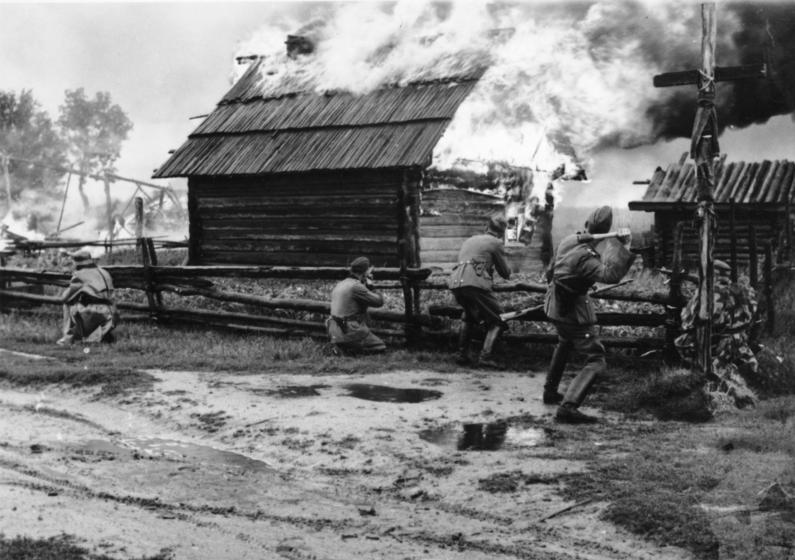
Members of an Order Police unit under Schimana's command attacking a village in the Soviet Union, 1942.

At the outbreak of the war in Europe, Schimana took over command of a Feldgendarmerie battalion in Poland, France then the General Government up to 1940. He also served as the commandant of the Gendarmerie school in Suhl until November 1940, and the motorized Gendarmerie school in Deggingen until September 1941.

On 4 September 1941, Schimana was appointed SS and Police Leader (SSPF) for the Saratov area, and later attached to the staff of the Higher SS and Police Leader (HSSPF) for Central Russia until July 1942, taking part in rear-security operations. From 21 July 1942 to 15 July 1943, he was SSPF of Belarus, with headquarters at Minsk. Reporting to Friedrich Jeckeln, he was responsible for the formation of the Schutzmannschaft (collaborationist police) battalions. Subsequently, he underwent training as a divisional commander and served as the first commander of the newly formed SS Division Galicia from July to October 1943.

On 18 October, Schimana was appointed HSSPF for Greece, in place of Jürgen Stroop, a position he held until the withdrawal of German forces from the country in September–October 1944. On 20 April 1944, he was promoted to SS-Gruppenführer and, on 20 June 1944, to Generalleutnant der Waffen-SS und Polizei (Lieutenant General of the Waffen-SS and police).

Schimana became actively engaged in carrying out the persecution of Greek Jews and the campaign against the Greek Resistance movement. In this capacity, he was instrumental in the formation of the infamous "Security Battalions". After the German withdrawal, in October 1944 he was appointed HSSPF of the SS-Oberabschnitt Donau (Main District Danube), which had its headquarters in Vienna. He remained in that position until the German surrender.

== Arrest and suicide ==
After Germany's capitulation, Schimana was taken into custody by American forces. Before he was brought to trial, he hanged himself in his prison cell.

== Dates of rank ==
Dates of SA, SS and police ranks
Date	Rank
22 November 1930	SA-Sturmführer
10 August 1933	SA-Sturmbannführer
31 March 1935	SA-Obersturmbannführer
1938	SA-Standartenführer
15 August 1939	SS-Standartenführer
November 1940	Oberstleutnant der Polizei
9 December 1941	Oberst der Polizei
1 July 1942	SS-Oberführer
9 November 1942	SS-Brigadeführer und Generalmajor der Polizei
14 July 1943	SS-Brigadeführer und Generalmajor der Waffen-SS
20 April 1944	SS-Gruppenführer und Generalleutnant der Waffen-SS und Polizei

== Selected awards and decorations ==
The following are among Schimana's most prominent awards and decorations.

- German Cross in Gold (7 August 1943)
- Iron Cross (1939), Second & First Class
- War Merit Cross, 2nd Class with Swords
- Golden Party Badge
- SA Sports Badge in Gold
- Deutsches Reichssportabzeichen in Gold

== See also ==
- Bandenbekämpfung

== Sources ==
- Klee, Ernst (2007). Das Personenlexikon zum Dritten Reich. Wer war was vor und nach 1945. Frankfurt-am-Main: Fischer-Taschenbuch-Verlag. ISBN 978-3-596-16048-8.
- Yerger, Mark C. (1997). The Allgemeine-SS: The Commands, Units and Leaders of the General SS. Schiffer Publishing Ltd. ISBN 0-7643-0145-4.
- Yerger, Mark C. (1999). The Waffen-SS Commanders: The Army, Corps and Divisional Leaders of a Legend. Vol. 2 Krüger to Zimmermann. Schiffer Military History. ISBN 978-0-764-30769-0.
