= Benno Martin =

German Nazi Gestapo chief (1893–1975)

Personal details
- Born: 12 February 1893
- Died: 2 July 1975 (aged 82)

Military service
- Allegiance: Nazi Germany
- Branch/service: Schutzstaffel
- Years of service: 1914 – 1945
- Rank: SS-Obergruppenführer

Benno Martin (12 February 1893 – 2 July 1975) was a German SS functionary during the Nazi era. He served as Gestapo chief and Higher SS and Police Leader in Nuremberg. Martin was a member of the Nazi Party, joining in 1933.

== Career ==
Martin fought in the German Imperial Army in the First World War in which he was awarded Iron Cross first and second class. After Germany's defeat, he joined the paramilitary Freikorps in 1919. He obtained his Juris Doctor after the war ended and then joined the police department in Nuremberg in 1923, rising through the ranks to chief of police in Nuremberg. After World War II ended in Europe, he was indicted and tried for complicity in the deportation of Franconia Jews to Auschwitz. Martin was acquitted of the charges.
