= Waldemar Wappenhans =

German Nazi SS and police leader (1893–1967)

- Born: 21 October 1893; Berlin, Kingdom of Prussia, German Empire
- Died: 2 December 1967 (age 74); Hanover, West Germany
- Education: University of Breslau
- Military career
- Allegiance: German Empire; Weimar Republic; Nazi Germany
- Branch: Imperial German Army; Imperial German Air Force; Reichswehr; Schutzstaffel; Luftwaffe
- Service years: 1914–1923; 1931–1945
- Rank: Oberleutnant; SS-Gruppenführer and Generalleutnant of police Major (Luftwaffe)
- Commands: SS and Police Leader, "Wolhynien-Brest-Litovsk;" "Nicolajew;" "Dnjepropetrowsk-Krivoi Rog"
- Conflicts: World War I World War II
- Awards: Clasp to the Iron Cross, 1st and 2nd class War Merit Cross, 1st and 2nd class with swords

Waldemar Wappenhans (21 October 1893 – 2 December 1967) was a German military officer who served as an air force pilot in World War I. He joined the Nazi Party and the Schutzstaffel (SS) in 1931, rising to the rank of SS-Gruppenführer and Generalleutnant of police. He served as an SS and police leader (SSPF) in the Reichskommissariat Ukraine during World War II, where atrocities were carried out against the Jewish population. Evading capture after the war, he lived under a false name until 1949 when his true identity was discovered. He underwent denazification procedures but never faced criminal prosecution.

== Early life ==
Wappenhans was born in Berlin the son of a professor, attended a cadet school in Karlsruhe from 1902 and then the Prussian Military Academy in Lichterfelde. In July 1914, he was commissioned a Leutnant in the Imperial German Army.

At the outbreak of the First World War, Wappenhans was a member of the 113th Infantry Regiment and from September 1914 he became a battalion adjutant in the 239th Infantry Regiment. He was wounded, and after release from the hospital, he transferred to the Imperial German Air Force. He qualified as a pilot, served in Flying Detachments 300 and 305 and was awarded the Iron Cross, 1st and 2nd class. After the end of the war, Wappenhans was employed by the border service in Silesia and left the army in 1923 with the rank of Oberleutnant. He attended the University of Breslau and then worked for a cigarette company, becoming a branch manager in Danzig. In 1930, through Werner Lorenz, Wappenhans became acquainted with Reichsführer-SS Heinrich Himmler. He subsequently joined the Nazi Party (membership number 465,090) and the SS (membership number 22,924) on 1 February 1931.

== SS peacetime career ==
Wappenhans was then assigned to SS-Abschnitt (District) VII in Danzig, and became its chief of staff from February to September 1932. From September 1932 to April 1933, he was commander of the 19th SS-Standarte "Westphalia-North" based in Münster. After the Nazi seizure of power, he was elected to the Prussian Landtag in March 1933, where he served until its dissolution. From April to December 1933, he was commander of the 55th SS-Standarte "Weser" in Nieburg, and from then until the end of October 1934, commander of the 24th SS-Standarte "Ostfriesland" in Oldenburg. This was followed by a posting as a special duty officer in the SS-Oberabschnitt (Main District) "Nordost" in Königsberg. In April 1935, he became commander of SS-Abschnitt IX in Würzburg. Leaving this post in April 1938, he commanded SS-Abschnitt XVII in Augsburg until May 1938. He was then made chief of staff for SS-Oberabschnitt "Nord" in Stettin until November 1938, before taking command of SS-Abschnitt XXXIII in Schwerin until September 1941.

== Second World War ==
In January 1936, Wappenhans had entered the Luftwaffe as a Leutnant of the reserves. He would serve with aerial reconnaissance units until December 1940, leaving the service as a Major of reserves. He completed police training courses at Ordnungspolizei headquarters in Berlin, where he worked until September 1941. Following the German invasion of the Soviet Union, he held a number of SS and Police Leader (SSPF) posts in the Reichskommissariat Ukraine (RKU). In these posts, he commanded all German uniformed police, as well as all SS and Sicherheitsdienst (SD) forces in his jurisdictions. From September 1941 through August 1942, he was the SSPF in Wolhynien-Brest-Litovsk, adding in January 1942 Rovno to his jurisdiction. From August 1942 until April 1943, he was the SSPF in Nikolayev, and also from October 1942 to October 1943, SSPF in Dnjepropetrowsk-Krivoi Rog. Throughout Wappenhans' tenure in the RKU, SS and Order Police battalions together with Einsatzgruppen personnel were engaged in mass murder of the Jewish population.

From October 1943, Wappenhans was an SSPF for special assignment to the Supreme SS and Police Leader (HöSSPF) "Ukraine", Hans-Adolf Prützmann, and was commander of a Kampfgruppe (battle group) until January 1944. After that, he was placed on medical leave due to illness. In January 1945, Wappenhans was transferred to the staff of Generalfeldmarschall Walter Model on the western front. Towards the very end of the war, he received orders to report to Berlin but, unable to reach the encircled city, instead made his way to Hahnenklee, where his family lived.

== Post-war life ==
Wappenhaus went underground under the false name "Hans Seemann", working as a farm hand, and then as a property management administrator for the British occupation authorities in Hanover. At the time, Wappenhans was reported to be the fourth highest Nazi on the Allies "most-wanted" list. In November 1949, his true identity was discovered by Wolfe Frank, a reporter for the New York Herald Tribune who had served as the chief interpreter at the Nuremberg trials. He was interrogated and signed a statement, but denied all involvement in criminal acts. He underwent a denazification process in Bielefeld but was not brought to criminal trial. He then worked for Heimbs Kaffee, a coffee roasting company in Braunschweig, and died in Hanover in December 1967.

== Military, SS and police ranks ==
Wappenhan's military and SS ranks
Date	Rank
July 1914	Leutnant
1923	Oberleutnant
July 1932	SS-Sturmbannführer
December 1932	SS-Standartenführer
November 1934	SS-Oberführer
January 1936	Leutnant of reserves
May 1937	Hauptmann of reserves
October 1940	Major of reserves
September 1941	SS-Brigadeführer and Generalmajor of police
November 1943	SS-Gruppenführer and Generalleutnant of police

== Awards and decorations ==
- Knight's Cross of the House Order of Hohenzollern with swords
- Iron Cross (1914) 2nd and 1st class
- Wound Badge (1918) in silver
- Prussian Military Pilot Badge
- Knight's Cross of the Order of the Zähringen Lion 2nd and 1st class with swords
- Gallipoli Star
- Silesian Eagle 2nd and 1st class
- Honour Cross of the World War 1914/1918
- Clasp to the Iron Cross 2nd and 1st class
- War Merit Cross 2nd and 1st class with swords
- Observer Badge (Luftwaffe)

== See also ==
- The Holocaust in Ukraine

== Sources ==
- Klee, Ernst (2007). Das Personenlexikon zum Dritten Reich. Wer war was vor und nach 1945. Frankfurt-am-Main: Fischer-Taschenbuch-Verlag, p. 655. ISBN 978-3-596-16048-8.
- Schiffer Publishing Ltd., ed. (2000). SS Officers List: SS-Standartenführer to SS-Oberstgruppenführer (As of 30 January 1942). Schiffer Military History Publishing. ISBN 0-7643-1061-5.
- Yerger, Mark C. (1997). The Allgemeine-SS: The Commands, Units and Leaders of the General SS. Schiffer Publishing Ltd. ISBN 0-7643-0145-4.
