= Georg-Henning Graf von Bassewitz-Behr =

Higher SS and Police Leader, SS-Gruppenführer

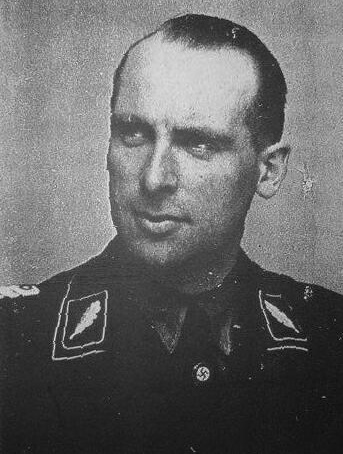
- Born: 21 March 1900; Lützow, Grand Duchy of Mecklenburg-Schwerin, German Empire
- Died: 31 January 1949 (aged 48); Magadan, Soviet Union
- Education: University of Rostock
- Status: Deceased
- Conviction: War crimes
- Penalty: 25 years imprisonment at hard labor
- Military career
- Allegiance: German Empire; Nazi Germany
- Branch: Imperial German Army; Waffen-SS
- Service years: 1918; 1931–1945
- Rank: SS-Gruppenführer and Generalleutnant of Police and the Waffen-SS
- Commands: SS and Police Leader (SSPF) of Dnepropetrovsk and Mogilev Higher SS and Police Leader (HSSPF), "Nordsee"
- Conflicts: World War I World War II

Georg-Henning Graf von Bassewitz-Behr (21 March 1900 – 31 January 1949) was a German Nazi Party member and an SS-Gruppenführer who served as an SS and Police Leader in Dnepropetrovsk, Mogilev and Hamburg during World War II. He was convicted of war crimes by the Soviet Union, sentenced to 25 years at hard labor and died in captivity.

== Early life ==
Bassewitz-Behr was born into a noble family, the son of a cavalry officer, and grew up on an estate in Lützow in the Grand Duchy of Mecklenburg-Schwerin. He passed his Abitur in 1918 and then served briefly with the Imperial German Army toward the end of the World War I. Bassewitz-Behr then managed the family estates and, from 1919 to 1920, studied agriculture at the University of Rostock. After unsuccessfully trying to start a new life as a farmer in the former colony of German South West Africa in 1930, Bassewitz-Behr returned to Germany, became a member of the Stahlhelm WWI veterans' organization and a supporter of the Nazi Party.

== SS career ==
Bassewitz-Behr joined the Nazi Party on 1 February 1930 (membership number 458,315) and the Schutzstaffel (SS number 35,466) in 1931. In 1938, as a member of the staff of the Reich Security Main Office, he became Inspector of Motorized Vehicles. In May 1940, he commanded an anti-tank detachment in the Battle of France. In preparation for the planned German attack on the Soviet Union, he was employed from the end of April to the end of July 1941 as a quartermaster on the Kommandostab Reichsführer-SS (Reichsführer-SS Command Staff).

From 11 November 1941 to 1 August 1942, Bassewitz-Behr was appointed to the post of SS and Police Leader (SSPF) of Dnepropetrovsk in Ukraine where Einsatzgruppe D was active. During this time, he was complicit in the killings of an estimated 45,000 civilians, partisans and Jews. He next was transferred, from 1 August 1942 to 20 April 1943, to the position of SSPF for Mogilev in Central Russia. From November 1942 to April 1943, he served as the deputy to the Higher SS and Police Leader "Russland Mitte", Erich von dem Bach-Zelewski.

On 20 April 1943, Bassewitz-Behr was promoted to SS-Gruppenführer and Generalleutnant of Police. From 16 February 1943 to 8 May 1945, he was the Higher SS and Police Leader (HSSPF) "Nordsee", based in Hamburg. His jurisdiction covered a wide swath of northwestern Germany, including Schleswig-Holstein, Oldenburg, eastern Hanover and Bremen. On 1 July 1944, he was appointed as a Generalleutnant of the Waffen-SS. In Hamburg, he had responsibility for the prisoner of war administration within his jurisdiction. Toward the end of the war, he was involved in the evacuation of the Neuengamme concentration camp and its satellite camps. As part of this process, 71 resistance fighters imprisoned in the Fuhlsbüttel police prison were murdered during the evacuation in April 1945.

== Post-war life ==
After the end of the war, Bassewitz-Behr was arrested on 27 October 1945. He was brought before a British military court in Hamburg for the Fuhlsbüttel police prison murders. After being acquitted in August 1947, he was extradited to the Soviet Union on 16 September 1947. He stood trial for war crimes and was sentenced to 25 years of hard labor for the mass murders in the Dnepropetrovsk area. He died two years later in a labor camp in Magadan in eastern Siberia.

== Sources ==
- Klee, Ernst (2007). Das Personenlexikon zum Dritten Reich. Wer war was vor und nach 1945. Frankfurt-am-Main: Fischer-Taschenbuch-Verlag. p. 30. ISBN 978-3-596-16048-8.
- Tenti, Katharina. "Graf Henning von Bassewitz-Behr" [Biography Database: Nazi-Era Participants]. Biografien-Datenbank: NS‑Dabeigewesene.
- Yerger, Mark C. (1997). Allgemeine-SS: The Commands, Units and Leaders of the General SS. Schiffer Publishing Ltd. p. 61. ISBN 0-7643-0145-4.
