= Rudolf Querner =

German Nazi, Higher SS and Police Leader, SS-Obergruppenführer

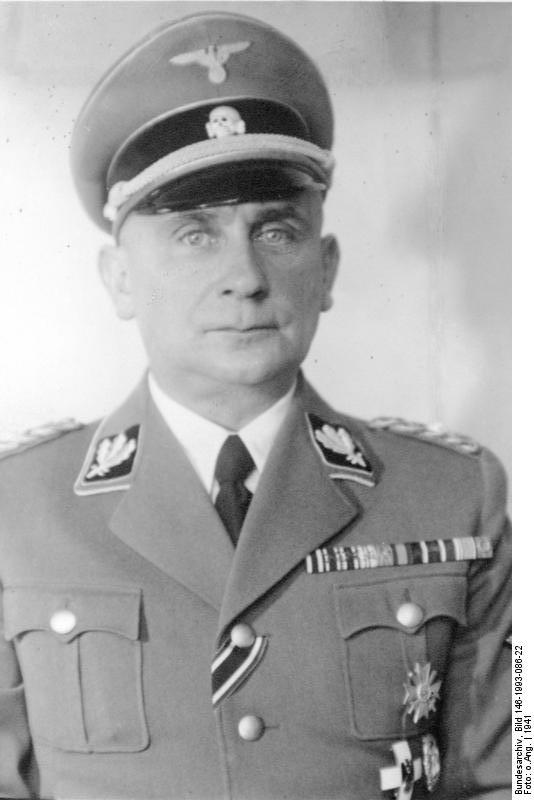
Querner in 1940

Rudolf Querner (10 June 1893 – 27 May 1945) was a German SS functionary during the Nazi era. He served as the Higher SS and Police Leader in Austria and Germany and was responsible for the evacuations and death marches from concentration camps at the end of the war. Arrested by the Allied authorities, he committed suicide in prison.

== Early life ==
Querner, the son of a manor owner, was born in Lehnsdorf near Kamenz. He served as an officer in the First World War and finished the war as a prisoner of the French. He was married in 1919 following his release and had four children during the course of the marriage. The same year he also enrolled in the police.

== SS career ==
Querner joined the Nazi Party in 1933 with the membership number of 2,385,386. From 1936 to 1937 he served as Generalmajor of the Ordnungspolizei (Orpo) and from September 1939 was the inspector of commanders in Hamburg. He joined the Schutzstaffel (SS) in 1938 as member number 308,240. He also served as the Orpo commander in Prague in 1939 and from 1940 to 1941 as inspector general of county constabulary.

From 1 May 1941 to at the end of January 1943 Querner was SS and Police Leader (HSSPF) Nordsee in Military district X, based in Hamburg. Working closely with Gauleiter Karl Kaufmann Querners had responsibility over all police matters and was also involved in the deportation of the Portuguese Jewish community in Hamburg, which began at the end of October 1941. Whilst based in Hamburg Querner ordered large quantities of Zyklon-B from Tesch & Stabenow pest control company.

From January 1943 to October 1944 he was HSSPF for district XVII, based at Vienna. On 21 June 1943 he was promoted to SS-Obergruppenführer and on 1 July 1944 to General of the Waffen-SS. Following the 20 July plot Querner's district undertook harsh measures against any possible revolution, although Querner had delegated authority in this instance to his subordinate Heinrich Kodré.

He resumed his career as HSSPF in district XI, based in Braunschweig, from October 1944 to 8 May 1945. Here he was largely responsible for the evacuation of the concentration and POW camps in the district.

== Arrest and suicide ==
Arrested at the end of the war, Querner committed suicide later in May 1945, aged 51, at Magdeburg in captivity.
