= Otto Hellwig =

Nazi Germany police leader

Otto Hellwig (24 February 1898, Nordhausen – 20 August 1962, Hanover) was a German SS-Gruppenführer (1944) and lieutenant general of police (1944), as well as an SS and Police Leader.

== Career ==
Hellwig participated in the First World War as a soldier. After the war, he joined the Sturmabteilung Roßbach, a paramilitary organization of the Weimar Republic that was unrelated to the commonly known paramilitary Sturmabteilung (SA). He worked as a policeman and was in the Prussian Schutzpolizei. From the late 1920s, he worked for the police administration in Bielefeld in the district of Minden, and was promoted to police captain in the early 1930s. From 1934, he was the commander of the Lippe Landespolizei. Hellwig joined the Nazi Party (NSDAP membership number 2,155,531) in April 1933 and the Schutzstaffel (SS membership number 272,289) in July 1935.

From 1935 to 1937, he was head of the Gestapo in Breslau. Thereafter, he was commander of the Führerschule of the Sicherheitspolizei (SiPo) and the Sicherheitsdienst (SD), an institution that trained future leaders of the SS, SD, and SiPo, in Berlin-Charlottenburg until March 1941. Hellwig was the instructor and commander of one of the Einsatzkommandos of the Einsatzgruppe under Udo von Woyrsch, which prepared the Gleiwitz incident as part of Operation Tannenberg before the Invasion of Poland in 1939. After a short time as head of the Gestapo in Katowice in 1940, he was appointed the Inspekteur der Sicherheitspolizei und des SD (IdS) in Stettin.

From late October 1942 to May 1943, he was SS and Police Leader (German: SS- und Polizeiführer, SSPF) in Zhitomir, and then SSPF in Białystok until July 1944. Under his leadership, as part of anti-partisan operations, the SS and police destroyed 108 villages and killed another 2,336 people. From December 1944, he was deputy leader of SS-Oberabschnitt Nordost (Northeast), and deputy Higher SS and Police Leader Nordost, based in Königsberg, until May 1945.

After the war, Hellwig was interned. Nothing is known concerning his denazification, as investigators failed to connect him to the killings. In the early 1950s, Hellwig wrote about his experiences regarding Operation Tannenberg. Hellwig died in August 1962 in Hanover.

== Bibliography ==
- Ernst Klee: Das Personenlexikon zum Dritten Reich. Fischer, Frankfurt am Main 2007. ISBN 978-3-596-16048-8. (Second revised edition)
- Christian Gerlach: Kalkulierte Morde. Die deutsche Wirtschafts- und Vernichtungspolitik in Weißrussland 1941 bis 1944, Hamburger Edition, Hamburg 1998. ISBN 3-930908-54-9
