= Wilhelm Rediess =

German Waffen-SS general and police leader (1900–1945)

Friedrich Wilhelm Rediess
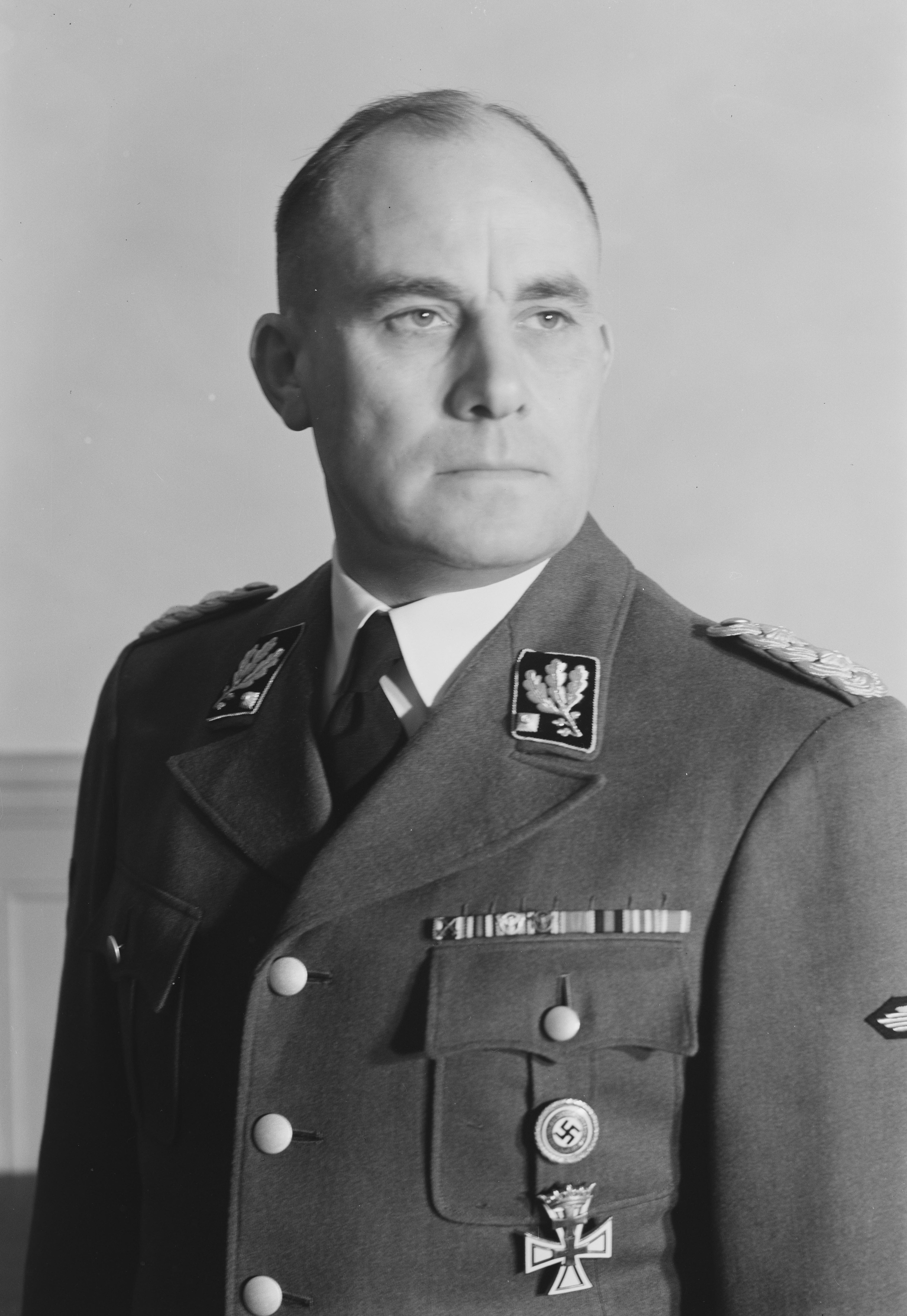
- Rediess in 1941
- Born: 10 October 1900; Heinsberg, Rhine Province, Kingdom of Prussia; German Empire
- Died: 8 May 1945 (aged 44); Oslo, Norway
- Military career
- Allegiance: Nazi Germany
- Rank: SS-Obergruppenführer
- Unit: Schutzstaffel
- Commands: SS and Police Leader, Norway

Friedrich Wilhelm Rediess (German: Friedrich Wilhelm Otto Redieß; 10 October 1900 – 8 May 1945) was a German Nazi official who served as the SS and police leader during the German occupation of Norway in the Second World War. He was also the commander of all SS troops stationed in occupied Norway and assumed command from 22 June 1940 until his death by suicide in 1945.

== Early life and career ==
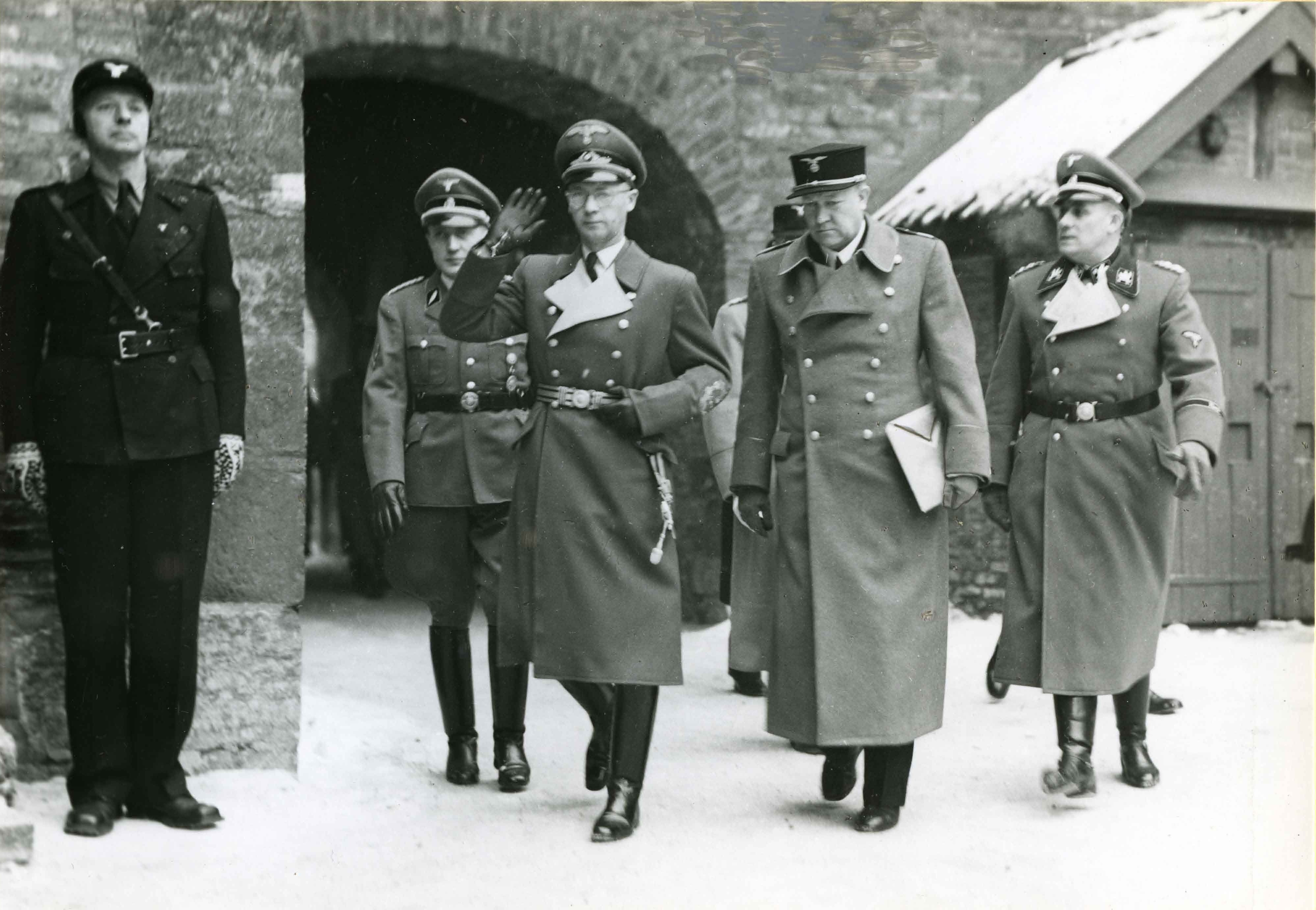
From left to right: unknown, Georg Wilhelm Müller, Josef Terboven, Vidkun Quisling, Wilhelm Rediess.

Unknown men stand around the remains of Wilhelm Rediess. Caption (in Norwegian): "4. That which once was general Rediess."

Rediess was born in Heinsberg, Rhine Province, Kingdom of Prussia, German Empire, the son of a court employee. After school, Rediess became an electrician. In June 1918, he enlisted in the German Army during the First World War and served as an infantryman until the armistice in November 1918.

He then worked as an electrician until he lost his job in the Great Depression.

In May 1925, Rediess joined the SA and in December was approved for membership in the Nazi Party. He led a Düsseldorf SA company in 1927 and was transferred to the SS with his unit in 1930. Promotion swiftly followed for Rediess, who achieved the rank of Gruppenführer (major general) in 1935. At one point, he served as the division commander of SS-Oberabschnitt Südost.

In April 1932, Rediess was elected to the Landtag of Prussia where he served until it was dissolved in October 1933. He then served as a deputy in the Reichstag from 1933 until his death in May 1945. In November 1933, he was elected from electoral constituency 22 (Düsseldorf-East) and, from 1936 on, he was elected as a representative of electoral constituency 1 (East Prussia).

== Second World War ==
At the onset of the Second World War, Rediess was responsible for implementing German racial laws in Prussia. He oversaw the deportation of Jews from East Prussia and was then given the task of eradicating 1,558 Jewish deportees who were deemed mentally ill.

Rediess borrowed "gas vans" and personnel from other SS units and offered a bounty of ten Reichsmark for each Jew killed. It took 19 days to accomplish those killings, and Rediess reneged on the payment.

After the German invasion of Norway, Rediess was transferred there to work with Reichskommissar Josef Terboven. In March 1941, citing reports of large numbers of Norwegian women being impregnated by German soldiers, Rediess implemented the German Lebensborn program in Norway.

The program encouraged the production of "racially pure" Aryan children, who were usually sired by SS troops. Ultimately, 8,000 children were born under the auspices of the program, which made Norway second only to Germany in registered Aryan births during the war.

== Death ==
Rediess committed suicide by a self-inflicted gunshot wound upon the collapse of the Third Reich in Norway on 8 May 1945. His remains were destroyed on the same day that Terboven killed himself by detonating fifty kilograms of dynamite in a bunker on the Skaugum compound.

== Awards and decorations ==
Among his many decorations was the Honour Cross of the World War without Swords, the Danzig Cross, 1st Class, the Nazi Party Long Service Award in Bronze (10 years) and Silver (15 years), the SS Long Service Award (10 years), the SS-Ehrendegen, the DRL/Reich Sports Badge (Deutsches Reichssportabzeichen) in Silver on 13 August 1937, the Rider's Badge, the SA Sports Badge in Gold, the SS-Ehrenring, the War Merit Cross (1939), 2nd and 1st Class with Swords (1st Class on 30 January 1942) and the Iron Cross (1939), 2nd Class on 11 November 1943.

== See also ==
- List SS-Obergruppenführer
