= Theodor Berkelmann =

German SS functionary

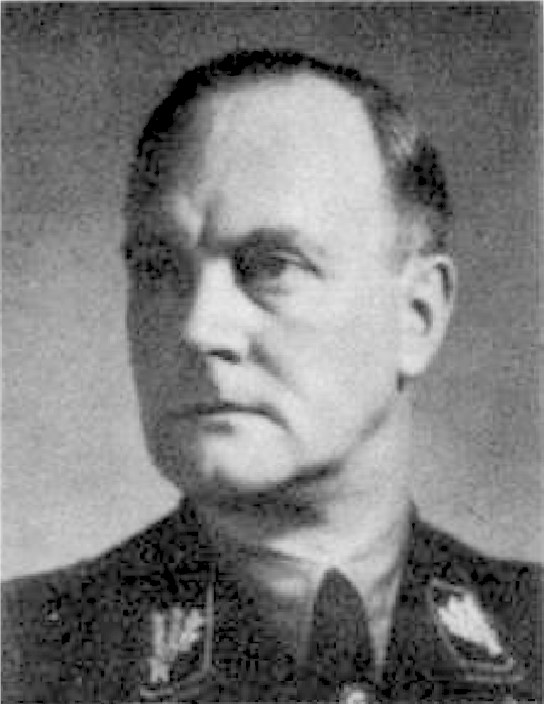

Higher SS and Police Leader (HSSPF)

Personal details
- Born: 17 April 1894 Metz, Alsace-Lorraine, Germany
- Died: 28 December 1943 (aged 49) Poznań, Poland
- Party: Nazi Party

Military service
- Rank: SS-Obergruppenführer

Theodor Berkelmann (17 April 1894 – 28 December 1943) was a German SS functionary during the Nazi era who served as the Higher SS and Police Leader in Saarland and Moselle during World War II.

== Biography ==
Theodor Berkelmann was born in Le Ban-Saint-Martin near Metz, in Alsace-Lorraine, which was then part of Germany. During the First World War, he served in the German Army. Berkelmann served as a soldier, before being promoted to officer. He was awarded the Iron Cross Ist class.

By 1936, Berkelmann was promoted to SS-Gruppenführer. At the beginning of the Second World War, Berkelmann was appointed Higher SS and Police Leader in Saarland and Moselle. In 1942, he was promoted to the rank of SS-Obergruppenführer. Berkelmann died of a brain tumor in Poznań, in 1943.

== Sources ==
- (de) Ruth Bettina Birn: Die Höheren SS- und Polizeiführer. Himmlers Vertreter im Reich und in den besetzten Gebieten. Droste Verlag, Düsseldorf, 1986.
- (de) Joachim Lilla : Statisten in Uniform. Die Mitglieder des Reichstags 1933-1945, Droste, Düsseldorf 2004.
- (de) Erich Stockhorst: 5000 Köpfe - Wer war was im Dritten Reich, Kiel 2000.
- (de) Klaus D. Patzwall (Hg.): Das Goldene Parteiabzeichen und seine Verleihungen ehrenhalber 1934 -1944, Verlag Klaus D. Patzwall, Norderstedt 2004.
