= Paul Scharfe =

German Nazi, head of the SS Court Main Office, SS-Obergruppenführer

- Born: 6 September 1876; Danzig, Kingdom of Prussia, German Empire
- Died: 29 July 1942 (aged 65) Starnberg, Bavaria, Nazi Germany
- Allegiance: German Empire; Nazi Germany
- Branch: Imperial German Army; Schutzstaffel
- Service years: 1897–1918; 1931–1942
- Rank: SS-Obergruppenführer and General of the Waffen-SS
- Commands: SS Court Main Office
- Awards: Iron Cross, 2nd class War Merit Cross, 1st and 2nd class with Swords

Paul Scharfe (6 September 1876 – 29 July 1942) was an SS-Obergruppenführer and General of the Waffen-SS in Nazi Germany and first chief of the SS Court Main Office.

== Early life ==
Scharfe, son of a headmaster, was born in Danzig in Prussia (today Gdańsk, Poland) and, after completing his education, enrolled as an officer cadet in August 1895, attended the military school in Anklam and was commissioned a Leutnant in the Imperial German Army in January 1897. He was a comrade of Paul Hausser. After marrying in 1903, Scharfe left active service and joined the Landwehr reserves. He became a police commissioner, first in Adenau from 1905 to 1912 and then in Schrimm (today, Śrem, in Poland).

In World War I, Scharfe fought on the eastern front from September 1914 to October 1915 as a company and battalion commander, earning the Iron Cross, 2nd class. He was then posted to the Prussian Interior Ministry and ended the war as a Landwehr Major. He resumed his police career after the war, serving in the Prussian police from 1921 to 1931, beginning with the security police (Schutzpolizei) in Halle and retiring as an Oberstleutnant of police in Berlin.

== SS career ==
On 1 October 1931, Scharfe joined the Nazi Party (membership number 665,697) and the SS (member number 14,220). He was first assigned as head of the security section in the SS leadership office in Munich. In June 1933, Reichsführer-SS Heinrich Himmler made him responsible for all the SS courts. On 1 July 1939, he was appointed the first chief (Hauptamtschef) of the newly formed SS Court Main Office, the legal department of the SS. This office was responsible for formulating the laws and codes of conduct for the SS and the German police, conducting its own investigations and trials, as well as administering the SS and Police Courts and penal camps. This legal status meant all SS personnel were accountable only to the SS courts. This effectively placed the SS above German law and outside the jurisdiction of civilian courts. In a speech to a meeting of SS-Gruppenführers in January 1939 in Berlin, Scharfe explained the rationale for this SS jurisdiction policy thusly:

Compared to the ordinary member of the Party, the SS man naturally occupies a special place, primarily because it is his duty to protect the Movement and its Führer, if necessary at the sacrifice of his life. This special position … of course means that the SS man must be dealt with in a special way.

On 20 November 1939, Scharfe was officially recognized as Himmler's deputy in all SS disciplinary matters. He was granted the Waffen-SS rank of Generalleutnant on 9 November 1940, and was promoted to SS-Obergruppenführer and General of the Waffen-SS on 20 April 1942. Scharfe died of natural causes on 29 July 1942. His successor, from 15 August 1942, was Franz Breithaupt.

SS ranks
Date	Rank
1 October 1931	SS-Untersturmführer
22 December 1931	SS-Hauptsturmführer
30 March 1932	SS-Sturmbannführer
14 October 1932	SS-Standartenführer
3 August 1933	SS-Oberführer
20 April 1934	SS-Brigadeführer
30 January 1937	SS-Gruppenführer
9 November 1940	Generalleutnant der Waffen-SS
20 April 1942	SS-Obergruppenführer und General der Waffen-SS

== See also ==
- List SS-Obergruppenführer

== Sources ==
- Höhne, Heinz (1971). The Order of the Death's Head: The Story of Hitler's SS. Ballantine Books. ISBN 0-345-28333-3.
- McNab, Chris (2009). The SS: 1923–1945. Amber Books Ltd. ISBN 978-1-906626-49-5.
- Miller, Michael (2006). Leaders of the SS and German Police, Vol. 1. San Jose, CA: R. James Bender. ISBN 978-93-297-0037-2.
- Schiffer Publishing Ltd., ed. (2000). SS Officers List: SS-Standartenführer to SS-Oberstgruppenführer (As of 30 January 1942). Schiffer Military History Publishing. ISBN 0-7643-1061-5.
- Williams, Max (2018). SS Elite: The Senior Leaders of Hitler's Praetorian Guard. Vol. 3. Fonthill Media LLC. ISBN 978-1-781-55638-2.

== Additional reading ==
- Seidler, Franz W. (1991). Die Militärgerichtsbarkeit der Deutschen Wehrmacht 1939–1945. Herbig. p. 202. ISBN 3-926-58460-2.
