= Franz Breithaupt =

SS-Obergruppenführer, chief of the SS Court Main Office

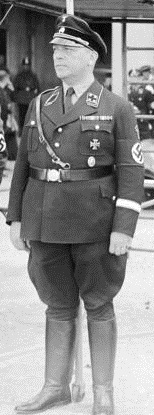
- Breithaupt in 1933
- Born: 8 December 1880; Berlin, German Empire
- Died: 29 April 1945 (aged 64) Bach, Allied-occupied Austria
- Allegiance: Nazi Germany
- Branch: Schutzstaffel; Waffen-SS
- Service years: 1932–1945
- Rank: SS-Obergruppenführer und General der Waffen-SS
- Commands: SS Court Main Office

Franz Breithaupt (8 December 1880 – 29 April 1945) was a German SS functionary during the Nazi era who rose to the rank of SS-Obergruppenführer. He served as the Polizeipräsident of Breslau (today, Wrocław) from April 1941 to August 1942. From that point until April 1945, he was chief of the SS Court Main Office (Hauptamt SS-Gericht). Breithaupt was murdered by his SS aide Karl Lang just prior to the end of the war in Europe.

== Biography ==
Breithaupt was born in Berlin on 8 December 1880. He served in the German Army during World War I. In August 1914, he was wounded in combat near Progarts. Thereafter, he was in several hospitals until the end of October 1914. By the end of the war, he was commander of the Vorposten (forward posts) of the 9. Kavallerie-Division. In November 1919 he was discharged from active duty in the army with the rank of major. He served in a Freikorps in Berlin until 1921. Breithaupt then went into business training at a factory in Lübbecke. He went on to work as a salesman and later was a business manager of the Deutschen Turnerschaft from 1923 until 1931.

In January 1929, he joined Der Stahlhelm (The Steel helmet, League of Front-line Soldiers), one of the many paramilitary organizations that arose after the German defeat of World War I. The league was a rallying point for revanchist and nationalistic forces from the beginning. By January 1931, he was chairman of the board of directors for "Ireks AG" in Kulmbach and acted as its business manager in Berlin.

Breithaupt joined the Nazi Party (# 602,663) on 1 August 1931 and then joined the Sturmabteilung (SA) on 27 November and became an SA-Sturmbannführer. In December 1932, he joined the Schutzstaffel (# 39,719) as an SS-Sturmbannführer (major) and was assigned as an adjutant to the staff of Reichsführer-SS Heinrich Himmler replacing Viktor Brack. On 31 July 1933, he was promoted to SS-Obersturmbannführer (lt. colonel) and then to SS-Standartenführer (colonel) on 9 November of the same year. He was promoted to SS-Oberführer (senior colonel) on 9 November 1934. Breithaupt served on Himmler's staff until 1 April 1936. Later, on 9 November 1938, he was promoted to the rank of SS-Brigadeführer (Generalmajor). Breithaupt was an unsuccessful candidate for the Reichstag in April 1938.

He was assigned to the SS-Hauptamt in Berlin from 1 April 1936 to 1 January 1941. He served as the official Polizeipräsident (police president) of Breslau (today, Wrocław) from 4 April 1941 to 15 August 1942. Breithaupt was promoted to SS-Gruppenführer und Generalleutnant der Waffen-SS on 15 August 1942. Breithaupt was then chief of the Hauptamt SS-Gericht (SS Court Main Office) from 15 August 1942 until his murder on 29 April 1945.

This office was responsible for formulating the laws and codes for the SS and police, conducting its own investigations and trials, as well as administering the SS and Police Courts and penal systems. This legal status meant all SS personnel were only accountable to the Hauptamt SS Gericht. This effectively placed the SS above German law, enabling its members to live by its own rules and conventions. The Hauptamt SS Gericht headquarters were the high court offices in Munich. The Hauptamt SS Gericht had 605 lawyers that passed sentences on members of the German armed forces and SS. Breithaupt was last promoted in rank to SS-Obergruppenführer und General der Waffen-SS on 20 April 1944.

== Death ==
Breithaupt was murdered by gunshot by his aide SS-Untersturmführer (2nd lieutenant) Karl Lang in Bach on 29 April 1945.

== Awards and decorations ==
- Iron Cross (1914), 2nd (22 November 1914) and 1st class (31 May 1916)
- Military Merit Order, 4th class with Swords (Bavaria, 22 February 1915)
- Friedrich Cross (Anhalt, 25 November 1915)
- Cross for Merit in War (Duchy of Saxe-Meiningen, 4 March 1916)
- Knight's Cross of the Royal House Order of Hohenzollern with swords (9 June 1917)
- Military Merit Cross, 2nd class (Mecklenburg-Schwerin, 1 September 1917)
- Wound Badge of 1918 in black and silver (10 August 1918)
- Nazi Party Long Service Award in Bronze
- Commander's Cross with swords of the Ducal Saxe-Ernestine House Order (1 December 1935)
- Olympic Games Decoration, 1st class (16 August 1936)
- Grand Officer Cross of the Imperial Order of Manchurian (17 January 1941)
- War Merit Cross, 2nd class (1 May 1942), 1st class with Swords (30 January 1943)
- Commander of the Order of Merit of the Republic of Hungary (30 July 1942)
- Social Welfare Decoration, 2nd class (30 January 1943)
