= SS Court Main Office =

Legal department of the SS

Hauptamt SS-Gericht
- Logo of the SS

Agency overview
- Formed: c. 1933
- Preceding agency: SS-Gericht
- Dissolved: 8 May 1945
- Jurisdiction: Germany; Occupied Europe
- Headquarters: Hauptamt SS-Gericht, Karlstraße, Munich; 48°8′35.07″N 11°33′58.10″E
- Employees: 650
- Minister responsible: Heinrich Himmler, (1933–1945)
- Agency executives: Ernst Bach (1933); Paul Scharfe (1933–1942); Franz Breithaupt (1942–1945); Günther Reinecke (1945)
- Parent agency: (Schutzstaffel) Allgemeine-SS

The SS Court Main Office (German: Hauptamt SS-Gericht) - one of the 12 SS main departments - was the legal department of the SS in Nazi Germany. It was responsible for formulating the laws and codes for the SS and various other groups of the police, conducting investigations and trials, as well as administering the SS and Police Courts and penal systems.

== History ==
Early in the Nazi regime, SS personnel were charged with breaking the law through the performance of their duties at the Dachau concentration camp in 1934; moreover, their atrocities and lack of discipline during the invasion of Poland caused some protests among Wehrmacht officials. Under such circumstances, the Nazi Party realised it would be expedient to remove the SS and police units from the jurisdiction of the civilian courts. This was achieved through an ordinance by the Council of Ministers for the Defense of the Reich on 17 October 1939.

This legal status meant all SS personnel were only accountable to the Hauptamt SS Gericht. This effectively placed the SS above German law and able to live by its own rules and conventions.

== Organization ==
The SS Court Main Office was an extension of the SS Gericht (SS Court), an organization that administered surveys of the SS and police forces and their codes of honor. The organisation had four departments (German: Ämter or Amtsgruppe):

- Amt (Department) I: Legal affairs - SS-Oberführer Reinecke
- Amt II: Organisation, personnel & disciplinary matters - SS-Obersturmbannführer Hinderfield
- Amt III: Pardons, reprieves and the execution of sentences - SS-Sturmbannführer Burmeister
- Amt IV: Liaison office - SS-Obersturmbannführer Krause

The SS Court Main Office headquarters were the high court offices in Munich. The organisation had over 600 lawyers that passed sentences on members of the German armed forces and SS, though Reichsführer-SS Heinrich Himmler, would intervene as he saw fit when it came to conviction and the sentencing phase. By 1944, the number of the "SS Main Offices" within Germany had grown from 8 to 12.

== SS and Police Courts ==
The SS Court Main Office administered also 38 regional SS courts throughout Nazi Germany under legal jurisdiction which superseded civilian courts. These laws extended to all SS and police force members operating in Germany or throughout occupied Europe.

The SS and Police Courts were the only authority that could try SS personnel for criminal behaviour. The different SS and Police Courts were as follows:

- SS- und Polizeigericht: Standard SS and Police Court for trials of SS officers and enlisted men accused of minor and somewhat serious crimes
- Feldgerichte: Waffen-SS Court for courts-martial of Waffen-SS personnel accused of violating the military penal code of the German Armed Forces.
- Oberstes SS- und Polizeigericht: The Supreme SS and Police Court for trial of serious crimes and also any infraction committed by SS generals.
- SS- und Polizeigericht z.b. V.: The Extraordinary SS and Police Court was a special tribunal that was assembled to deal with highly sensitive issues which were desired to be kept secret even from the SS itself.

The one exception to the SS and Police Courts jurisdiction involved members of the SS who were serving on active duty in the Wehrmacht (armed forces). In such cases, the SS member in question was subject to military law and could face charges before a standard military tribunal.

== Investigations by Judge Georg Konrad Morgen ==
In 1943 SS-Sturmbannführer Georg Konrad Morgen, from the SS Court Main Office, began investigating corruption and criminal activity within the Nazi concentration camps system. He eventually prosecuted so many SS officers that by April 1944, Himmler personally ordered him to restrain his cases. Among the people he investigated was Karl Otto Koch, the commandant of Buchenwald and Majdanek, and husband of Ilse Koch — as well as Buchenwald's concentration camp doctor Waldemar Hoven, who was accused of murdering both inmates and camp guards who threatened to testify against Koch.

In 1944, while investigating the Auschwitz commander, Rudolf Höss, Morgen's assistant SS-Hauptscharführer Gerhard Putsch disappeared. Some theorized this was a warning for Morgen to ease up on his investigations as the building where his files were stored was burned down shortly thereafter.

Morgen, who had been an SS judge and investigator, later testified at the Nuremberg trials. He claimed that he fought for justice during the Nazi era and cited his list of 800 investigations into criminal activity at concentration camps during his two years of activity.
