= Ernst-Heinrich Schmauser =

German Nazi, Higher SS and Police Leader, SS-Obergruppenführer

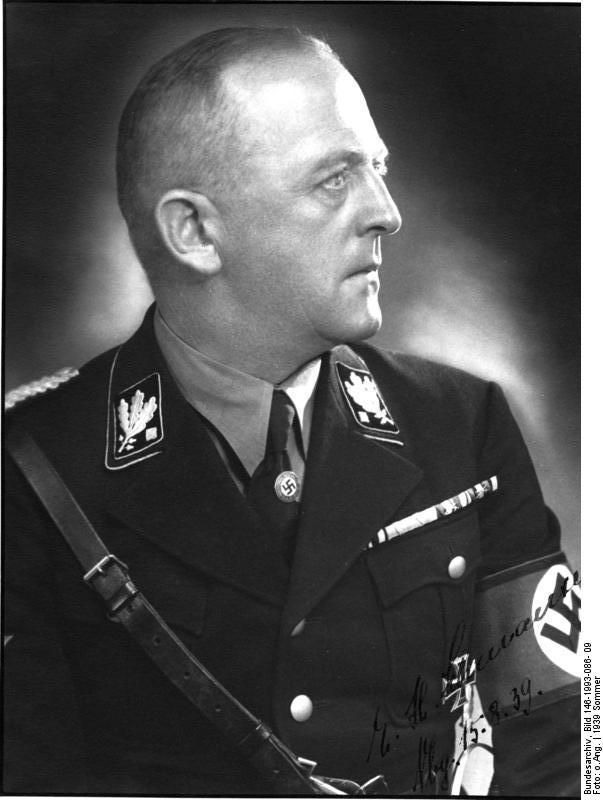
- Schmauser in 1939
- Born: 18 January 1890; Hof, Kingdom of Bavaria, German Empire
- Died: 10 February 1945 (aged 55) site unknown
- Military career
- Allegiance: German Empire; Nazi Germany
- Branch: Royal Saxon Army; Schutzstaffel; Waffen-SS
- Service years: 1911–1919; 1930–1945
- Rank: Hauptmann; SS-Obergruppenführer und General der Waffen-SS
- Conflicts: World War I World War II
- Awards: Iron Cross, 1st and 2nd class Wound Badge in silver Knight's Cross of the Order of Albert, second class with Swords; Knight's Cross of the Military Order of St. Henry

Ernst-Heinrich Schmauser (18 January 1890 – 10 February 1945) was a German Nazi Reichstag deputy and SS-Obergruppenführer who was the Higher SS and Police Leader (HSSPF) in Breslau (today, Wrocław) during World War II. He was responsible for the death march from Auschwitz–Birkenau concentration camp, in which upwards of 25 percent of the prisoners were killed. In the last months of the war, he was captured by the Red Army and presumed killed.

== Early life ==
Schmauser was born in Hof, Bavaria, the son of a businessman. He attended Volksschule there, and then Realschule in Bayreuth. After graduation, he pursued a military career. In October 1911, he joined the 11th Bavarian Infantry Regiment "von der Tann" in Regensburg. In March 1912, he transferred as an officer cadet to the 9th Royal Saxon Army's 133rd Infantry Regiment, based in Zwickau .

Schmauser trained at the Military Academy in Hanover, was commissioned a Leutnant and fought in the First World War. He was engaged in combat on the western front with the 133rd and 183rd Infantry Regiments. He was promoted to Oberleutnant and served as a company commander. He was wounded three times in battle, including being gassed. He was decorated on multiple occasions, receiving the Iron Cross, 1st and 2nd class, the Silver Wound Badge, and the Knight's Cross of the Order of Albert (Second Class) with Swords. On 9 November 1915, he received the Knight's Cross of the Military-St. Heinrich's Order. Following Schmauser's demobilization in February 1919, he was promoted to Hauptmann and given permission to continue wearing the uniform of the 133rd Infantry Regiment.

From 1919 to 1933, Schmauser worked in banking as a cashier in Zwickau. It was a temporary career path which he considered beneath his social standing. He married in 1921, and had two children by his wife. Schmauser joined the Nazi Party in 1921, and was head of the Sturmabteilung (SA) in Zwickau. When the Party and SA were banned in the wake of the Beer Hall Putsch in November 1924, he joined the right-wing conservative voting alliance known as the Völkisch-Social Bloc. He was sporadically active on the political scene as were many other former military officers in the wake of the collapsing Weimar economy.

== Nazi Party membership and political career ==
On 1 March 1930, Schmauser rejoined the Nazi Party (Party membership number: 215,704). As an early Party member, he would later be awarded the Golden Party Badge. He also rejoined the SA at that time as an SA-Sturmführer with Sturm 10 in Zwickau.

In the Reichstag elections of July 1932, Schmauser was elected as a Nazi deputy from electoral constituency 29, Leipzig, but in the election of November 1932 he lost his mandate. At the November 1933 election, Schmauser returned as a deputy for constituency 24, Upper Bavaria–Swabia, and at the March 1936 election switched to constituency 26, Franconia, retaining this seat until his death.

== Peacetime SS career ==
On 14 October 1930, Schmauser transferred from the SA to the Schutzstaffel, entering with the rank of SS-Sturmbannführer (SS number: 3,359). He led the local SS detachment in Zwickau. From 15 December 1930, he led the 7th SS-Standarte in Plauen and was promoted to SS-Standartenführer with effect from 15 October. From 27 August 1932, he headed SS-Abschnitt (District) XVI, based in Zwickau. On 15 July 1933, Schmauser, on request of Reichsführer-SS Heinrich Himmler, took over the leadership of the SS-Gruppe "Süd", headquartered in Munich. At that time, he left his banking job and became a full-time SS officer. In November 1933, his command was renamed SS-Oberabschnitt (Main District) Süd.

The purge of the SA leadership and other enemies of the state began on 30 June 1934 in an action which became known as the Night of the Long Knives. Schmauser was considered one of the few ranking members of the SS trustworthy enough to be involved in the arrests and killings (despite his past as an SA officer). Schmauser was present when SS-Brigadeführer Theodor Eicke and SS-Obersturmbannführer Michael Lippert murdered SA-Stabschef Ernst Röhm in his cell at Stadelheim prison. On 1 April 1936, Schmauser was transferred from Munich to Nuremberg to take command of SS-Oberabschnitt "Main" and, on 20 April 1937, he was promoted to SS-Obergruppenführer.

== Wartime service ==
During the Second World War, Schmauser performed military service with the SS-Totenkopf Division for two weeks in March 1940. On 1 May 1941, he was transferred from Nuremberg to become the Higher SS and Police Leader "Südost" in Silesia with his headquarters in Breslau. He also simultaneously held command of the SS-Oberabschnitt "Südost." Of note, the Auschwitz extermination camp was located within his jurisdiction. He remained a faithful Nazi and a consummate technocrat. A telling example is witnessed in the fact that Schmauser had no qualms about using Jewish slave labor, as he reported in April 1942 to Himmler how pleased he was to have Jews working for his operation, since workers were otherwise scarcely available. When the first gas chamber was tested at Auschwitz in the summer of 1942, Schmauser was present, as were both Himmler and Gauleiter Fritz Bracht of Upper Silesia. Himmler appointed Schmauser a General of the Waffen-SS on 1 July 1944.

=== Role in Auschwitz death march ===
Early in the summer of 1944, the SS began transferring the 130,000 prisoners at Auschwitz–Birkenau to other camps since the Red Army was moving rapidly west. By 21 December 1944 the Red Army had drawn close enough that orders were issued for Auschwitz to be totally evacuated. It was Schmauser who followed Himmler's order to expedite the camp's inmates away as he was in charge in Silesia. Not knowing exactly how to handle the matter, however, he telephoned SS-Obergruppenführer Oswald Pohl, who told him that Himmler wanted no 'healthy' prisoners left alive in the camp.

More than 56,000 prisoners were marched westwards in harsh winter conditions. In accordance with Higher Police Headquarters (HSSPF Breslau), Schmauser ensured to the best of his ability that no inmates would end up in the hands of the Soviets. Despite the fact that Schmauser instructed the guards to evacuate everyone, some inmates too sick to make the trek were just left behind. Nonetheless, camp guards shot those too weak to continue or those who failed to keep pace, which amounted to upwards of 25 percent of them. A small percentage eventually made it to the Groß-Rosen concentration camp in Lower Silesia where they were transited away westwards.

On 20 January 1945, Schmauser issued an order to murder the remaining inmates and destroy evidence of Operation Reinhard. An SS detachment shot 200 Jewish women and then blew up the buildings that housed crematoria I and II. Under order from Schmauser, 700 prisoners from Auschwitz–Birkenau and other sub-camps were killed by SS units. The 1st Ukrainian Front of the Red Army arrived on 27 January 1945 and liberated the Auschwitz concentration camp. Nearly 8,000 inmates escaped death because the remaining SS units had fled as the Red Army arrived.

=== Disappearance ===
On 10 February 1945, Schmauser was driving from Waldenburg (today, Wałbrzych) in a convoy of several vehicles when he encountered some German troops near Altenrode. They informed him that Soviet armored spearheads had already broken through. For unknown reasons, Schmauser did not heed their warnings and drove on. He went missing that date. It is believed that he fell into the hands of the Red Army and was either killed immediately or executed later in captivity. SS-Obergruppenführer Richard Hildebrandt was appointed to succeed Schmauser in his Silesian commands on 23 February 1945. Schmauser was formally declared dead, effective 31 December 1945.

== SS and police ranks ==
SS ranks
Rank	Date
SS-Sturmbannführer	14 October 1930
SS-Standartenführer	15 October 1930
SS-Oberführer	6 October 1932
SS-Brigadeführer	3 July 1933
SS-Gruppenführer	15 September 1935
SS-Obergruppenführer	20 April 1937
General der Polizei	10 April 1941
General der Waffen-SS	1 July 1944

== See also ==
- List of people who disappeared
- List of SS-Obergruppenführer
- Death marches during the Holocaust

== Bibliography ==
- Birn, Ruth Bettina (1986). Die Höheren SS- und Polizeiführer. Himmlers Vertreter im Reich und in den besetzten Gebieten [The Higher SS and Police Leaders. Himmler's Representatives in the Reich and in the Occupied Territories]. Düsseldorf: Droste Verlag. ISBN 3-7700-0710-7
- Blatman, Daniel (2011). The Death Marches: The Final Phase of Nazi Genocide. Cambridge: Harvard University Press. ISBN 978-0-67405-049-5
- Butler, Rupert (2004). Hitler's Death's Head Division: SS-Totenkopf Division. South Yorkshire: Pen & Sword Books. ISBN 978-1-84415-205-6
- Campbell, Brice (2004). The SA Generals and the Rise of Nazism. Lexington: The University Press of Kentucky. ISBN 978-0-81319-098-3
- Cesarani David, ed. (2004) Holocaust. Critical Concepts in Historical Studies, vol. II. New York: Routledge. ISBN 0-415-27511-3.
- Długoborski, Wacław, Franciszek Piper, and Aleksander Lasik, eds. (1999). Auschwitz 1940–1945. Oswieecim, Poland: Auschwitz-Birkenau State Museum, 1999.
- Eltzschig, Johannes and Michael Walter, ed. (2001). The Nuremberg Medical Trial 1946/1947: Transcripts, Material of the Prosecution and Defense, Related Documents. Guide to the Microfiche-Edition. Munich: Saur Verlag. ISBN 3-598-32154-6 p. 140
- Grieser, Utho (1974). Himmlers Mann in Nürnberg. Der Fall Benno Martin: Eine Studie zur Struktur des 3. Reiches in der "Stadt der Reichsparteitage" [Himmler's Man in Nuremberg. The Case of Benno Martin: A Study on the Structure of the Third Reich in the "City of the Party Rallies"] in (Nürnberger Werkstücke zur Stadt- und Landesgeschichte, Band 13). Nürnberg: Stadtarchiv Nürnberg Verlag. ISBN 3-87432-025-1
- Hilberg, Raul (1985). The Destruction of the European Jews, vol. 3. New York: Holmes and Meier. ISBN 0-8419-0832-X (set)
- Klee, Ernst (2007). Das Personenlexikon zum Dritten Reich [The People Lexicon of the Third Reich]. Updated 2nd Edition. Frankfurt am Main: Fischer Verlag. ISBN 978-3-59616-048-8.
- Lilla, Joachim. Staatsminister, leitende Verwaltungsbeamte und (NS)-Funktionsträger in Bayern 1918 bis 1945 [Minister of State, Senior Government Officials and National Socialist Functionaries in Bavaria from 1918 to 1945]. As found in the Bayerische Landesbibliothek Online. See: Schmauser, Ernst-Heinrich
- Longerich, Peter (2010). Holocaust: The Nazi Persecution and Murder of the Jews (Google Books preview). Oxford University Press. ISBN 978-0-19960-073-1.
- Longerich, Peter (2011). Heinrich Himmler: A Life (Google Books preview). New York: Oxford University Press. ISBN 978-0-19959-232-6.
- Miller, Michael D.; Schulz, Andreas (2015). Leaders of the SS & German Police. Vol. 2 Reichsführer SS – Gruppenführer (Hans Haltermann to Walter Kruger). R. James Bender Publishing. ISBN 978-1-932-97025-8.
- Rees, Laurence (2005). Auschwitz. Geschichte eines Verbrechens [Auschwitz: History of a Crime]. Berlin: Satz LVD. ISBN 978-3-55007-851-4
- Richter, Georg D. (1937). Der Königlich Sächsische Militär-St. Heinrichs-Orden 1736–1918, Ein Ehrenblatt der Sächsischen Armee[The Royal Saxon Military-St. Henry Medal 1736-1918, An Honorary Journal of the Saxon Army]. Dresden: Wilhelm und Bertha von Baensch-Stiftung.
- Schulz, Andreas, and Dieter Zinke (2011). Deutschlands Generale und Admirale. (Teil V /Band 5). Die Generale der Waffen-SS und der Polizei, 1933–1945. (Schlake – Turner). Bissendorf: Biblio-Verlag. ASIN: B004OY0WY2
- Williams, Max (2018). SS Elite: The Senior Leaders of Hitler's Praetorian Guard. Vol. 3. Fonthill Media LLC. ISBN 978-1-781-55638-2.
- Yerger, Mark C. (1997). Allgemeine-SS: The Commands, Units and Leaders of the General SS. Schiffer Publishing Ltd. ISBN 0-7643-0145-4.
