= Oaths to Hitler =

Oaths of organisations in Nazi Germany

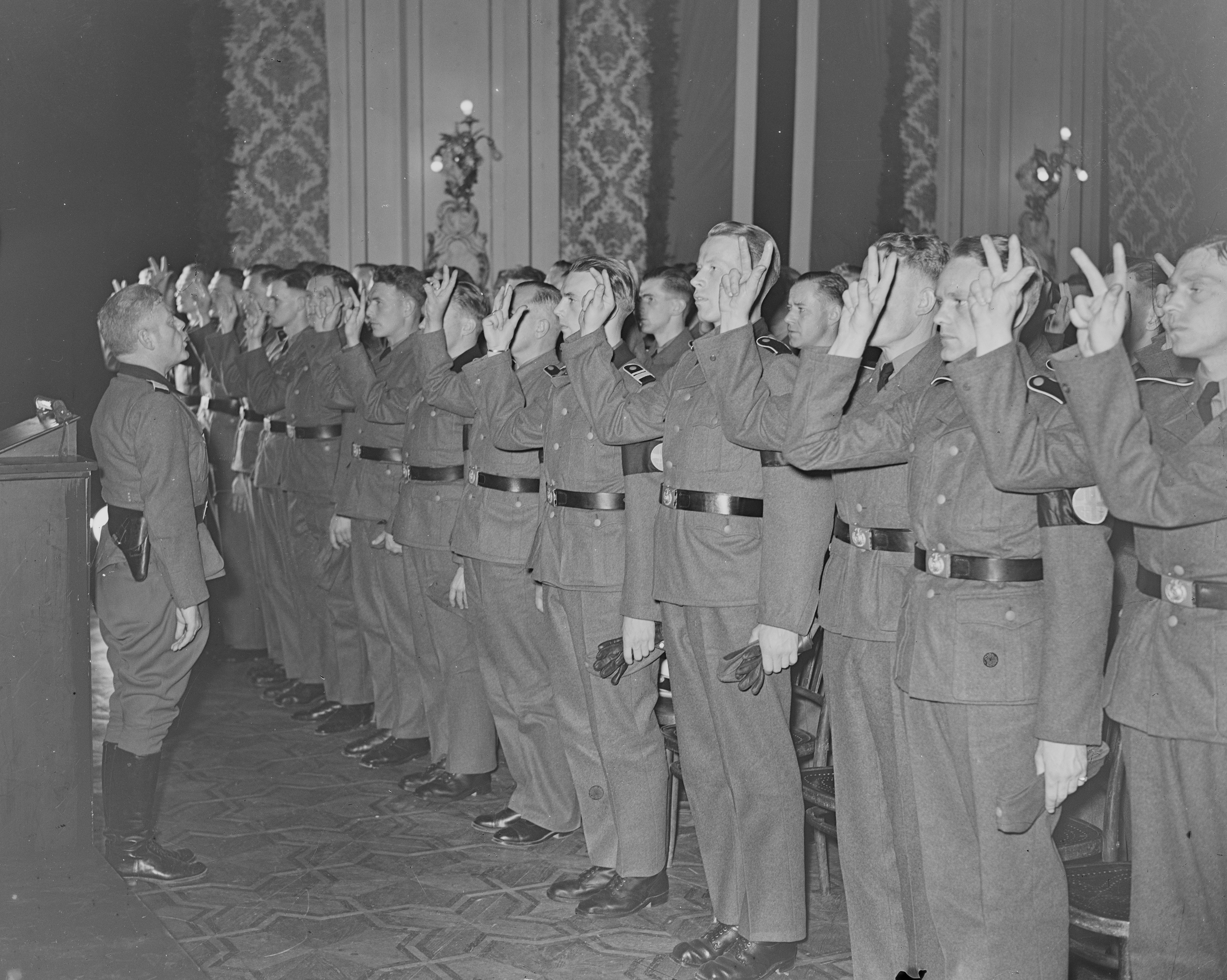
Norwegian SS members swearing an oath

Various organisations in Nazi Germany required their members to swear oaths to Adolf Hitler by name, rather than to the German state or an officeholder. Such oaths were intended to increase personal loyalty to Hitler and prevent dissent. The Hitler oath, introduced for all members of the Wehrmacht and civil servants in 1934, was one such oath. Others were sworn by members of organisations such as the Schutzstaffel (SS), whose oath may have inspired the Hitler oath, and by the Hitler Youth.

== Background ==
The most famous of the oaths to Hitler was the Hitler oath introduced to the Wehrmacht and civil service by Hitler in August 1934. Those swearing the oath promised their loyalty to Hitler in person, rather than the state or its offices, and it was intended to increase loyalty to Hitler and to prevent dissidence. Other oaths, with similar aims, were sworn by other organisations. The oath sworn to Hitler by members of the Schutzstaffel (SS) predated that of the 1934 Wehrmacht oath and may have served as an inspiration or model for it.

== SS oath ==
Members of the SS, founded by the Nazi Party in 1925, swore the following oath:

Ich schwöre Dir, Adolf Hitler, als Führer und Kanzler des Deutschen Reiches Treue und Tapferkeit. Wir geloben Dir und den von Dir bestimmten Vorgesetzten Gehorsam bis in den Tod. So wahr mir Gott helfe.

I swear to you, Adolf Hitler, as Führer and Chancellor of the German Reich, that I will be loyal and brave. I pledge obedience unto death to you and those you appoint to lead. So help me God.

The oath was renewed publicly at an annual ceremony. After 30 January 1941, foreign-born members of the SS swore to Hitler only as Führer, not as "Führer and Chancellor"; Volksdeutsche members of the SS continued to swear the original oath. SS-Gruppenführers swore a supplementary oath to adhere to Heinrich Himmler's specifications for recruits even if "it means rejecting my own children or the children of my clan... I swear by Adolf Hitler and by the honour of my ancestors — so help me God."

== Wehrmacht and civil service oath ==
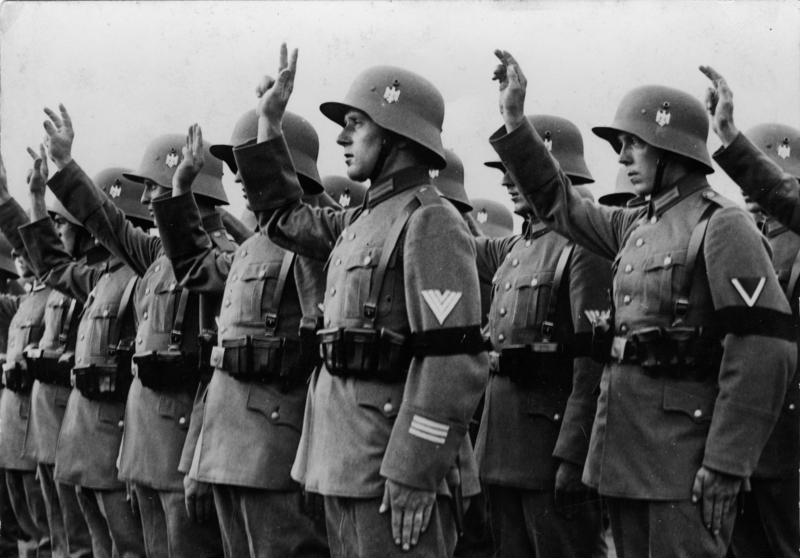
Reichswehr soldiers swearing the Hitler oath in 1934, with hands raised in the traditional schwurhand gesture

After gaining power and appointing himself head of state Hitler altered the traditional oath sworn by Wehrmacht servicemen to the state or supreme commander. The new wording of the oath, which came to be known as the Hitler oath, was to Hitler personally and was ordered to be taken by all members of the Wehrmacht. The oath was a change to that of the previous oaths which swore loyalty to the state, and not any individual, and had been sworn only by new recruits. There are some similarities between the oath and those sworn to the monarch in British and Commonwealth armies but the Nazi oath was granted more ceremony and German soldiers placed more significance upon a strict adherence to it.

The oath functioned as intended, forming a moral obstacle for any considering disobeying Hitler's orders or offering resistance to his regime. Former German officers used the oath as evidence in war crime trials after the war as part of their superior orders defence.

== Hitler Youth ==
Members of the Hitler Youth swore the following oath:

In the presence of this blood banner which represents our Führer,
I swear to devote all my energies and my strength to the saviour of our country, Adolf Hitler.
I am willing and ready to give up my life for him,
so help me God.

The oath was sworn by those entering the organisation in a ceremony held before the "blood banner" (Blutfahne), said to have been soaked in the blood of those who died in the Munich Beer Hall Putsch of 1923. The swearing of the oath has been described by German historian and former Hitler Youth member Hermann Graml as part of the "cult-like" nature of the organisation key to attracting recruits.

== Foreign volunteers ==
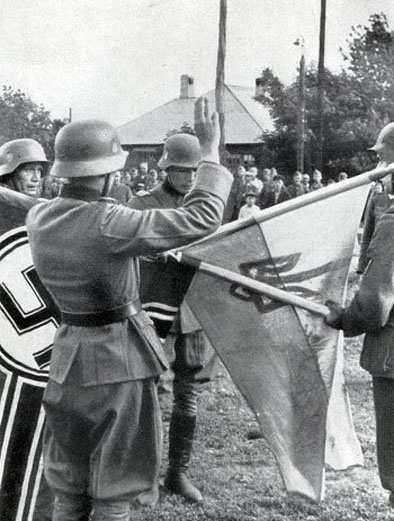
Ukrainian Liberation Army volunteers taking the Hitler oath

Like the German armed forces and civil servants, foreign volunteers and conscripts from Nazi puppet states, and occupied countries, were required to swear an oath of personal loyalty and obedience to Hitler. In some cases, foreign units were allowed to retain some scraps of national identity to make it seem that they had volunteered to join Hitler's war, not as collaborators, but as loyal patriots defending their country against Bolshevism; this was an argument many accused collaborators tried to use after the war.

The requirement could be a source of political friction in contingents which had been promised a high degree of national autonomy. Significant unrest took place among Flemish volunteers in the SS Assault Brigade "Langemarck", for example, which was required to swear an oath of allegiance in November 1943. As a result, 200 recalcitrant soldiers were removed or transferred to penal military units.

=== Oath of the Croatian volunteers of the Waffen-SS ===
I swear to the leader, Adolf Hitler, as the supreme commander of the German armed forces, loyalty, and bravery.
I pledge the leader and those superiors appointed by him, obedience until death.
I swear to God the Almighty, that l will remain loyal to the Croatian state and its authorised representative Poglavnik,
to protect the interests of the Croatian people and
I will always respect the constitution and the laws of the Croatian people.

=== Oath of the Latvian Legion ===
I swear by God this holy oath, that in the struggle against Bolshevism
I will give the supreme commander of the German armed forces, Adolf Hitler
absolute obedience, and as a fearless soldier,
I will lay down my life for this oath.

=== Oath of the Greek Security Battalions ===
I swear by God this sacred oath,
that I will obey absolutely the orders of the Supreme Commander of the German Army, Adolf Hitler.
I will with loyal dedication perform my duties and obey without condition the orders of my superiors.
I fully acknowledge that any objection to the obligations hereby accepted will lead to my punishment by the German Military Authorities.

== See also ==
- Oath of allegiance
- Vow of allegiance of the Professors of the German Universities and High-Schools to Adolf Hitler and the National Socialist State
