= Hampont =

- Commune
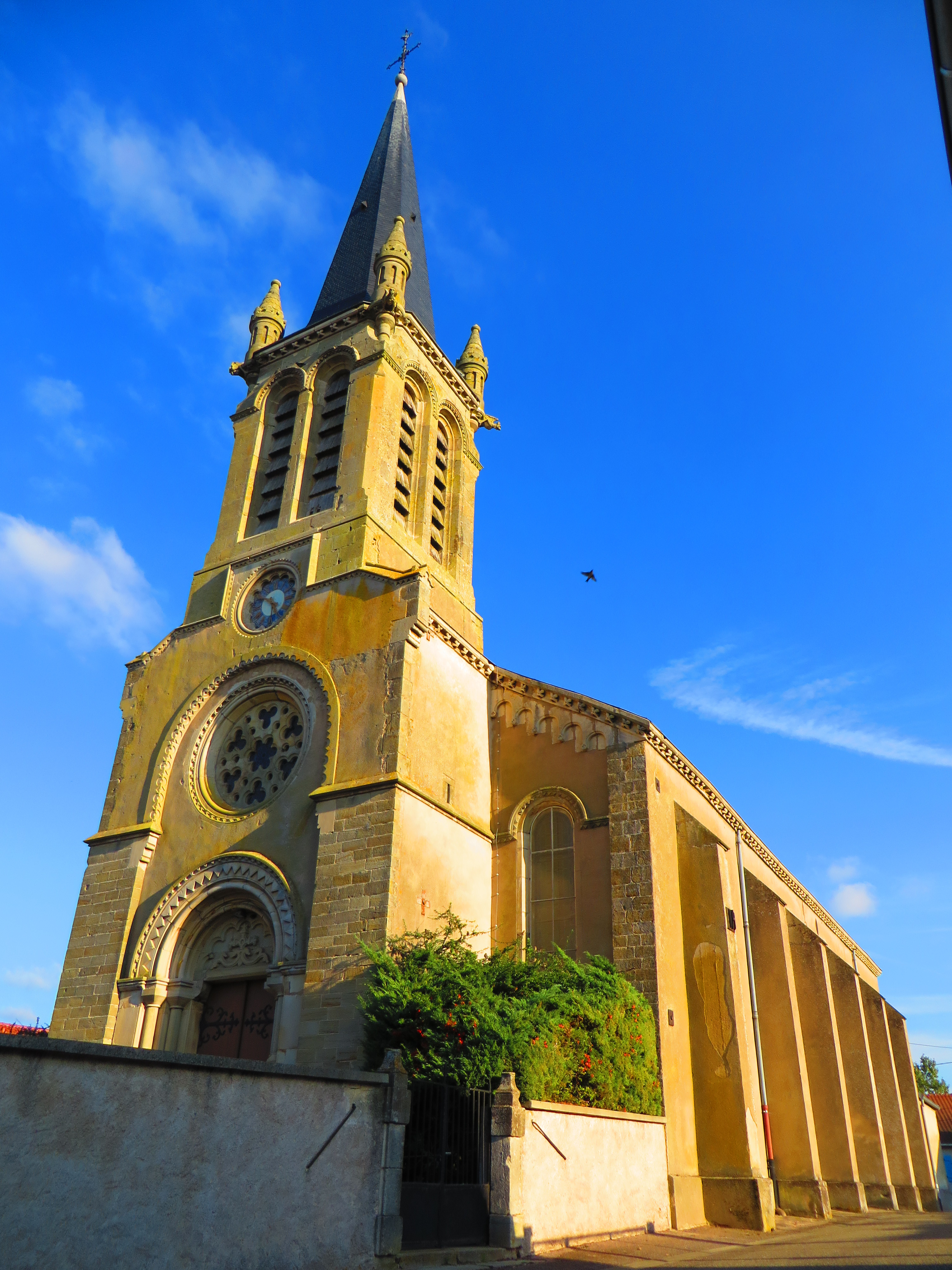
- The church in Hampont

- Coat of arms
- Location of Hampont
- Location within France Location within Grand Est
- Coordinates: 48°50′11″N 6°34′58″E
- Country: France
- Region: Grand Est
- Department: Moselle
- Arrondissement: Sarrebourg-Château-Salins
- Canton: Le Saulnois
- Intercommunality: CC du Saulnois

Government
  - Mayor (2020–2026): Sylvain Scherrer
- Area^{1}: 11.23 km^{2} (4.34 sq mi)
- Elevation: 200 m (660 ft)
- Highest elevation: 321 m (1,053 ft)
- Lowest elevation: 207 m (679 ft)
- Population (2023): 167
  - Density: 14.9/km^{2} (38.5/sq mi)
- Time zone: UTC+01:00 (CET)
  - Summer (DST): UTC+02:00 (CEST)
- INSEE/Postal code: 57290 /57170
- ^{1} French Land Register data, which excludes lakes, ponds, glaciers > 1 km^{2} (0.386 sq mi or 247 acres) and river estuaries.

Hampont (French pronunciation: [ɑ̃pɔ̃]) is a commune in the Moselle department in Grand Est in north-eastern France.

== History ==
SS-Obergruppenführer Theodor Eicke (1892–1943), second commandant of the Dachau concentration camp, was born here in 1892.

The town was formally known by the German name Hudingen between 1871 and 1918 and Hüdingen between 1940 and 1944.

== See also ==
- Communes of the Moselle department
- Parc naturel régional de Lorraine
