= Reimond Tollenaere =

Belgian fascist and SS-Untersturmführer (1909–1942)

Reimond Tollenaere (June 29, 1909 – January 22, 1942) was a member of the Vlaamsch Nationaal Verbond (VNV), a right-wing Flemish nationalist party in Belgium. He was an active collaborator with Nazi Germany during World War II.

Tollenaere became active in the Flemish nationalist movement during his law studies at the University of Ghent. He was appointed as propaganda leader of the VNV and, in 1936, became a VNV member of parliament. During the German invasion of Belgium in May 1940 he was arrested by the Belgian authorities as a potential subversive and spent some time in prison in France. After being freed following the French defeat, he resumed his political activities in Flanders.

Tollenaere was active in encouraging recruitment for the Flemish Legion attached to the Waffen-SS following the German invasion of the Soviet Union in June 1941 and later enlisted himself. He was killed by friendly fire from the Spanish Blue Division in January 1942 at Kopsy near Leningrad in the region of Veliky Novgorod. After his death, he was "cannonized" by the VNV as a political martyr.
