= Flemish Legion =

German infantry division

- Vlaams Legioen
- Sleeve insignia of the Flemish Legion, based on the traditional iconography of the Flemish Movement.
- Active: 1941–1943; 1943–1945
- Country: Belgium
- Allegiance: Nazi Germany
- Branch: Waffen-SS (Note: In its first months, the Flemish Legion was a notionally independent "legion" attached to the Waffen SS. However, in practice the unit was "from the start, an integral part" of it. The "pretence" was finally dropped in May 1943 when the unit was redesignated the SS-Sturmbrigade Langemarck.)
- Type: Infantry
- Size: Battalion, brigade and later division, though never larger than brigade-strength.
- Engagements: World War II; Eastern Front; Siege of Leningrad; Zhitomir–Berdichev Offensive; Battle of Tannenberg Line; Operation Sonnenwende

The Flemish Legion (Dutch: Vlaams Legioen, pronounced [ˈvlaːms leːɣiˈjun]) was a collaborationist military formation recruited among Dutch-speaking volunteers from German-occupied Belgium, notably from Flanders, during World War II. It was formed in the aftermath of the German invasion of the Soviet Union and fought on the Eastern Front in the Waffen SS alongside similar formations from other parts of German-occupied Western Europe.

Established in July 1941, the Flemish Legion was envisaged by the Flemish National League (Vlaamsch Nationaal Verbond, VNV) as a means of maintaining its status as the principal collaborationist party within Flanders since the German invasion of May 1940. It was formed several months after the VNV had begun recruiting Flemish volunteers for smaller Waffen SS formations and was depicted as the future army of an independent Flemish state. Amid opposition from its personnel, the roughly 1,000-strong formation was given a notionally independent status as an SS Volunteer Legion Flanders (SS-Freiwilligen Legion Flandern). It subsequently sustained heavy casualties on the Eastern Front in fighting around Leningrad.

The Flemish Legion was officially disbanded in May 1943 and reformed within the Waffen-SS as the SS Assault Brigade Langemarck (SS-Sturmbrigade Langemarck). 200 soldiers refused to swear allegiance to Adolf Hitler in October 1943 and were transferred to other units or penal units. It was subsequently reorganised on several occasions and was officially designated as a division in September 1944 but remained around 2,000-strong and never expanded beyond brigade-strength. It participated in fighting in Ukraine, Estonia, and Pomerania. Its remaining personnel finally surrendered to the Red Army at Mecklenburg on 3 May 1945.

== Background ==
=== VNV and nationalist collaboration in Flanders ===
Flag of the Flemish National League (Vlaamsch Nationaal Verbond, VNV) which emerge as the major force behind collaboration in German-occupied Flanders and drove recruitment for the Flemish Legion

There were several political parties in Belgium at the time of the German invasion in May 1940 that were broadly sympathetic to the authoritarian and anti-democratic ideals represented by Nazi Germany. In Flanders, the largest and most important of these groups was the Flemish National League (Vlaamsch Nationaal Verbond, or VNV). The VNV was the successor of the Flemish Movement which had originated as a response to the marginalisation of the Dutch language in Belgium during the 19th century. It became increasingly radical during and after World War I. VNV's ideology was framed in opposition to the Belgian state, calling for Flanders to form part of an racially defined "Greater Netherlands" (dietsland) by fusing with the Netherlands. It was also influenced by Catholicism and anti-communism but was initially distrustful of Nazi ideology which was seen as anti-clerical. Nonetheless, the VNV became increasingly influenced by fascist ideas. At national elections in April 1939, VNV received approximately 15 percent of the Flemish vote.

After the Belgian Army's surrender on 28 May 1940, a Military Administration was created to govern the German-occupied Belgium. Hoping to expand its support in Flanders and influenced by Nazi racial ideals, it adopted the so-called Flamenpolitik which gave preferential treatment to the Flemish population over the French-speaking Walloons in areas such as the repatriation of Belgian prisoners of war. The VNV hoped to use German support to expand its own political influence within Flanders. After the start of the occupation, it shifted its ideological position to be more compatible with Nazi ideas and suspended demands for Flemish secession from Belgium.

=== Early recruitment campaign ===
In the first months of the occupation, the VNV's privileged position was increasingly challenged by smaller and more radically collaborationist groups including the Algemeene-SS Vlaanderen and DeVlag which embraced Nazi ideology and were more explicitly pro-German. In September 1940, the Algemeene-SS Vlaanderen announced its intention to recruit Flemish volunteers for the Waffen-SS, initially sent to the SS-Division Wiking. This began a "race" in Flanders to recruit volunteers for the German army although the VNV was initially reluctant to join because it feared it would lose control over its recruits. In contrast with "Walloons", Flemish volunteers were considered "Nordic" in Nazi racial thinking and therefore racially suitable for the Waffen-SS rather than the German Army. Between April and June 1941, the VNV recruited 500 to 800 Flemish volunteers for a mixed Flemish-Dutch unit known as the SS-Volunteer Banner Nordwest (SS-Freiwilligen Standarte Nordwest) which the German authorities had promised would not be deployed in combat roles.

== Formation ==
The German invasion of the Soviet Union in June 1941 expanded the activities of collaborationist groups in Belgium and elsewhere in German-occupied Europe. On 8 July 1941, the VNV announced its intention to recruit a "Flemish Legion" to fight as part of the German forces on the Eastern Front. In propaganda, the Legion was depicted as the first step towards the creation of an independent Flemish army. It was advertised that the unit would be commanded by Flemish officers, and volunteers who had previously served in the Belgian Army were told that they would be able to retain past ranks and privileges. Approximately 560 men were recruited between July and August 1941. In practice, most of the recruits had been active members of the VNV. The creation of the Flemish Legion also forced the Rexist Party, a largely French-speaking group in Belgium, to recruit a "Walloon Legion" rather than the "Belgian Legion" it had originally advocated.

The volunteers were transported for training to SS-Truppenübungsplatz Heidelager near Dębica in German-occupied Poland on 3 August 1941. The first signs of dissatisfaction began to emerge as it became apparent that the unit would actually be commanded purely by Germans and that many of the other promises made during the recruitment campaign would not be kept. Discipline was harsh, and Flemish volunteers were often subject to "systematic humiliation". At the time, the Germans attempted to amalgamate the new volunteers into the Wiking formation. The majority of the new recruits refused to join the Waffen-SS and the units were instead joined into a new battalion-sized Flemish Legion, itself associated with the larger Volunteer Legion Netherlands. In practice, the autonomy of the Flemish Legion would be increasingly ignored by the German military authorities and the VNV was unable to protest without compromising its own political position.

As with some other formations at the time, the Flemish Legion was technically a "legion" attached to the Waffen-SS rather than a part of the Waffen-SS itself. According to the historian David Littlejohn, "the Germans were anxious to convey the impression of a semi-independent national unit" but the distinction was always illusory and was eventually abandoned in 1943. In practice, the Flemish Legion was effectively indistinguishable from other units of the Waffen-SS from the start and its personnel wore standard Waffen-SS uniforms with only a small shield-shaped badge depicting a Flemish lion to mark them out. In its first months, it was officially designated the SS Volunteer Legion "Flanders" (SS-Freiwilligen Legioen Flandern).

== Deployment on the Eastern Front ==
=== Battles around Leningrad ===
The Flemish Legion was declared to be battleworthy and was deployed to the sector around Leningrad in November 1941 to participate in the military blockade of the city which had begun two months earlier. It was attached to the 2 SS Infantry Brigade.

A large-scale offensive aimed to relieve Leningrad was launched by the Red Army in January 1942. The Flemish Legion was involved in heavy fighting and took significant losses. Reimond Tollenaere, a leading figure within the VNV who had enlisted in the unit, was killed in a friendly fire incident in the same month. Michael Lippert, the Legion's unpopular German commanding officer, was wounded in April 1942. He was replaced with Conrad Schellong, another German officer, who had previously served in the Wiking Division. (Note: It had initially been contemplated that Lippert would be replaced by Hans-Albert von Lettow-Vorbeck who was popular with the VNV and reputedly showed more "sensitivity" to the needs of non-German troops. Before he could assume command, he was re-assigned as a temporary commander of the Free Corps Denmark and was killed almost immediately afterwards in June 1942 and was never confirmed as the commander of the Flemish Legion.)

The Legion was withdrawn from the front in June 1942 after almost six months in combat but were re-deployed to the region again in August 1942. They were finally withdrawn from the line in March 1943 in anticipation of the unit's reorganisation.

=== Ukraine ===
Soon after arriving at Dębica, the Legion was ordered to move on to Milovice in Bohemia.

In May 1943, the Flemish Legion was amalgamated with other Flemish volunteers to form the new SS-Sturmbrigade Langemarck on the orders of Heinrich Himmler. Tensions between the Flemish volunteers and the SS, however, led to some members refusing to take the SS oath of allegiance. The Germans again insisted that the volunteers take the oath in October 1943. Some 200 "rebels" who refused were transferred to other units or penal units. In August, the VNV's leader Hendrik Elias announced that the VNV would not recruit more members for the German army. The allocation of the title Langemarck, in memory of the bloody World War I battle fought at Langemarck, West Flanders in 1914, was intended to represent Flemish-German camaraderie. However, the Flemings themselves did not understand why they had been given a title which represented the losses suffered by German soldiers trying to take over their country in 1914. The Flemings felt a jealousy that their French speaking countrymen, the Walloons, were granted as a title their home region. Despite this, significant numbers of Flemings continued to sign up for service with the Waffen-SS.

In addition to the veterans of Flandern, the Sturmbrigade now gained a contingent of new Flemish volunteers, an anti-tank Panzerjäger company, an assault gun battalion equipped with StuGs and a FlaK battalion. In October 1943, the brigade was renamed 6th SS Volunteer Sturmbrigade Langemarck. In December 1943, the Langemarck was ready to be sent to the front. The total unit strength was 2,022 men.

On 26 December 1943, Langemarck was sent to Ukraine to act as a part of Army Group South. Fighting alongside the 2nd SS Panzer Division Das Reich, the brigade participated in the heavy defensive battles in the region of Kiev and Zhitomir.

In January, 1944 the Langemarck and elements of Das Reich were encircled by Soviet forces near Zhitomir. Despite this, they fought their way out of the kessel (cauldron), suffering heavy casualties and losing the majority of their heavy equipment and vehicles. By early March, the brigade had been reduced to 400 men. At the end of April, the shattered Langemarck was ordered back to Bohemia for reforming.

=== Narva – Kurland Pocket ===
In Bohemia, 1,700 new recruits were waiting to join the division, and soon it was back up to strength. On 19 July 1944, Kampfgruppe Rehmann was formed, commanded by SS-Hauptsturmführer Wilhelm Rehmann. KG Rehmann, consisting of the Langemarck's 2nd battalion was sent to the Narva front to become a part of Felix Steiner's III (Germanic) SS Panzer Corps which was defending the Tannenberg Line. The Tannenberg Line was anchored on three strategic hills. Running west to east, these were known as Hill 69.9 (69.9-Höhe), Grenadier Hill (Grenadier-Höhe) and Orphanage Hill (Kinderheim-Höhe). From Orphanage Hill, the rear side of the town of Narva could be protected. KG Rehmann was tasked with defending Orphanage Hill.

Fighting alongside men of the 11. SS-Freiwilligen-Panzergrenadier Division Nordland, the 5th SS Volunteer Sturmbrigade Wallonien, the 20th Waffen Grenadier Division of the SS (1st Estonian), the 4th SS Volunteer Panzergrenadier Brigade Nederland and several German formations, the Langemarck was engaged in very heavy combat against the Soviets.

Over the next few months, Langemarck, along with the remainder of Steiner's Corps, executed a fighting withdrawal into the Kurland Pocket, the brigade being in combat for much of the retreat. In September 1944, the remains of KG Rehmann were evacuated by ferry over the Baltic to Swinemünde and joined the rest of the Brigade. Following the allied invasion of Belgium, many Belgian fascists fled the country to Germany. The result of this was that both the Langemarck and the 5th SS Volunteer Sturmbrigade Wallonie were redesignated as divisions on 18 October 1944.

=== Pomerania – Oder Front ===
The new Langemarck division was designated 27th SS Volunteer Grenadier Division Langemarck. While the influx of displaced Flemings meant that the division had a solid base to be formed on, it also meant that more training was required. It was not until 1 January 1945 that the division was ready to be sent back into the line. The Langemarck was once again attached to III. (Germanic) SS Panzer Corps, now a part of Steiner's newly formed XI. SS Panzer Army located on the lower Oder near Stettin.

On 16 February, a kampfgruppe with the most experienced men of the division was ordered on the offensive as a part of Operation Sonnenwende, the operation to destroy a Soviet salient and to relieve the troops besieged in the town of Arnswalde. The offensive had been conceived by Generaloberst Heinz Guderian as a massed assault all along the front, but had then been reduced by Hitler to the level of a local counterattack.

Despite initial gains, the attack soon bogged down after III. (Germanic) SS Panzer Corps, with Nordland, Langemarck and Wallonie in the vanguard, reached Arnswalde. Heavy Soviet counterattacks threatened to encircle the corps, and so after evacuating all civilian survivors, Steiner canceled the operation and ordered the corps back to the area around Stargard and Stettin.

The Soviet offensive of 1 March pushed Langemarck along with the rest of the III (Germanic) SS Panzer Corps before it. By 4 March, the division was falling back to the area around Altdamm, the last defensive position east of the Oder. On the 19th, the unit fell back behind the Oder. As a part of Steiner's XI SS Panzer Army, the Langemarck, now reduced to a Kampfgruppe, began falling back towards Mecklenburg where it surrendered to the Red Army on 8 May 1945.

== Commanders ==
- SS-Sturmbannführer Michael Lippert (24 September 1941 – 2 April 1942)
- SS-Sturmbannführer Conrad Schellong (11 July 1942 – 19 October 1944)
- SS-Oberführer Thomas Müller (19 October 1944 – 8 May 1945)

== See also ==
- Walloon Legion
- List of German divisions in World War II
- List of Waffen-SS divisions
- Ranks and insignia of the Waffen-SS
- Waffen-SS foreign volunteers and conscripts
