= Michael Lippert =

Commander in the Waffen-SS of Nazi Germany during World War II

- Born: 24 April 1897; Schönwald, Bavaria, German Empire
- Died: 1 September 1969 (aged 72); Wuppertal, West Germany
- Military career
- Allegiance: Weimar Republic; Nazi Germany
- Branch: Waffen-SS
- Service years: 1930–1945
- Rank: SS-Standartenführer
- Commands: SS-Freiwilligen Legion Flandern; SS Division Frundsberg
- Conflicts: World War II

Michael Hans Lippert (24 April 1897 – 1 September 1969) was a mid-level paramilitary commander in the Waffen-SS of Nazi Germany during World War II. He commanded several concentration camps, including Sachsenhausen, before becoming a commander of the SS-Freiwilligen Legion Flandern and the SS Division Frundsberg. He and Theodor Eicke shot and killed Sturmabteilung (SA) leader Ernst Röhm on 1 July 1934, during the Night of the Long Knives. In 1957, he was sentenced to 18 months in prison by a West German court for his part in Röhm's death.

== Career in the SS ==
Lippert joined the Nazi Party in June 1930 and the Schutzstaffel (SS) in March 1931. He became the adjutant for Theodor Eicke, who was appointed the commandant of Dachau concentration camp in 1933.

=== Execution of Ernst Röhm ===
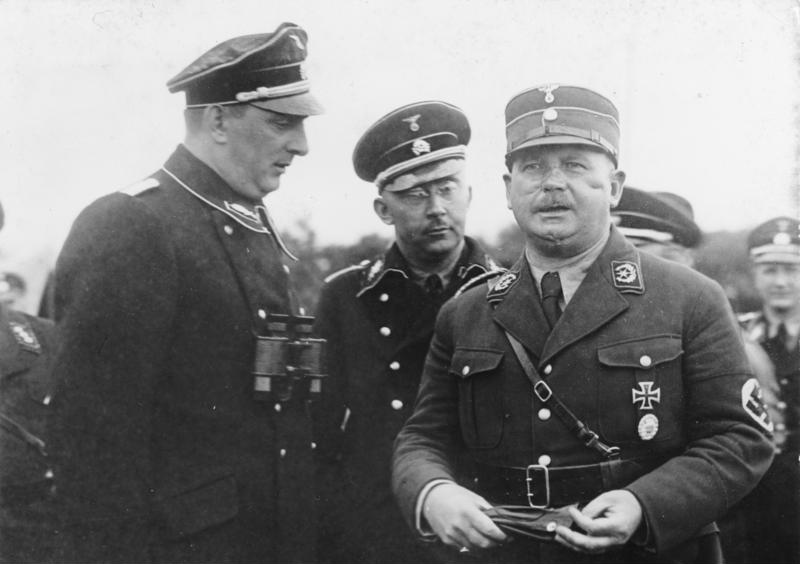
Ernst Röhm (right) with Kurt Daluege (left) and Heinrich Himmler (behind them), August 1933

In early 1934, Adolf Hitler and other Nazi leaders became concerned that Ernst Röhm, chief of the Sturmabteilung (SA), was planning a coup d'état. Hitler decided on 21 June that Röhm and the SA leadership had to be eliminated. The purge of the SA leadership and other enemies of the state began on 30 June in an action which became known as the Night of the Long Knives. Eicke, along with hand-chosen members of the SS and Gestapo, assisted Sepp Dietrich's Leibstandarte SS Adolf Hitler in the arrest and imprisonment of SA commanders, before they were shot. After Röhm was arrested, Hitler gave the order that he was to be executed. Himmler communicated Hitler's order to Eicke. Eicke was told to first give Röhm the choice to commit suicide. Accompanied by Lippert, and SS-Gruppenführer Ernst-Heinrich Schmauser, Eicke travelled to Stadelheim Prison in Munich where Röhm was being held.

After telling Röhm that he had forfeited his life and that Hitler had given him a last chance to avoid the consequences, Eicke laid a pistol on a table in Röhm's cell and told him that he had 10 minutes in which to use the weapon to kill himself. Eicke, Lippert and Schmauser left and waited in the corridor for 15 minutes, during which time no shot was heard. Finally, Eicke and Lippert drew their pistols and re-entered Röhm's cell. Both fired and Röhm fell to the floor. One of the two then crossed to Röhm and administered a coup de grâce.

== Military commands ==
Lippert became the first commanding officer of the Flemish Legion and commanded the unit in heavy fighting around the besieged city of Leningrad. His attitude towards his soldiers was "high-handed and disdainful" and he considered the Flemish to be "second-class soldiers". He was relieved of his command after being severely wounded in fighting in April 1942.

== Postwar trials ==
After his capture, Lippert was taken to England, as was customary for higher-ranking prisoners. He was later handed over to the Dutch authorities as a suspected war criminal. On 12 May 1950, Lippert was sentenced to 10 years in prison for his complicity in the executions of Dutch civilians who were found in a "restricted area" without identity papers. Two of the civilians were shot on Lippert's direct orders. Lippert served his sentence at Koepelgevangenis prison in Breda. On 17 April 1953, he was released early and deported to West Germany.

In 1956, the Munich authorities began an investigation into the Night of the Long Knives and in August arrested Lippert and Dietrich for their part in it. They were released on bail, and the trial itself did not commence until 6 May 1957. They were represented by the lawyer Alfred Seidl, who had defended Rudolf Hess at the Nuremberg Trials. Lippert and Dietrich were charged with manslaughter, in Lippert's case for the death of Röhm. Lippert asserted that he had remained outside Röhm's cell, and only Theodor Eicke had gone in. On 10 May, the case was summed-up and the prosecutor demanded a two-year sentence for Lippert. On 14 May, the president of the Court found both Lippert and Dietrich guilty and sentenced both men to 18 months in prison. He described Lippert as "filled with a dangerous and unrepentant fanaticism". Lippert died on 1 September 1969.
