= Theodor Eicke =

German SS officer (1892–1943)

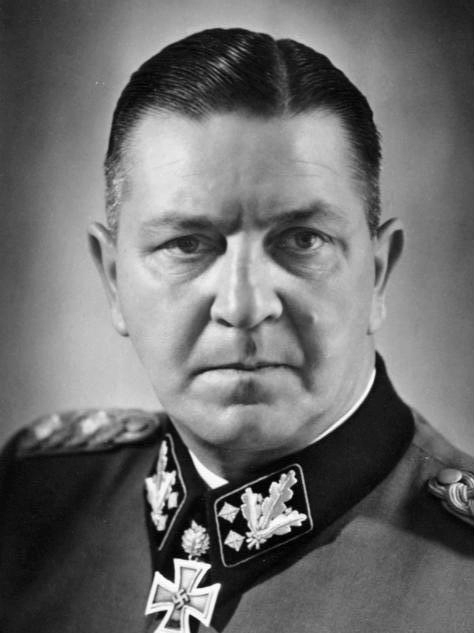
- Eicke in 1942
- Born: 17 October 1892; Hampont, Alsace–Lorraine, German Empire
- Died: 26 February 1943 (aged 50) near Lozova, Kharkov Oblast, Ukrainian Soviet Socialist Republic
- Spouse: Bertha Schwebel (m. 1914)
- Military career
- Allegiance: German Empire; Weimar Republic; Nazi Germany
- Branch: Bavarian Army; Schutzstaffel
- Service years: 1909–19 (Bavaria); 1930–1943 (SS)
- Rank: SS-Obergruppenführer
- Service number: NSDAP #114,901; SS #2,921
- Units: SS-Totenkopfverbände; Waffen-SS
- Commands: Dachau concentration camp; 3rd SS Panzer Division Totenkopf
- Conflicts: World War I; World War II; Battle of France; Operation Barbarossa; Third Battle of Kharkov (KIA)
- Awards: Knight's Cross of the Iron Cross with Oak Leaves

Theodor Eicke (17 October 1892 – 26 February 1943) was a German military officer who served as both a senior SS functionary and a Waffen-SS divisional commander in Nazi Germany. He was a key figure in the development of Nazi concentration camps. Eicke served as the second commandant of the Dachau concentration camp from June 1933 to July 1934, and together with his adjutant Michael Lippert, was one of the executioners of SA Chief Ernst Röhm during the Night of the Long Knives purge of 1934. He continued to expand and develop the concentration camp system as the first Concentration Camps Inspector.

In 1939, Eicke became commander of the SS Division Totenkopf of the Waffen-SS, leading the division during the Second World War on the Western and Eastern fronts. Eicke was killed on 26 February 1943, when his plane was shot down during the Third Battle of Kharkov.

== Early life and World War I ==
Theodor Eicke was born on 17 October 1892, in Hampont (renamed Hudingen in 1915) near Château-Salins, then in the German Reichsland (province) of Alsace-Lorraine, the youngest of 11 children in a lower middle-class family originally from Gittelda in the Harz Mountains. His father was a station master described as a German patriot. Eicke was an underachiever in school, dropping out at the age of 17 before graduation. Instead he joined the Bavarian Army (23rd Bavarian Infantry Regiment at Landau) as a volunteer, and then was transferred to the Bavarian 3rd Infantry Regiment in 1913.

Upon the start of First World War in 1914, Eicke participated in the Lorraine campaign, fighting at both the First Battle of Ypres in 1914 and the Second Battle of Ypres in 1915, and was with the 2nd Bavarian Foot Artillery Regiment at the Battle of Verdun in 1916. Eicke served as a clerk, an assistant paymaster, and a front-line infantryman, and for his bravery during the war was awarded the Iron Cross Second Class. Despite being decorated, Eicke spent most of the conflict behind the lines as a regimental paymaster.

Late in 1914, Eicke's commander had approved his request to temporarily return home on leave to marry Bertha Schwebel of Ilmenau on 26 December 1914, with whom he had two children: a daughter, Irma, on 5 April 1916 and a son, Hermann, on 4 May 1920.

Following the end of the First World War, Eicke remained as an army paymaster now in service of the Reichswehr of the Weimar Republic, until resigning from the position in 1919. Eicke began studying at a technical school in Ilmenau, but was forced to drop out shortly due to a lack of funds. From 1920, Eicke pursued a career as a police officer working for two different departments, initially as an informant and later as a regular policeman. Eicke's police career was ended in 1923 due to his open hatred for the Weimar Republic and his repeated participation in violent political demonstrations. He found work in 1923 at IG Farben in Ludwigshafen and remained there as a "security officer" until 1932.

== SS career ==
=== Nazi activism, early SS membership, and exile ===
Eicke's views on the Weimar Republic mirrored those of the Nazi Party, which he joined as member number 114,901 on 1 December 1928; he also joined the Sturmabteilung (SA), the Nazi Party's paramilitary street organization led by Ernst Röhm. Eicke left the SA by August 1930 to join the Schutzstaffel (SS) as member number 2,921, where he quickly rose in rank after recruiting new members and building up the SS organization in the Bavarian Palatinate. On 27 November 1930, Eicke was made an SS-Sturmführer and placed in command of Sturm 148 in Ludwigshafen am Rhein. As a result of his successful organizing and recruiting, he was promoted to the rank of SS-Sturmbannführer three months later. On 15 November 1931, Eicke was promoted to the rank of SS-Standartenführer (equivalent to colonel) by Heinrich Himmler, the Reichsführer of the SS.

In early 1932, his political activities caught the attention of his employer IG Farben, who subsequently terminated his employment. At the same time, he was caught preparing bomb attacks on political enemies in Bavaria for which he received a two-year prison sentence in July 1932. However, due to protection received from the Bavarian Minister of Justice Franz Gürtner, a Nazi sympathizer who would later serve as minister of justice under Adolf Hitler, Eicke was able to avoid his sentence and flee to Italy on orders from Heinrich Himmler. Italy at the time was already a fascist state under the rule of Benito Mussolini, and Eicke was promoted to the rank of SS-Oberführer and entrusted by Himmler with running a "terrorist training camp for Austrian Nazis" at Lake Garda, and once even had the privilege of "showing Italian dictator Benito Mussolini around." On 28 October 1932, he officially met with Italian Fascists in the occasion of the tenth anniversary of the March on Rome, at the newly erected Bolzano Victory Monument.

=== Return to Germany ===
In March 1933, less than three months after Hitler's rise to power, Eicke returned to Germany. Upon his return, Eicke had political quarrels with Gauleiter Joseph Bürckel, which culminated in Eicke gathering SS members loyal to himself and launching an armed putsch against Bürckel which saw Bürckel be locked in a janitor's closet by Eicke and his supporters until the local schutzpolizei intervened and arrested those involved in the putsch and secured Bürckel's release. Bürckel had Eicke arrested and detained for several months in a mental asylum in Würzburg, judged to be "mentally ill and a danger to the community". During his stay at the mental hospital, Eicke was stripped of his rank and SS membership by Himmler for having broken his word of honor. Also during the same month, Himmler set up the first official concentration camp at Dachau; Hitler had indicated his desire that this not be just another prison or detention camp. In June 1933, after the mental asylum's director informed Himmler that Eicke was not "mentally unbalanced," Himmler arranged his release, paid his family 200 Reich marks as a gift, reinstated him into the SS, and promoted him to SS-Oberführer (equivalent to senior colonel). On 26 June 1933, Himmler appointed Eicke commandant of the Dachau concentration camp after complaints and criminal proceedings were brought against the camp's first commandant, SS-Sturmbannführer Hilmar Wäckerle, following the murder of several detainees under the "guise of punishment". Eicke requested a permanent unit and Himmler granted the request, forming the SS-Wachverbände (Guard Unit).

=== Development of concentration camp system ===
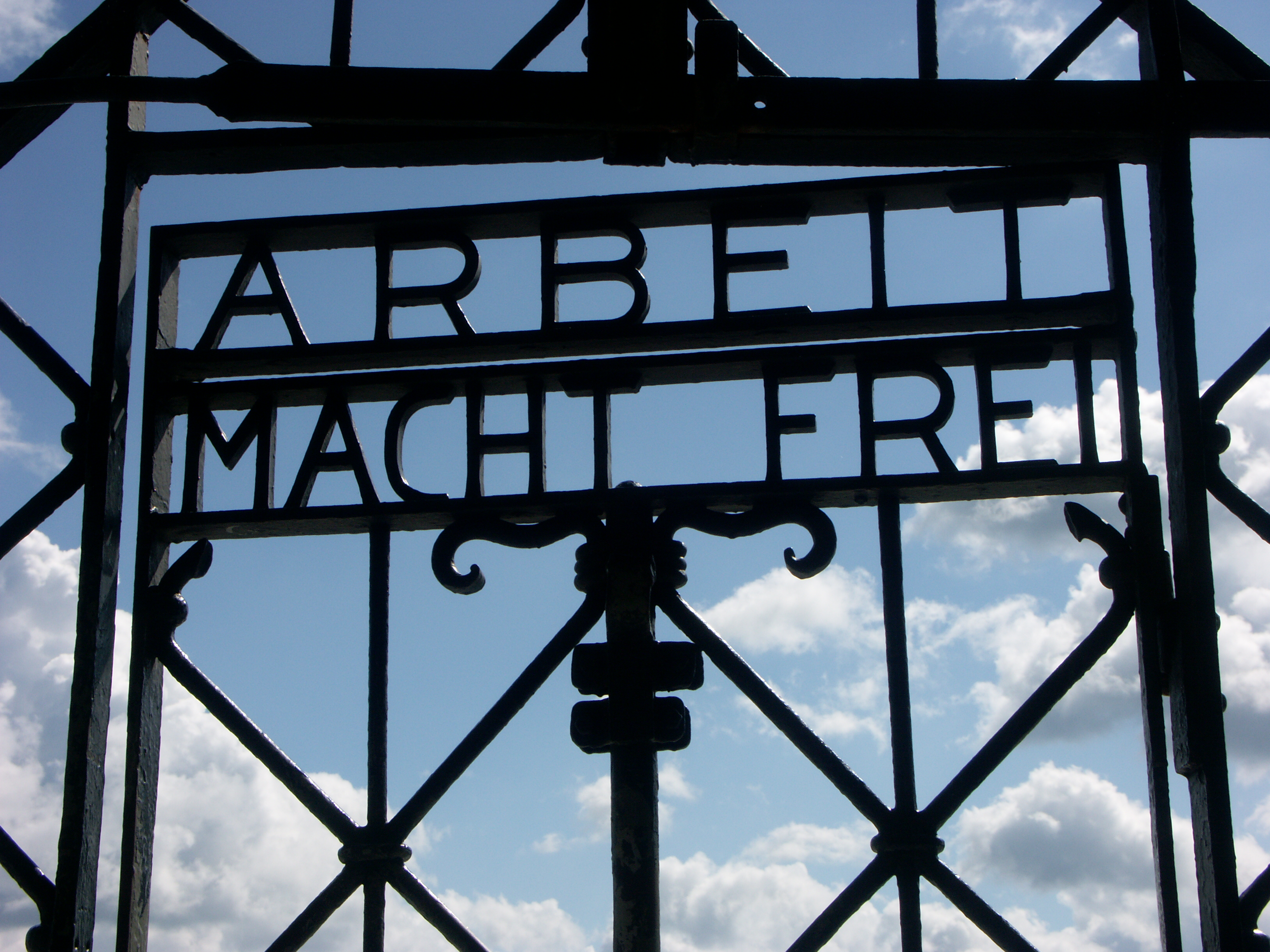
Dachau entrance gate with the Arbeit macht frei slogan commonly featured at Nazi concentration camps 48.268347°N 11.466865°E

Eicke was promoted on 30 January 1934 to SS-Brigadeführer (equivalent to Generalmajor in the German Army and a brigadier general, in the US Army), and began to extensively reorganize the Dachau camp from its original configuration under Wäckerle. Eicke fired half of the 120 guards who had been billeted at Dachau when he arrived, and devised a system that was used as a model for future camps throughout Germany. He established new guarding provisions, which included rigid discipline, total obedience to orders, and tightening disciplinary and punishment regulations for detainees.

Uniforms were issued for prisoners and guards alike, and it was Eicke who introduced the infamous blue and white striped pyjamas that came to symbolize the Nazi concentration camps across Europe. The uniforms for the guards at the camps had a special "death's head" insignia on their collars. While Eicke's reforms ended the haphazard brutality that had characterized the original camps, the new regulations were very far from humane: heavy-handed discipline, including death in some cases, was instituted for even trivial offenses. Eicke was known for his brutality, detested weakness, and instructed his men that any SS man with a soft heart should "... retire at once to a monastery". Historian Nikolaus Wachsmann asserts that while it was Himmler who established the "general direction for the later SS camp system," it was Eicke who "became its powerful motor." Eicke's antisemitism, anti-bolshevism, as well as his insistence on unconditional obedience towards him, the SS, and Hitler, made a positive impression on Himmler. By May 1934, Eicke had already styled himself as the "inspector of concentration camps" for Nazi Germany.

=== Night of the Long Knives ===
In early 1934, Hitler and other Nazi leaders became concerned that Ernst Röhm, the SA Chief of Staff, was planning a coup d'état. On 21 June, Hitler decided that Röhm and the SA leadership had to be eliminated, and on 30 June began a national purge of the SA leadership and other enemies of the state in an event that became known as the Night of the Long Knives. Eicke, along with hand-chosen members of the SS and Gestapo, assisted Sepp Dietrich's Leibstandarte SS Adolf Hitler in the arrest and imprisonment of SA commanders, before they were subsequently shot. After Röhm was arrested, Hitler gave him the choice to commit suicide or be shot. Eicke entered the cell and placed a revolver on Röhm's prison-cell table and informed him that he had "ten minutes to make good on Hitler's offer." When Röhm refused to kill himself, he was shot dead by Eicke and his adjutant, Michael Lippert, on 1 July 1934. Eicke proclaimed that he was proud for having shot Röhm, and shortly after the affair on 4 July 1934, Himmler officially named Eicke chief of the Inspektion der Konzentrationslager (Concentration Camps Inspectorate or CCI). Himmler also promoted Eicke to the rank of SS-Gruppenführer in command of the SS-Wachverbände. As a result of the Night of the Long Knives, the SA was extensively weakened, and the remaining SA-run camps were taken over by the SS. Further, in 1935, Dachau became the training center for the concentration camps service. At the March 1936 parliamentary election, Eicke was elected as a deputy to the Reichstag for electoral constituency 30, Chemnitz-Zwickau, and retained this seat until his death.

=== Camp inspector ===
In his role as the Concentration Camps Inspector, Eicke began a mass reorganisation of the camps in 1935. On 29 March 1936, the concentration camp guards and administration units were officially designated as the SS-Totenkopfverbände (SS-TV), and the introduction of forced labour made the camps one of the SS's most powerful tools. This earned him the enmity of Reinhard Heydrich, who had already unsuccessfully attempted to take control of the Dachau concentration camp in his position as chief of the Sicherheitsdienst (SD), but Eicke prevailed due to his support from Heinrich Himmler. In April 1936, Eicke was named commander of the SS-Totenkopfverbände (Death's Head Troops) and the number of men under his command increased from 2,876 to 3,222; the unit was also provided official funding through the Reich's budget office, and he was allowed to recruit future troops from the Hitler Youth based on regional needs. Ideological and military training for new recruits working the camps were both intensified under Eiche's command. The numerous smaller camps in the system were dismantled and replaced with new larger camps. Dachau concentration camp remained, then Sachsenhausen concentration camp opened in summer 1936, Buchenwald in summer 1937 and Ravensbrück (near Lichtenburg concentration camp) in May 1939. Following the Anschluss, the annexation of Austria, new camps were set up there, such as Mauthausen-Gusen concentration camp, opened in 1938. Sometime in August 1938, Eicke's entire supporting staff was moved to Oranienburg (near Sachsenhausen) where the Inspektion office would remain until 1945. Nonetheless, Eicke's role as the person designated to inspect concentration camps placed him within the framework of Heydrich's SD secret state police; whereas his command of the Death's Head units made him accountable to the Reich Security Main Office (RSHA) of the SS. All regulations for SS-run camps, both for guards and prisoners, followed the model established by Eicke at the Dachau camp.

== SS Division Totenkopf ==
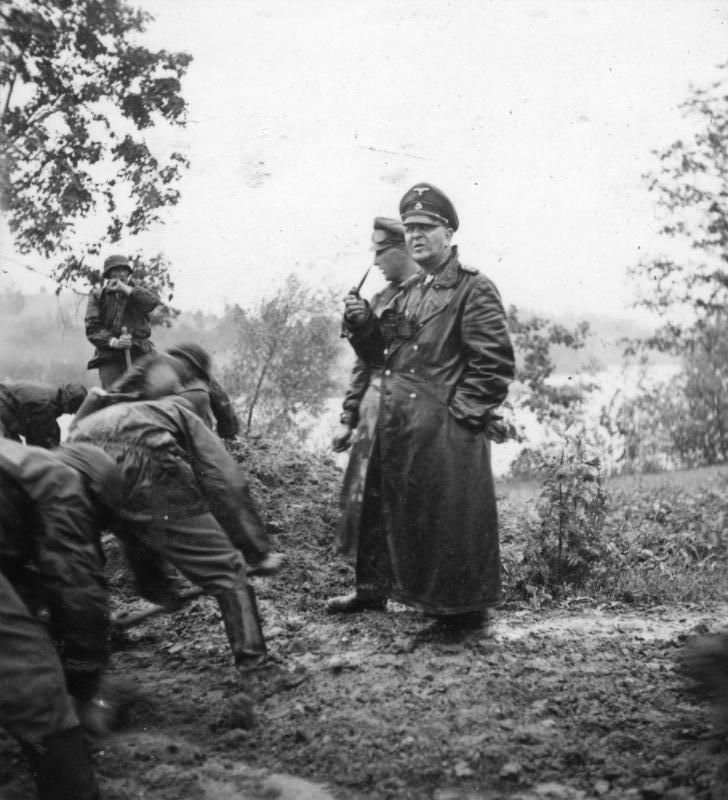
Eicke and the SS Division Totenkopf in the Soviet Union in 1941

At the beginning of World War II in 1939, the success of the Totenkopf's sister formations, the SS-Infanterie-Regiment (mot) Leibstandarte SS Adolf Hitler and the three Standarten of the SS-Verfügungstruppe (SS-VT) led to the creation of two additional Waffen-SS divisions by October 1939. Eicke was given command of a new division, the SS Division Totenkopf, which was formed from concentration camp guards of the 1st (Oberbayern), 2nd (Brandenburg) and 3rd (Thüringen) Standarten (regiments) of the SS-Totenkopfverbände, and soldiers from the SS Heimwehr Danzig. At the time, Eicke had no experience in leading troops into combat; historian Robert Forczyk attributed his appointment solely to his fanatical loyalty to the Nazi Party.

After Eicke was assigned to combat duty, his deputy Richard Glücks was appointed the new CCI chief by Himmler. By 1940, the CCI came under the administrative control of the SS-Hauptamt Verwaltung und Wirtschaft (SS Office [for] Administration and Business) which was set up under Oswald Pohl. In 1942, the CCI became Amt D (Office D) of the consolidated SS-Wirtschafts-Verwaltungshauptamt (SS Economic and Administrative Department; WVHA) also under Pohl. Therefore, the entire concentration camp system was placed under the authority of the WVHA with the Inspector of Concentration Camps now a subordinate to the Chief of the WVHA. Pohl assured Eicke that the command structure he had introduced would not fall to the jurisdiction of the Gestapo or SD. The CCI and later Amt D were subordinate to the SD and Gestapo only in regards to who was admitted to the camps and who was released, and what happened inside the camps was under the command of Amt D.

The SS Division Totenkopf, also known as the Totenkopf Division, went on to become one of the most effective German formations on the Eastern Front. Under Eicke's command, it fought during invasion of the Soviet Union in 1941, as well as the summer offensive in 1942, the capture of Kharkov, in the Demyansk Pocket, and the Third Battle of Kharkov. During the course of the war, Eicke and his division became known for their brutality and war crimes, including the murder of 97 British POWs in Le Paradis, France, in 1940, while serving on the Western Front. The division was also known for the frequent murder of captured Soviet soldiers and the widespread pillaging of Soviet villages. Forczyk argued that the Totenkopf Division's effectiveness had nothing to do with Eicke's leadership, describing him as "a thug with no real military skill," whose only notable quality in combat was his "willingness to obey any order, no matter how criminal".

Eicke's only son, Hermann, served under his command and was killed in action on 21 September 1941.

== Death ==
Eicke was killed around 4:30pm on 26 February 1943, during the opening stages of the Third Battle of Kharkov, when his Fieseler Fi 156 Storch reconnaissance aircraft was shot down between the villages of Artil'ne and Mykolaivka, 105 kilometers (65 mi) south of Kharkov near Lozova by Red Army anti-aircraft artillery and small arms fire. Eicke was portrayed in the Axis press as a hero and soon after his death, one of the Totenkopf's infantry regiments received the cuff title "Theodor Eicke" in remembrance of him. Eicke was first buried at a German military cemetery near the village of Oddykhne (Оддихне) in the Kharkiv Oblast, Ukraine. When the Germans were forced to retreat as the Red Army counter-attacked, Himmler had Eicke's body moved to a cemetery in Hegewald south of Zhitomir in Ukraine. Eicke's body remained in Ukraine, where it was likely bulldozed by Soviet forces, since it was customary for them to destroy German graves.

== Awards ==
- Iron Cross (1914) 2nd Class
- Clasp to the Iron Cross (1939) 2nd Class (26 May 1940)
- Iron Cross (1939) 1st Class (31 May 1940)
- Knight's Cross of the Iron Cross with Oak Leaves
  - Knight's Cross on 26 December 1941 as SS-Gruppenführer and Generalleutnant of the Waffen-SS and commander of SS-Division "Totenkopf"
  - 88th Oak Leaves on 20 April 1942 as SS-Obergruppenführer and General of the Waffen-SS and commander of SS-"Totenkopf" Division
- Wound Badge in Silver

== Sources ==
- Breitman, Richard (1991). The Architect of Genocide: Himmler and the Final Solution. New York: Alfred A. Knopf. ISBN 978-0-39456-841-6.
- Broszat, Martin (1968). "The Concentration Camps, 1933–45". In Krausnick, Helmut; Buchheim, Hans; Broszat, Martin; Jacobsen, Hans-Adolf (eds.). Anatomy of the SS State. New York: Walker and Company. ISBN 978-0-00211-026-6.
- Buchheim, Hans (1968). "The SS – Instrument of Domination". In Krausnick, Helmut; Buchheim, Hans; Broszat, Martin; Jacobsen, Hans-Adolf (eds.). Anatomy of the SS State. New York: Walker and Company. ISBN 978-0-00211-026-6.
- Childers, Thomas (2017). The Third Reich: A History of Nazi Germany. New York: Simon & Schuster. ISBN 978-1-45165-113-3.
- Cooper, D. (22 February 2004). "WW2 People's War: Le Paradis: The murder of 97 soldiers in a French field on the 26/27th May 1940". BBC Online.
- Dams, Carsten; Stolle, Michael (2014). The Gestapo: Power and Terror in the Third Reich. Oxford and New York: Oxford University Press. ISBN 978-0-19-966921-9.
- Evans, Richard J. (2003). The Coming of the Third Reich. New York: Penguin Group. ISBN 978-0-14-303469-8.
- Evans, Richard J. (2005). The Third Reich in Power. New York: Penguin Group. ISBN 978-0-14-303790-3.
- Fellgiebel, Walther-Peer (2000) [1986]. Die Träger des Ritterkreuzes des Eisernen Kreuzes 1939–1945 – Die Inhaber der höchsten Auszeichnung des Zweiten Weltkrieges aller Wehrmachtteile [The Bearers of the Knight's Cross of the Iron Cross 1939–1945 – The Owners of the Highest Award of the Second World War of all Wehrmacht Branches] (in German). Friedberg, Germany: Podzun-Pallas. ISBN 978-3-7909-0284-6.
- Flaherty, T. H. (2004) [1988]. The Third Reich: The SS. Time-Life. ISBN 1-84447-073-3.
- Forczyk, Robert (2012). Demyansk 1942–43: The Frozen Fortress. Oxford: Osprey Publishing. ISBN 978-1849085526.
- Gilbert, Adrian (2019). Waffen-SS: Hitler's Army at War. New York: Da Capo Press. ISBN 978-0-30682-465-4.
- Hamilton, Charles (1984). Leaders & Personalities of the Third Reich, Vol. 1. R. James Bender Publishing. ISBN 0912138270.
- Kershaw, Ian (2008). Hitler: A Biography. New York: W. W. Norton & Company. ISBN 978-0-393-06757-6.
- Koehl, Robert (2004). The SS: A History 1919–45. Stroud: Tempus. ISBN 978-0-75242-559-7.
- Longerich, Peter (2012). Heinrich Himmler. Oxford and New York: Oxford University Press. ISBN 978-0199592326.
- McNab, Chris (2009). The SS: 1923–1945. Amber Books Ltd. ISBN 978-1-906626-49-5.
- Miller, Michael (2006). Leaders of the SS and German Police, Vol. 1. R. James Bender Publishing. ISBN 9-32970-037-3.
- Mitcham, Samuel W. Jr.; Mueller, Gene (2012). Hitler's Commanders: Officers of the Wehrmacht, the Luftwaffe, the Kriegsmarine, and the Waffen-SS. Lanham, MD: Rowman & Littlefield. ISBN 978-1-44221-153-7.
- Obermair, Hannes (2017). "Monuments and the City – an almost inextricable entanglement". In Matthias Fink; et al. (eds.). Multiple Identitäten in einer "glokalen Welt" – Identità multiple in un "mondo glocale" – Multiple identities in a "glocal world". Bozen-Bolzano: Eurac Research. pp. 88–99. ISBN 978-88-98857-35-7.
- Padfield, Peter (2001) [1990]. Himmler: Reichsführer-SS. London: Cassel & Co. ISBN 0-304-35839-8.
- Reichstag Members Database. "Datenbank der deutschen Parlamentsabgeordneten: Theodor Eicke" [Database of German Members of Parliament: Theodor Eicke]. Datenbank der deutschen Parlamentsabgeordneten (in German).
- Rees, Laurence (2017). The Holocaust: A New History. New York: PublicAffairs. ISBN 978-1-61039-844-2.
- Ripley, Tim (2004). The Waffen-SS at War: Hitler's Praetorians 1925–1945. Zenith Press. ISBN 978-1-86227-248-4.
- Sofsky, Wolfgang (1997). The Order of Terror: The Concentration Camp. Princeton, NJ: Princeton University Press. ISBN 978-0-69100-685-7.
- Stein, George (1984) [1966]. The Waffen-SS: Hitler's Elite Guard at War 1939–1945. Ithaca, N.Y.: Cornell University Press. ISBN 978-0-8014-9275-4.
- Sydnor, Charles (1977). Soldiers of Destruction: The SS Death's Head Division, 1933–1945. Princeton, NJ: Princeton University Press. ASIN B001Y18PZ6.
- Thomas, Franz (1997). Die Eichenlaubträger 1939–1945 Band 1: A–K [The Oak Leaves Bearers 1939–1945 Volume 1: A–K] (in German). Osnabrück, Germany: Biblio-Verlag. ISBN 978-3-7648-2299-6.
- Wachsmann, Nikolaus (2015). KL: A History of the Nazi Concentration Camps. New York: Farrar, Straus and Giroux. ISBN 978-0-37411-825-9.
- Weale, Adrian (2012). Army of Evil: A History of the SS. New York; Toronto: NAL Caliber (Penguin Group). ISBN 978-0-451-23791-0.
- Williams, Max (2001). Reinhard Heydrich: The Biography, Volume 1 – Road To War. Church Stretton: Ulric Publishing. ISBN 978-0-9537577-5-6.

Military offices
Preceded by SS-Standartenführer Hilmar Wäckerle	Commander of Dachau concentration camp 26 June 1933 – 4 July 1934	Succeeded by SS-Oberführer Alexander Reiner
Preceded by none	Commander of SS Division Totenkopf; 14 November 1939 – 6 July 1941	Succeeded by SS-Obergruppenführer Matthias Kleinheisterkamp
Preceded by SS-Obergruppenführer Georg Keppler	Commander of SS Division Totenkopf; 21 September 1941 – 26 February 1943	Succeeded by SS-Obergruppenführer Hermann Prieß
