= Himmler (surname) =

Himmler is a German surname. Notable people with the surname include:

- Ernst Hermann Himmler (1905–1945), German Nazi functionary and younger brother of Heinrich Himmler
- Gebhard Ludwig Himmler (1898–1982), German Nazi functionary and older brother of Heinrich Himmler
- Gudrun Burwitz, née Himmler (1929–2018), daughter of Heinrich Himmler
- Heinrich Himmler (1900–1945), Reichsführer of the Schutzstaffel (SS), a military commander, and a leading member of the Nazi Party (NSDAP) of Nazi Germany
- Katrin Himmler (born 1967), a German author, the granddaughter of Ernst Hermann Himmler, great-niece of Heinrich Himmler
- Margarete Himmler (1893–1967), wife of Heinrich Himmler

== See also ==
- Operation Himmler (less often known as: Operation Konserve, Operation Canned Goods), a Nazi Germany false flag project
