= Richard Wendler =

German Nazi official (1898–1972)

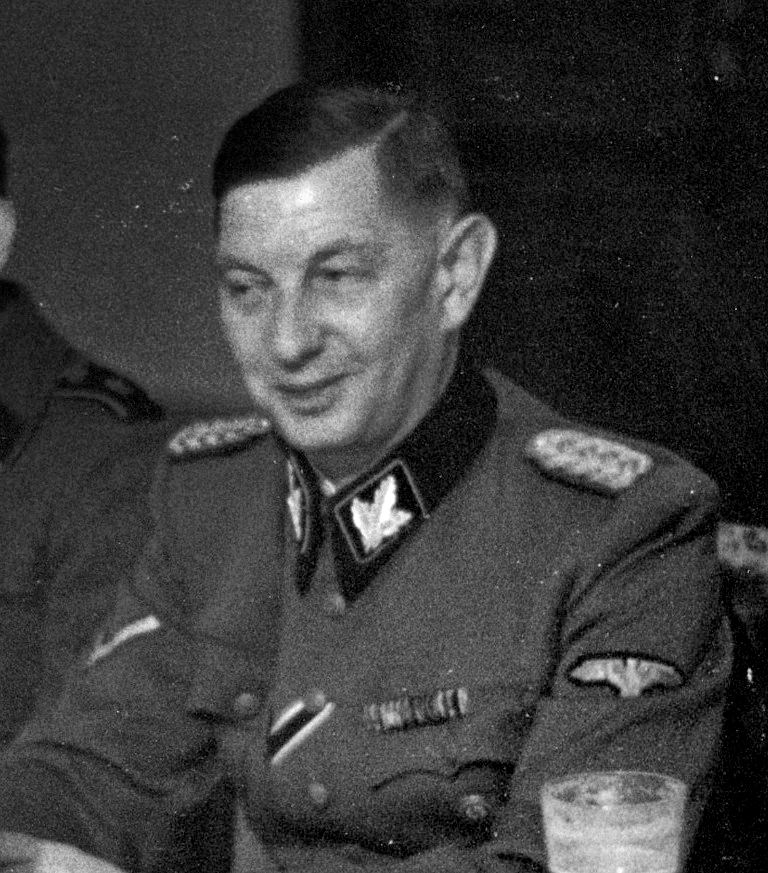
- Born: 22 January 1898; Oberndorf bei Salzburg, German Empire
- Died: 24 August 1972 (aged 74); Prien am Chiemsee, West Germany
- Title: SS-Gruppenführer and Generalleutnant of Police
- Political party: Nazi Party
- Criminal charges: War crimes, crimes against humanity

Richard Wendler (22 January 1898 – 24 August 1972) was a high-ranking Nazi official during World War II. During the occupation of Poland, he was the Governor of new District Lublin in the General Government, in charge of Lublin concentration camp and the creation of the Częstochowa Ghetto, among others. Before his deployment to Poland, he was the mayor of the city Hof between 1933 and 1941 and became an SS-Gruppenführer in 1942 during the murderous Operation Reinhard. Wendler's sister was married to a brother of Reichsführer-SS Heinrich Himmler.

== Biography ==
Wendler was born the son of a border official, in southeast Bavaria, near the border with Austria. He attended elementary school in Bad Reichenhall and the humanist Ludwigsgymnasium in Munich. Wendler was a soldier during the First World War, reaching the rank of Unteroffizier. From the spring of 1919, he was a member of the Freikorps and participated in the fight against the Bavarian Soviet Republic in 1919 and the suppression of the Ruhr Uprising in 1920. He studied jurisprudence and political science from 1918 to 1922 at the Ludwig-Maximilians-Universität München, where he received his doctorate of jurisprudence. From 1924, he worked as general counsel in Stuttgart, and completed his studies with his second Staatsexamen in 1925. Until 1927, he was the Counsel for Industry (Justitiar in der Industrie) and was a practicing lawyer in Deggendorf.

His sister Mathilde (called Hilde) married Gebhard Ludwig Himmler, the older brother of the Reichsführer-SS Heinrich Himmler in 1926. Wendler, who founded the local NSDAP group in Deggendorf in 1927, joined the Nazi Party (membership number 93,116) and the SA on 1 July 1928. In early April 1933, as a Sturmbannführer with the SA, he joined the SS (membership number 36,050). He was appointed to the Bavarian Political Police by Himmler. In April 1934, he rose to SS-Obersturmbannführer, to SS-Standartenführer in April 1935, and SS-Gruppenführer in 1941. In early August 1941, he was promoted to Generalmajor der Polizei und SS-Brigadeführer. On 21 July 1943, he was appointed SS-Gruppenführer und Generalleutnant der Polizei.

On 6 October 1933 he was elected Lord Mayor of Hof. He was involved in the demolition of the Jewish Synagogue in Hof, during Kristallnacht in November 1938. Wendler resigned from the office of mayor in 1941.

After the beginning of World War II, Wendler was the city commissioner in Kielce. In September 1939, he served as Stadtkommisasar in Kielce until he was made Stadthauptmann of Częstochowa in December 1939. In 1940, he took over the same position in Radom, and in this capacity, ordered, among other things, the installation of a ghetto in Częstochowa. From 31 January 1942 to 26 May 1943, he was the governor of the district of Kraków. Thereafter, until 22 July 1944, he was governor of the Lublin district, after which he fled from the advancing Red Army.

In May 1945, he fell into American captivity and went by the false name Kummermehr while there. For this reason, Wendler was not transferred to Poland, but rather released from Allied internment in September 1945. Afterwards, he worked as a construction worker. On 3 August 1948, he was arrested and imprisoned by a Denazification court. On 22 December 1948, as a "Hauptschuldige" (Group I – Major Offender), he was sentenced to four years in a labor camp. In April 1949, the sentence was reduced to three years in prison. During the process, Wendler denied any knowledge of the deportations of Jews. On 12 September 1952, he was classified as "Belastete" (Group 2 – Offender). He was classified as a "Mitläufer" (Group 4 – Follower) by pardon of Bavarian Minister-President Wilhelm Hoegner on 28 October 1955, and thereby was able to again obtain admission to the bar in Munich in 1955. The State Prosecutor in Munich stopped proceedings against Wendler on 1 July 1966, and further preliminary investigation ceased on 5 October 1970. He died in August 1972.

== Brief Role in Częstochowa Ghetto ==
As city commissioner and SS-Brigadeführer, Wendler established the Częstochowa Ghetto. The area chosen to house the ghetto was in the eastern and oldest portion of Częstochowa. The ghetto was officially sealed off from the rest of Częstochowa on 23 August 1940. The initial population was that of 30,000 Jews, although the unseemly slum could hardly sustain a population a quarter of the size. Unlike other ghettos, the Częstochowa Ghetto was not enclosed by fence, and it was possible to access non-Jewish areas of the city from it. Additionally, unlike other ghettos, the Aryan population was allowed to pass through the ghetto, and certain shops were allowed to remain open, allowing for a limited amount of goods to be kept in circulation. However, if Poles or other non-Jews were spotted purchasing goods from the Jewish vendors, policemen were ordered to remove them, and sometimes would even steal the merchandise for themselves. The ghetto would eventually be liquidated from 22 September to 8 October 1942, while Wendler was adjusting to his role in the Kraków District.

== Duties and Operations (Aktionen) in Kraków District (1942–43) ==
Prior to Operation Barbarossa, the General Government was divided into four districts, one of which was named after the Polish urban center of Kraków. From its inception until 31 January 1942, the Kraków District was overseen by Otto Wächter, who reported to Governor-General Hans Frank. After Operation Barbarossa had begun, however, a fifth district was created, Galicia, to which Wächter was transferred. Consequently, Wendler, at that time an SS Major General, was made Governor. Wendler, a longtime Nazi party member who had also been active in the SD, had an established rapport with ranking Nazi officials, most notably his brother-in-law Heinrich Himmler. This, in addition to his formal education in jurisprudence and political science and his experience as a lawyer and mayor made him an unsurprising choice for Governor of the district.

Like his predecessor, Wendler reported to Hans Frank and aided in fulfilling the Governor-General's intentions, which primarily focused on the implementation of Aryanization policies. A major effect of these policies in the Kraków District was the creation of ghettos; this was primarily due to the urban environment of the city of Kraków, the capital of the General Government. Between October 1941 and February 1942, 25 ghettos were integrated into the district, in addition to several already in existence. German data from 1940 suggests that there were over 200,000 Jews in the District, however, it is likely this is an underestimate that neglects to include large numbers of refugees who came from other areas of Poland in 1939 as the result of German occupation.

In addition to reporting to the Governor-General, District General Wendler oversaw the SS and Police Leader (SSPF), the preeminent police official of the District. The SSPF, and naturally, the Security Police and Gestapo, were Wendler's primary instruments of enforcement in the ghettos of the Kraków District. As the result of policies designed to keep Jews in the ghetto and non-Jews out (in 1942), basic necessities became hard to come by, causing a black market to occur between the isolated Jews and nearby villagers. Subsequently, cruel enforcement and violence by the SSPF's Security Police and the Gestapo became more common. Many of these heinous instances were referred to officially as "Aktions." One such Aktion in February 1942 involved the killing by the Security Police of about 50 Jews returning (with official discretion) from Eastern Galicia and one of similar circumstance occurred just a few weeks later, the justification being that these Jews were under suspicion due to the fact that they had previously lived under the rule of the Soviets. In March 1942 another Aktion occurred resulting in the deaths of 500 people, the designation of 750 people to be placed in the camp at Putskow, and the deportation of 3,000 to a variety of towns in the Lublin District. On 13 July 1942, Governor Wendler expressed immense praise for one of his henchmen, Kreishauptman Ehaus (who was responsible for Kreis Rzeszów/Reichshof in the District), who had successfully made the Kreis almost entirely "judenfrei" (free of Jews) via shooting Aktions coordinated with the Security Police. The first of his underlings to make a Kreis "judenfrei", however, was one of Wendler's close friends, Walter Gentz, the Kreishauptman of Kreis Jasło. Gentz was notorious for his infamously harsh anti-Jewish policy and visible drive to make his Kreis free of Jews ahead of any of his contemporaries.

As time progressed, Aktions by the SSPF and the Security Police veered from immediate, on-sight, senseless murder to deportation. The primary surge of these deportation-based Aktions in the Kraków District occurred between 1 June and mid-September 1942, all of which had the final destination of the Belzec extermination center. The first of these major deportation Aktions from the Kraków ghetto took place from 1 to 8 June 1942, followed by deportations in the town of Slomniki and the Tarnow ghetto. After these deportations by Governor Wendler's men, the remaining majority of the District's Jewish population was removed Kreis (equivalent to a county; 12 originally in the District) by Kreis, in the following order: Reichshof and Debica (July); Jaroslau, Krosno, Jaslo, Neu-Sandez, Neumarkt, and Krakau-Land (August); Miechow, Sanok, and Tarnow (September). An additional large-scale deportation Aktion by the SSPF and his cohorts took place in October that year, and the remaining small ghettos were cleared the following month. Additionally, while in the process of being deported, able-bodied Jews were selected and sent to labor camps and those who had connections to the Jewish Police or the Judenrate were often chosen to remain in the ghettos to sort through Jewish belongings.

According to the Korherr Report, as a result of the Aktions carried out by Wendler's underlings, as of 31 December 1942 only about 37,000 of the previously conservative estimate of 200,000 Jews remained in the Kraków District. In January 1943, Wendler attended a police conference in Kraków. At the conference, Wendler spoke with great satisfaction about his excellent cooperation with the SSPF in the Kraków District and mentioned that the "Judenaktion (Jewish Operation) took place without great unrest."

== See also ==
- List SS-Gruppenführer

== Bibliography ==
- Jörg Wurdack: Dr. Richard Wendler; Oberbürgermeister Hofs und Mittäter bei der „Endlösung“ im besetzten Polen. In: Miscellanea curiensia. VII, Hof 2008, ISBN 978-3-928626-57-6, p. 99–133. (56. Bericht des Nordoberfränkischen Vereins für Natur-, Geschichts- und Landeskunde)
- Katrin Himmler, The Himmler Brothers. Macmillan, London, 2007, ISBN 978-0-330-44814-7.
- Bogdan Musial: Deutsche Zivilverwaltung und Judenverfolgung im Generalgouvernement. Harrassowitz, Wiesbaden 1999, ISBN 3-447-04208-7. (second unrevised edition, Harrassowitz, 2004, ISBN 3-447-05063-2)
- Werner Präg, Wolfgang Jacobmeyer (Hrsg.): Das Diensttagebuch des deutschen Generalgouverneurs in Polen 1939–1945. Stuttgart 1975, ISBN 3-421-01700-X (Veröffentlichungen des Instituts für Zeitgeschichte, Quellen und Darstellungen zur Zeitgeschichte Band 20).
- Markus Roth: Herrenmenschen. Die deutschen Kreishauptleute im besetzten Polen – Karrierewege, Herrschaftspraxis und Nachgeschichte. Wallstein Verlag, Göttingen 2009, ISBN 978-3-8353-0477-2.
