= Himmler–Kersten Agreement =

1945 pledges by Himmler

The Himmler–Kersten Agreement was a document signed on 12 March 1945 by Reichsführer-SS Heinrich Himmler and his personal physician Felix Kersten, in which Himmler made four pledges 'in the name of humanity' concerning the fate of Nazi concentration camps upon the approach of Allied forces at the end of the Second World War.

The four points of the agreement were that on the approach of Allied forces:

1. The concentration camps would not be destroyed
2. A white flag would be flown and control of concentration camps handed over to the Allies
3. The killing of Jews would be ceased and Jews treated equally to other prisoners
4. The inmates would not be evacuated and Sweden would be allowed to send food parcels to individual Jewish prisoners

The document was signed in secret, in the presence only of Himmler's secretary Rudolf Brandt, in a room at the Hohenlychen Sanatorium.

This agreement saved the lives of 60,000 Jews as well as more than 15,000 people who were rescued during the White Buses operations in March–April 1945.
