= Heinrich Himmler papers =

Collection of Diaries from Heinrich Himmler

The Heinrich Himmler papers are a collection of papers held by the Hoover Institution at Stanford University. Some limited items from the collection were digitized for the first time in 2017 including two photo albums with photos from Himmler's travels in Germany and Nazi occupied Poland. Though most of the papers were stored at Stanford University, some of these papers were discovered in Tel Aviv in 2014.

== Background ==
By 1959 the National Archives had amassed a growing collection of microfilm of materials documenting Nazi rule in Germany and other European countries. The original documents, collected by allied forces, were divided among the US, France and Britain. The Hoover Institution was one of the depositories for these documents. The Himmler papers collection is made up of correspondences, telegrams, cables, memoranda and other documents.

== Early diaries ==
The early diaries were found in Himmler's villa at Gmünd by a GI who sold them to an American intelligence official in Bavaria. According to Himmler's housekeeper, these six diaries were reported to be the only surviving volumes of Himmler's diaries, but this proved to be incorrect, as another diary of Himmler's vacations (1910-1913) was found, and official journals of the 1930s and 1940s. These ended up in American hands at the Document Center in Berlin, Germany. Also among the documents were letters, party records and other miscellaneous papers. The six diaries were eventually turned over to the Hoover Institution and microfilmed. The authenticity of the papers has been established. The diaries were acquired for the Hoover Institution's archives by curator Agnes Discher Peterson.

=== 1914–1916 ===
Entries from 1914, written when Himmler was 14 years old, record his interest in the military developments of World War I, containing records of official army bulletins and information from Münchner Neueste Nachrichten. He leaves the farm for university after becoming sick. During his illness he reads a polemic directed against Freemasons. Written by Friedrich Wichtl, the polemic blamed freemasons for the outcome of World War I and claimed a strong Jewish influence in freemasonry. Himmler notes in his diary "A book that sheds light on everything and tells us who we have to fight first," but does not say whether he means Jews or Freemasons. There are fewer entries in the later months of 1914, and very few between September 1915 and June 14, 1916. There are no entries during the German Revolution of 1918–1919 of the Bavarian Soviet Republic.

=== 1919 ===
The entries resume in August 1919 concerning his chores on a farm in Ingolstadt and stating his desire to become a farmer. The first mention of Jews from Himmler's extant diaries is from 15 December 1919, during his first semester at university, written after he joined the League of Apollo:

After dinner, I had a conversation ... about Jewishness, questions of honour and so on. A very interesting discussion. I was thinking about it on the way home. I think I am heading for conflict with my religion. Whatever happens I shall always love God and pray to him, and belong to the Catholic Church and defend it, even if I should be excluded from it.

Author Max Wallace says "it's uncertain from the entry how he believes the subject of Jews effects his faith". Peter Longerich says Catholic student organizations were hesitant to join the radical, anti-Semitic students who had been trying, since the end of World War I, to impose an ethnic criteria for German identity that would exclude Jewish students. There was hostility towards Jews in Catholic organizations too, but it was on religious grounds, not racial ones.

In other entries from 1919 he states plans to move to eastern Europe after the Russian Civil War. He was studying Russian in the evenings.

=== 1920 ===
The entries continue to February 2, 1920, during which time Himmler is in Munich studying agronomy in university program. His diary records leisure activities and his love of food: "Drank coffee and ate marvellous cake" or "Ate sandwiches and goodies." He also arranged parties at the home of Frau Loritz, who provided meals for the students. His diary records a description of one of the parties:

The room decked out as a harem, lanterns, a tent near the oven in the corner for Lu and myself...a colorful, beautiful picture. Frau Loritz served enormously much food, first cocoa, which I spilled over my pants. Lu (Ben Akiba) and I (Abdul Hamid) performed our skit 'Oriental Life' which was very favorably received.

There are no entries between February 1920 and November 1921.

=== 1921–1924 ===
By 1921 Himmler had abandoned his plans to go to Russia and was considering resettling instead in Turkey. His diary for this year is filled mostly with details of his fraternity life and fencing duels. The January 26, 1922 entry is about a meeting that Himmler attends with Ernst Röhm at a tavern in Munich:

Captain Röhm and Major Angerer were also there; very friendly. Röhm pessimistic as to Bolshevism.

The entries stop again between July 6, 1922 to February 11, 1924. It is within this time frame that he receives his diploma in agriculture. There is information on his participation in the Munich Putsch with elder brother Gebhard Himmler in an entry from February 11–25, 1924.

Anti-semitic literature occupies a central role in Himmler's entries beginning in 1923. One entry, critical of a book on German criminal culture Himmler has just finished reading, asserts the author was "someone patronized by Jews and in any event not a Jew hater". In 1924 he reads In the Power of Dark Forces, a conspiracist tract, and while disavowing the author's general "paranoia", Himmler does agree with one assertion: "Description of the Jewish system which is designed to condemn people to a moral death. It's conceivable that there's a persecution complex involved in all this to a certain degree. But the system undoubtedly exists and the Jews operate it."

His diary entry from February 15, 1924 states that he visited Ernst Röhm at Stadelheim prison after the failed Beer Hall Putsch:

Rode out to Stadelheim...talked for twenty minutes with Captain Röhm. We had an excellent conversation and spoke unreservedly. He called Delegate Schaefer the greatest hypocrite and Jesuit of the entire People's party. We also discussed Neunzert whom he trusts completely. If he only does not deceive himself! I had brought him a Grossdeutsche Zeitung and oranges, which pleased him very much.

Hitler's name appears in an entry from February 19, 1924.

== See also ==
- Himmler's wartime diaries
