= Norbert Masur =

Swedish delegate to World Jewish Congress

- Born: 13 May 1901; Friedrichstadt, Germany
- Died: 10 July 1971 (aged 70)
- Occupation: Representative of the World Jewish Congress
- Organizations: World Jewish Congress
- Known for: Secret 1945 meeting with Heinrich Himmler; rescue of the Holocaust victims
- Parents: Leiser Masur (father); Hanna Masur (née Levy) (mother)

Norbert Masur (Mazur) (13 May 1901 – 10 July 1971) was a representative of Sweden to the World Jewish Congress (WJC), which was founded in Geneva in 1936 to unite the Jewish people and to mobilize the world against the Nazis. He aided in the rescue of 7,000 victims of Nazi concentration camps during World War II.

== Biography ==
Masur was born in Friedrichstadt, Germany, one of ten children of Leiser Masur and Hanna Masur (née Levy). He was a German Jew who emigrated to Stockholm and then to Tel Aviv after the war.

In the closing days of the war, when Berlin was cut off from the rest of Germany, almost entirely surrounded by Allied forces, and when the Red Army was just entering the outskirts of the city from the south and east, Masur was flown from Sweden to an extraordinary secret meeting with Reichsführer-SS Heinrich Himmler, ostensibly to discuss the preservation of the Jews who were still alive in the Nazi concentration camps.

With the help of Himmler's osteopath, Felix Kersten, on 19 April 1945 the Swedish section of the WJC arranged for Masur to fly from Stockholm to Tempelhof Airport in central Berlin. Masur was driven out of Berlin to Kersten's estate at Hartzwalde, about 70 kilometres north of Berlin to meet SS-Brigadeführer Walter Schellenberg and Himmler. It was not until the following day, April 20, that Schellenberg arrived at Hartzwalde, and Masur spent most of the day in conversation with him. "For me as a Jew, it was a deeply moving thought that in a few hours, I would be face to face with the man who was primarily responsible for the destruction of several million people," Masur later said.

Himmler himself finally arrived in Hartzwalde at 2.30am on the following day, April 21. From Masur's own account, Himmler spoke for most of the time during the meeting, which lasted two and a half hours, with Himmler presenting the standard Nazi version of Germany's "Jewish Problem". In his own account of the meeting, Masur said "The shallowness of his arguments was unbelievable. He used nothing but lies in his defense..... He only believed that the end justified the means. The fact he was one of those mostly responsible for the mass murder of Jews, was evident from his own words..." Himmler told Masur, "I want to bury the hatchet between us and the Jews. If I had had my own way, many things would have been done differently..."

Antony Beevor says that Himmler's purpose at this meeting was to establish a line of communications with the Western Allies, primarily via the head of the Swedish Red Cross, Folke Bernadotte, who was in Berlin at the same time. Beevor adds the comment that Himmler hoped that he, Himmler, "would become the leader with whom the Western Allies could negotiate. What he had to do was to convince the Jews that the Final Solution was something that both sides needed to put behind them."

As a result of this meeting and subsequent negotiations between Himmler and Count Bernadotte, the WJC was given custody of about 7,000 women from the women's Ravensbrück concentration camp. Approximately half (45%) of these women (who had been deported from over 40 nations) were Jewish. After their liberation they were housed in camps in southern Sweden. Masur expressed his shock at the poor health of the women after several years of imprisonment in various camps. His view was that return to their home countries was impossible for these women and that emigration to Israel was the only option open to these women in order for them to regain their dignity.
