= Himmler's wartime diaries =

Diaries of Himmler (1937–1938/1941–1942/1943–1944)

Himmler's wartime diaries were found in Russia at a defense ministry archive in Podolsk in 2013. They were written by assistants of Heinrich Himmler and contain Himmler's daily schedule in 1937–1938, the year of the Kristallnacht, and also the critical year between 1943 and 1944. The diaries were confiscated by the Red Army after the war with other documents seized from German military installations around Berlin. There is also another diary from 1941–1942 that was found in 1990.

== Content ==
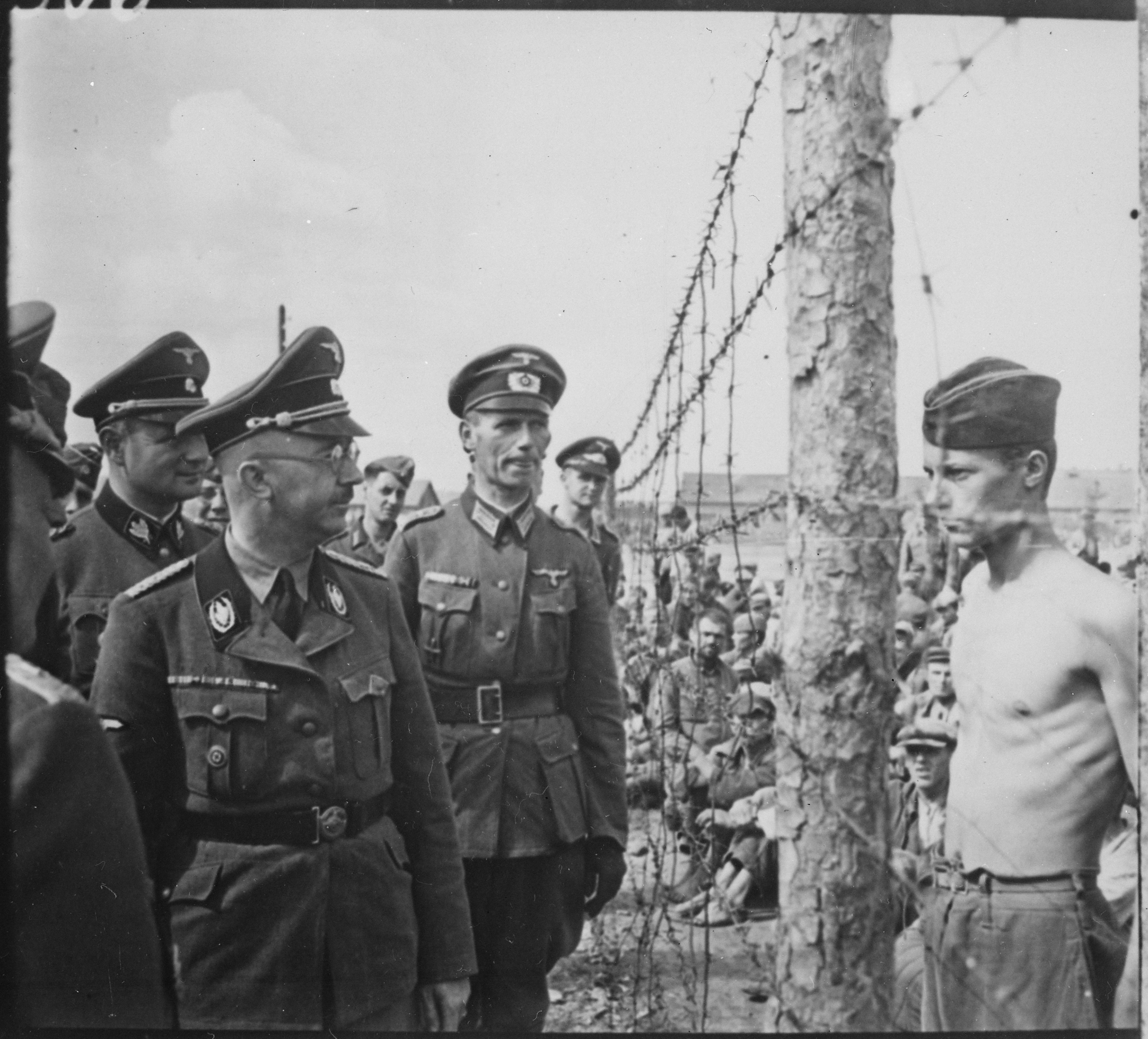
Heinrich Himmler inspecting prisoners of war in the vicinity of Minsk during the Second World War

They show the contrast of Himmler's mundane daily life of having lunch and placing calls to family with the historical events he was involved in, in one instance issuing an order to place new dogs at Auschwitz capable of ripping prisoners to "shreds", in another taking a tour of the Sonderkommando at Majdanek after lunch. One entry reads: "9–10 pm: Orders all ten officers to be executed and their families sent to concentration camps before going to bed" after some police officers in Poland refused to cooperate with the Nazis.

One entry provides details of a trip to Lublin on February 12, 1943. He eats at the airport hotel, then goes to the city of Chełm in eastern Poland for a tour of the SS Sonderkommando. During the tour, the efficiency of the camp's gas vans is demonstrated for Himmler. There was no Jewish transport scheduled for the day of Himmler's visit so four hundred young Jewish women and girls were brought to the camp from the Lublin Ghetto for the demonstration, and afterwards he attended a dinner. Ada Lichtman, one of the few to survive that particular camp, recalls that day: "There was a huge banquet given in his honour. I had to decorate the tables."

On the entry for October 4 the first of the Posen speeches is recorded simply as "17:30: speech to SS officers". This speech, where Himmler describes the mission of the SS as "the extermination of the Jewish race", is considered the clearest public statement Himmler made about the Holocaust.

On the day of Operation Valkyrie, the entry records that he is set to meet with Hitler at the Wolf's Lair at 13:45, then lunch with Wilhelm Keitel. Himmler returns to Berlin that evening, following the execution of Claus von Stauffenberg and his three co-conspirators, who had been arrested earlier that day. In the early hours of the following morning, at 4:08 AM, he bans the use of the word "Valkyrie" in German lands.

The entries record his daily meals. One lunch at Dachau on March 9, 1943 is described as "comradely". During a visit to Buchenwald, the diary records that Himmler "Took a snack in the cafe at the SS kasino" (kasino is a common term in German meaning officer's mess).

According to the entries Himmler's hobbies included stargazing, saunas and card games.

== Significance ==
Historians have described the diaries as "of shudderingly outstanding historical significance". The diaries have been compared with the diaries of Joseph Goebbels in significance, who is the only other major Nazi Party leader with a similarly detailed diary.

== See also ==
- Sobibor extermination camp
- Heinrich Himmler papers, a collection that includes Himmler's early diaries
