= Felix Kersten =

Finnish physiotherapist to Nazis (1898–1960)

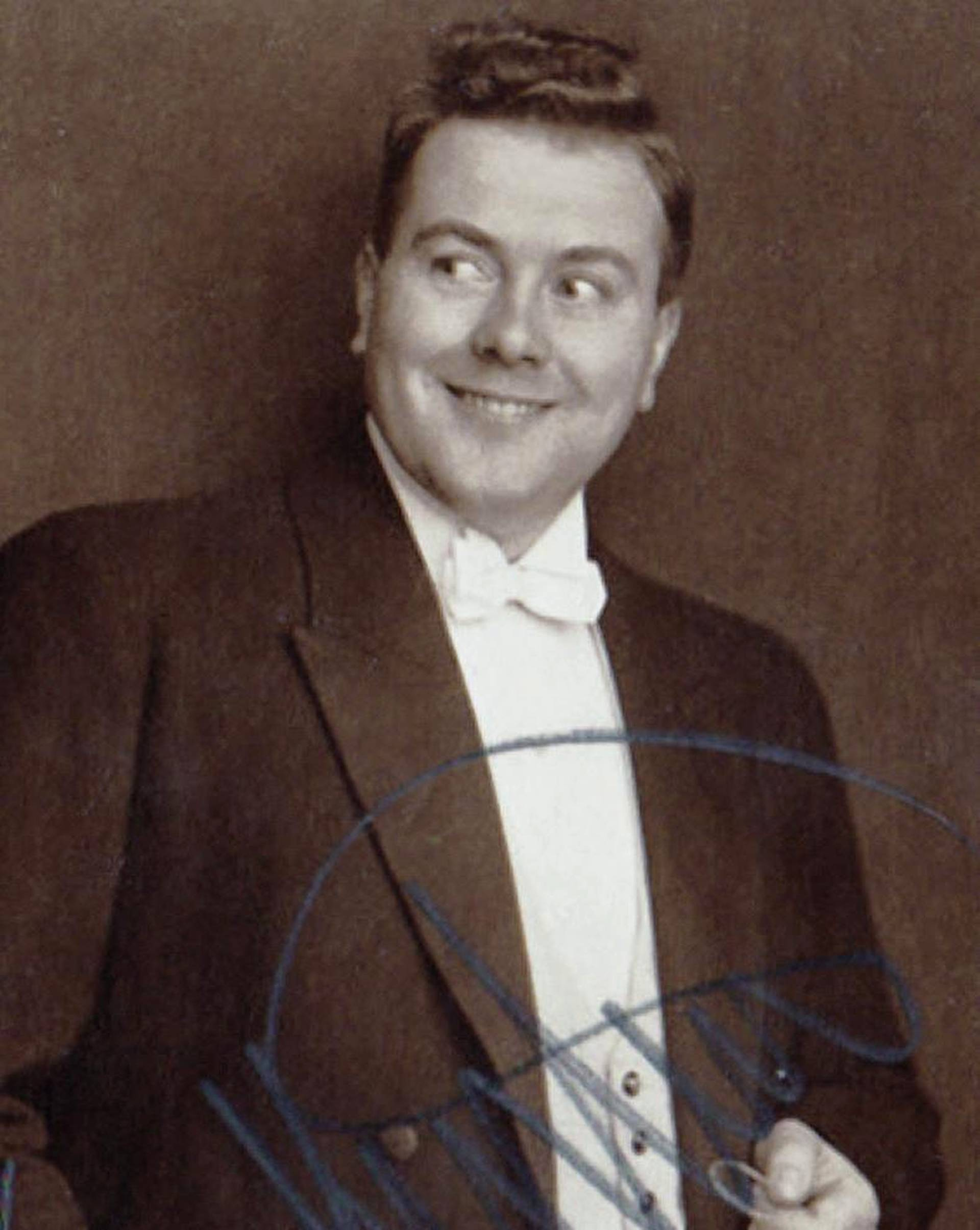
Felix Kersten c. 1920

Eduard Alexander Felix Kersten (30 September 1898 – 16 April 1960) was the personal physical therapist of Reichsführer-SS Heinrich Himmler.

== Early life ==
Kersten was born in a Baltic German family in Dorpat, Imperial Russia, now Tartu, in Estonia. During the First World War he fought in the German Army and arrived in Finland in April 1918 with the German forces that intervened in the Finnish Civil War. Kersten served for a while in the Suojeluskunta, was granted Finnish citizenship in 1920, and in September 1921 was commissioned as a 2nd Lieutenant (vänrikki) in the Finnish Army.

After his return to civilian life, Kersten remained in Helsinki, where he studied therapy with the specialist Dr Colander, and after two years was awarded a certificate in physical therapy. He then left for Berlin, where he continued his studies and eventually became the pupil of a notable Chinese therapeutic masseur, Dr Ko, whom he had met at a dinner party. In 1925, Ko told Kersten "You have learned all I can teach you." He then turned his practice over to Kersten and retired to Tibet.

Kersten had a number of influential patients, among them Prince Hendrik of the Netherlands (after 1928) and Benito Mussolini's son-in-law, the Italian Foreign Minister Count Ciano. Kersten accepted Heinrich Himmler's request to become his personal physical therapist, writing later that he feared for his safety if he had refused.

He was able to alleviate Himmler's severe stomach pains with his skills and gained his trust. Kersten used this trust to obtain pardons and the release of underground prisoners, labor camp inmates, homosexuals and others.

== Second World War ==
During the Second World War, Kersten was involved in organizing Himmler's visit to Finland in August 1942. During the visit, Himmler would have demanded that all Finnish Jews be extradited to the Gestapo, according to Kersten. Risto Ryti, the President of Finland, summed up in his diary that Himmler was “an extremely steep anti-semite”. Kersten, for his part, told Ryti about the situation of Jews in Germany: “Jews are sent a lot out of Germany to Latvia and Poland, where they are massacred in cold blood,” and talked about “human slaughter”. This was possibly the first time President Ryti had heard of the massacre of Jews. Kersten also provided information to Abrams S. Hewitt of the Stockholm desk of the OSS, predecessor of the CIA.

Towards the end of the war, Kersten arranged a meeting between Himmler and Norbert Masur, a member of the Swedish branch of the World Jewish Congress, in Hartzwalde, a few miles from Ravensbrück concentration camp. As a result, Himmler agreed to spare the lives of the remaining 60,000 Jews left in Nazi concentration camps days before their liberation by the Allies.

In December 1945, the World Jewish Congress presented Kersten with a letter thanking him for helping to save Jewish concentration camp victims.

== Later life ==
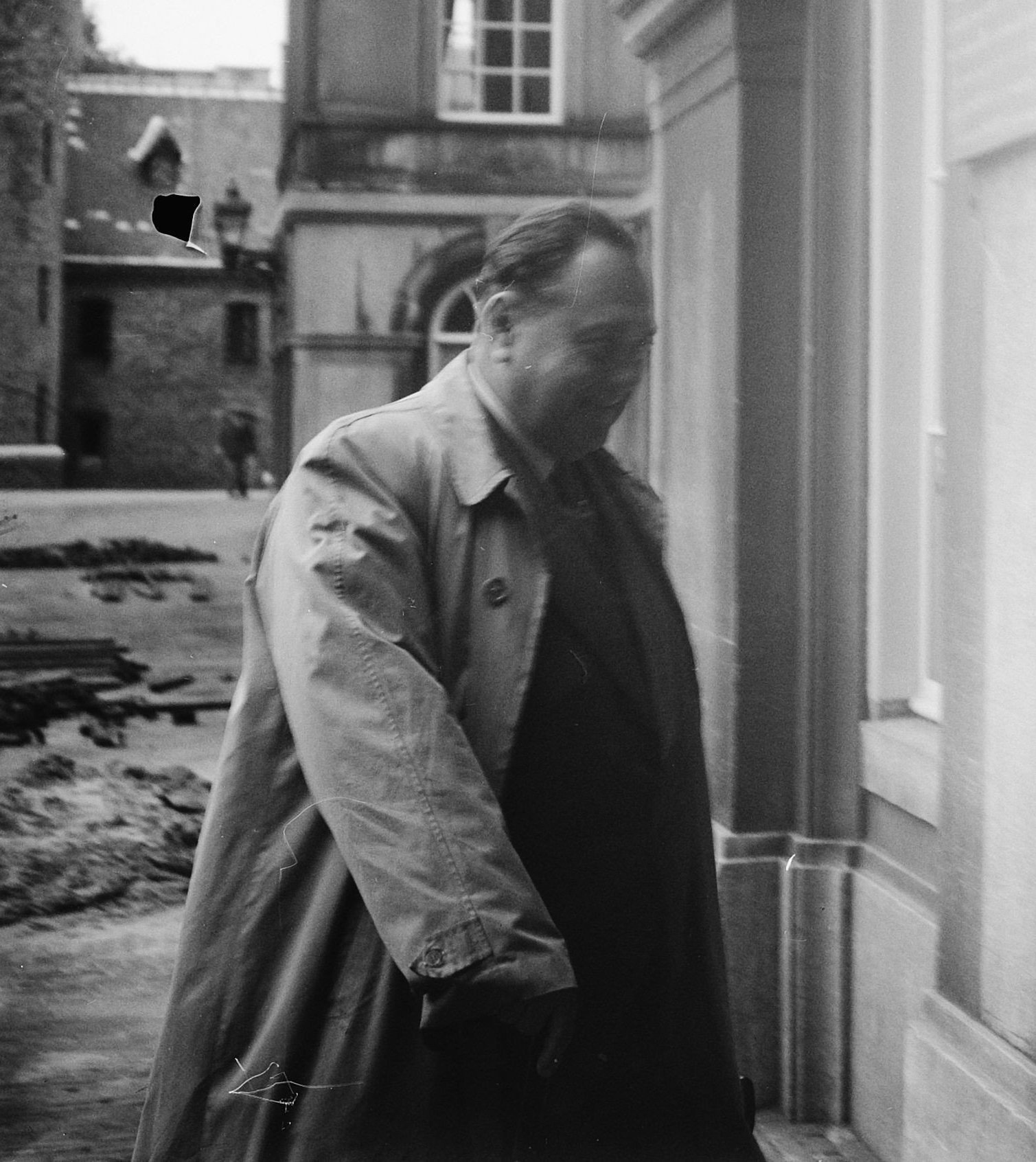
Kersten (1948)

In his postwar memoirs, Kersten took credit for saving the entirety of the Dutch population from being forcibly deported to Nazi-occupied Eastern Europe. In January 1950, the Dutch monarchy awarded him the Order of Orange-Nassau on the basis of his account. However, a later investigation by Dutch historian Louis de Jong concluded that the mass deportation plan had not existed, as well as that many of Kersten's documents had been fabricated.

The Swedish archives testify that Kersten was an intermediary between Himmler and Count Folke Bernadotte in the negotiations that led to the rescue operation 'The White Buses', saving hundreds of Norwegians and Danes from certain death in the last days of the Third Reich.

Kersten's claims of being instrumental in saving Finland's Jews from German hands may be exaggerated, but the Finnish government used his services in the hope of influencing Himmler.

After the war, Kersten lived in West Germany and Sweden, taking Swedish citizenship in 1953. He died in Hamm, while he was visiting Germany, aged 61.

Kersten's war memoirs were published in English translation in 1947 and a second edition was published in 1956 (The Kersten memoirs, 1940–1945, London 1956) with an introduction by Hugh Trevor-Roper.

== In popular culture ==
Writer and journalist Joseph Kessel was the first to write about the life of Felix Kersten, in his book The man with the Miraculous Hands (1960). Woody Harrelson is set to portray Felix Kersten in the Oren Moverman feature film adaptation of Joseph Kessel's novel.

Finnish Filmmaker Arto Koskinen, when in the process of making a film about Felix Kersten, came to find archival evidence about Kersten showing his memoirs to be highly unreliable among other things, and posted a podcast series about his findings.

Felix Kersten is parodied in the Woody Allen book Getting Even, in the chapter entitled "The Schmeed Memoirs", in which a fictional barber in wartime Germany describes his time as a hair stylist for Adolf Hitler and other high-ranking Nazi officers.

Kersten also appears as a character in the film Hitler: a Film from Germany, directed by Hans-Jürgen Syberberg and as the main character in the 2014 novel Gods and Devils.

Kersten is played by actor Martin Jarvis in the radio play by Neville Watchurst A Vital Flaw, about his work to help Heinrich Himmler's health. The play was first broadcast on BBC Radio 4 in February 1994, then on BBC Radio 4 Extra on 5 September 2009.

Claes Bang plays Kersten in the 2026 film Ich ist ein Anderer (I is Another).
