= Ernst Hermann Himmler =

Nazi functionary and younger brother of Heinrich Himmler

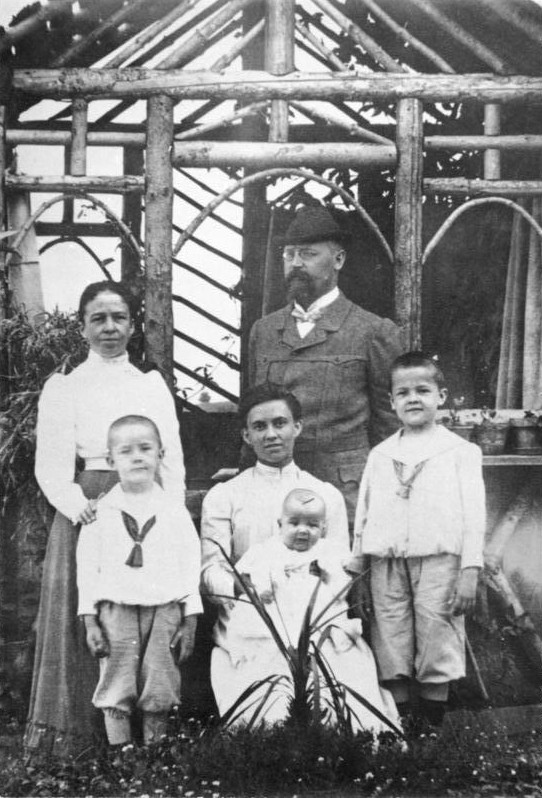
Gebhard and Anna Himmler (standing) with their three children: Heinrich (left), Ernst (centre) and Gebhard (right) in a 1906 photograph

Ernst Hermann Himmler (23 December 1905 – 2 May 1945) was a German Nazi functionary, electrical engineer and younger brother of Reichsführer-SS Heinrich Himmler.

== Life ==
Ernst Hermann Himmler was born on 23 December 1905 in Munich, The third and youngest son of a headmaster (Oberstudiendirektor) Joseph Gebhard Himmler (born 17 May 1865 in Lindau; died 29 October 1936 in Munich), and Anna Maria Heyder (born 16 January 1866 in Bregenz; died 10 September 1941 in Munich). His siblings were Heinrich Himmler (born 7 October 1900 in Munich; died 23 May 1945 in Lüneburg) and Gebhard Ludwig Himmler (born 29 July 1898 in Munich; died 1982 in Munich).

Ernst Himmler completed his university course in electrical engineering in 1928. He joined the Nazi Party on 1 November 1931 (member no. 676,777). In 1933, he joined the SS, and, with Heinrich's help, he got a job with the Berlin radio. He quickly became director within the Reich broadcasting organization. On several occasions, Ernst supplied Heinrich with internal information from the broadcasting world. He ultimately reached the rank of SS-Sturmbannführer in 1939. Ernst Himmler was killed in action serving with the Volkssturm during fierce fighting in the Battle of Berlin.

Ernst Himmler was the grandfather of author Katrin Himmler.

== Bibliography ==
- Himmler, Katrin (2007). The Himmler Brothers. London: Pan Macmillan. ISBN 978-0-330-44814-7.
- Longerich, Peter (2012). Heinrich Himmler: A Life. Oxford; New York: Oxford University Press. ISBN 978-0-19-959232-6.
