= Katrin Himmler =

German author

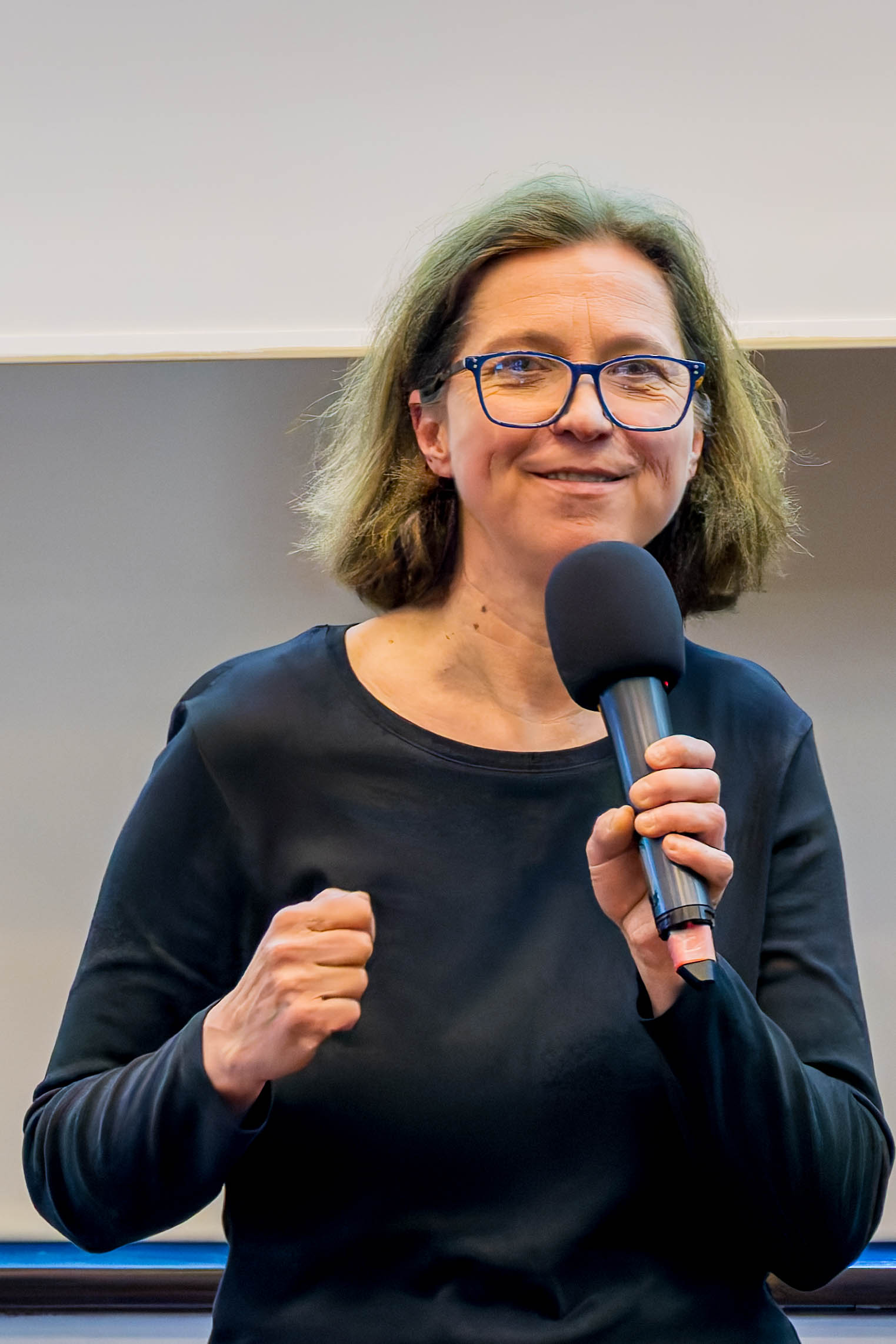
- Born: 1967 (age 58–59); Germany
- Occupation: Writer

Katrin Himmler (born 1967) is a German author. She is the granddaughter of Ernst Himmler (1905–1945), and great-niece of his older brother Heinrich Himmler, one of the leading figures of Nazi Germany. She is the author of Die Brüder Himmler: Eine deutsche Familiengeschichte, published in English as The Himmler Brothers: A German Family History.

== Biography ==
Katrin Himmler grew up in Spain and southern Germany, studied political science, and explored the topics of racism and interculturality. She lives with her son in Berlin.

Katrin Himmler is a protagonist of the 2011 documentary film "My Family, the Nazis, and I" ("Hitler's Children") by Israeli director Chanoch Ze'evi about the descendants of Nazi perpetrators. In 2014, she published the book "Himmler Privat – Briefe eines Massenmörders" (Himmler Privat – Letters of a Mass Murderer) with historian Michael Wildt, published by Piper Verlag. It included newly discovered letters from Heinrich Himmler to his wife Margarete (1893–1967) from 1927–1933 and 1940–1945, supplemented by letters and diaries from Margarete and their daughter Gudrun (1929–2018). Himmler and Wildt also collaborated on the documentary "Der Anständige" ("The Decent One") by director Vanessa Lapa, which was presented at the 2014 Berlinale and is based, among other things, on these letters.

=== Books ===
Katrin Himmler's book Die Brüder Himmler: Eine deutsche Familiengeschichte was published in 2005 in Germany by S. Fischer Verlag and in 2007 in English by Macmillan as The Himmler Brothers: A German Family History.

Her book traces the lives of the three Himmler brothers (the eldest was Gebhard Himmler), the sons of a respected secondary school headmaster in Munich. Gebhard served in the German Army in World War I, but Heinrich, who at 18 was still an officer cadet when the war ended, was too young to see frontline service. Katrin Himmler speculates that it was frustration at this and envy of his brother that led Heinrich to join the extreme right-wing Freikorps in 1919. In the Freikorps he served under Ernst Röhm and was thus led into the Nazi Party.

Despite her family being told her grandfather Ernst had had no interest in politics, Katrin discovered that he was an enthusiastic Nazi who had joined the party in 1931, and was also an officer in the Schutzstaffel (SS). Ernst was killed in the fighting in Berlin in May 1945.

"Many times during my research it was quite difficult for me to go on," Himmler told an interviewer in August 2007. "As things were revealed it became more and more shocking. We descendents were left in no doubt about what Heinrich had done. But his actions cast a large shadow that the rest of the family were standing in, many of them hiding in there."

Her most disturbing discovery was that her grandfather had directly caused the deportation and death of a Jewish engineer, a Major Schmidt, deputy manager of an engineering firm, who had been protected because of his expertise. Writing to Heinrich, Ernst dismissed his usefulness, knowing that he would then be reclassified and deported to a labour camp.

Justin Cartwright, reviewing the book for The Daily Telegraph, commented: "As Katrin Himmler writes, it would have been perfectly possible for him [Ernst] to have supported Schmidt without any danger to himself as the brother of the Reichsführer. For her this was a turning point: she realised once and for all just how deeply her grandfather and her great-uncle Gebhard were in thrall to their brother's murderous racial policies."

Doug Johnstone wrote in The List: "Katrin's book is admirably level-headed, a meticulous memoir of an extraordinary family, and the author never resorts to histrionics, preferring to let the facts speak for themselves. Originally written as self-therapy, the book stands as a testament to the enduring legacy of guilt the Nazis left behind for future generations."

Robert Hawks, however, wrote in The Independent: "Katrin does try to turn some equivocal evidence into revelations of her family's complicity, but her prosecutorial stance gets in the way of empathy. In the end, The Himmler Brothers raises more questions about its subject than it is capable of answering, but that doesn't lessen in the slightest my admiration of Katrin Himmler for having written it."

Himmler is one of the protagonists of the television documentary Hitler's Children (in German: "Meine Familie, die Nazis und Ich") of the Israeli director Chanoch Zeevi about descendants of the Nazi elite, amongst them Rainer Höss.

== Personal life ==
Himmler was born in Dinslaken. She is married to an Israeli. Despite the opportunity to take her spouse's surname, she chose to keep the name Himmler, rather than deny her heritage.

Katrin Himmler said that she researched and wrote the book so that her son would have a full understanding of his family's history. She told an interviewer: "When my husband and I had our son, it became clear I had to break with the family tradition of not speaking about the past. I wanted to give my son as much information as possible, so that when he starts asking questions about my family, at least I can answer him."
