= Gebhard Ludwig Himmler =

German Nazi Party functionary

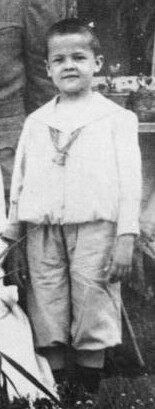
- Gebhard in 1906
- Born: 29 July 1898; Munich, Germany
- Died: 22 June 1982 (aged 83); Munich, West Germany
- Spouse: Mathilde Hilde Wendler (m. 1926)
- Children: 3
- Military career
- Allegiance: German Empire; Nazi Germany
- Branch: Bavarian Army; Schutzstaffel
- Service years: 1917-1918; 1939-1945
- Rank: Fähnrich (Bavarian Army); SS-Standartenführer
- Service number: NSDAP: 1,117,822; SS: 214,049
- Units: 16th Bavarian Infantry Regiment (World War I); 19th Bavarian Infantry Regiment, 7th Infantry Division (World War II)
- Known for: Older brother of Heinrich Himmler
- Conflicts: World War I; Western Front; Hundred Days Offensive; Second Battle of the Marne; World War II; Invasion of Poland; Western Allied invasion of Germany (POW)
- Other work: Teacher and mechanical engineer

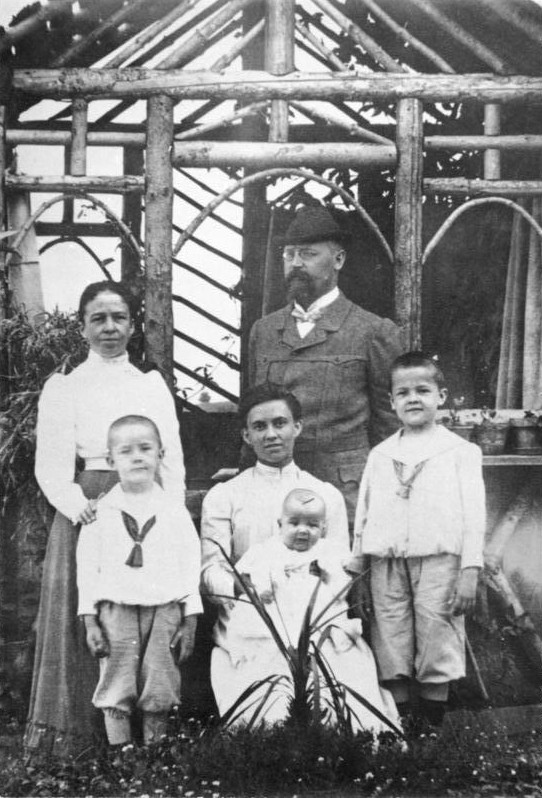
Gebhard and Anna Himmler (standing) with their three children: Heinrich (left), Ernst with maid (centre) and Gebhard (right) in a 1906 photograph

Gebhard Ludwig Himmler (29 July 1898 – 22 June 1982) was a German Nazi functionary, politician, mechanical engineer and older brother of Reichsführer-SS Heinrich Himmler.

== Upbringing ==
Gebhard Ludwig Himmler was born on 29 July 1898 in Munich, the first son of a schoolmaster who later became a headmaster (Oberstudiendirektor), Joseph Gebhard Himmler (born 17 May 1865 in Lindau; died 29 October 1936 in Munich), and Anna Maria Heyder (born 16 January 1866 in Bregenz; died 10 September 1941 in Munich). His siblings were Heinrich Himmler (born 7 October 1900 in Munich; who killed himself in British custody, 23 May 1945 in Lüneburg) and Ernst Hermann Himmler (born 23 December 1905 in Munich; died 2 May 1945).

On 3 November 1902, the family moved to Passau, where Joseph Gebhard Himmler taught Greek and Latin at the Königlich humanistisches Gymnasium.

From 1904 to 1906, he attended the cathedral school on the Frauenplatz in Munich. From 1906 to 1908, he went to the Amalienschule, and from 1909 to 1916, to the Wilhelmsgymnasium. In 1916, because he was still working on his Abitur, he was exempted from conscription in the Bavarian Army. In March 1917, he took his Abitur early and passed.

He was a member of the Studentenverbindung, AGV München, where he got to know Richard Wendler, later to become his brother-in-law. On 18 September 1926, he married Mathilde Hilde Wendler, whom he had met at a ball held by the Apollo students' association. The couple had three daughters: Irmgard (born 21 October 1927), Anneliese (born 16 October 1930) and Heide (born 13 March 1940 in Gmund am Tegernsee).

== Wartime service and early career ==
In 1917, Himmler passed an officer training course and, in May 1917, joined 16th Bavarian Infantry Regiment in Passau. In summer that year he participated in an exercise at Grafenwöhr, passed a Fahnenjunker course and, subsequently, a machine gunner's course in Lagerlechfeld. On 9 April 1918, Himmler arrived in Lorraine on the Western Front and then took part in the Battle of Château-Thierry, 65 km east from Paris, as a runner between battalion and regimental headquarters.

In 1919, after the end of the war, Himmler and his brother, Heinrich, left the Munich citizens' militia, the Einwohnerwehr, to join the 21st Rifle Brigade (Schützenbrigade 21) of the paramilitary Freikorps under Franz Ritter von Epp. In early 1923, Himmler joined the Bund Reichskriegsflagge under Ernst Röhm, who took part in the Beer Hall Putsch in November 1923.

From 15 January 1919 to July 1923, he took a course in mechanical engineering at the Technical University of Munich. From July 1923 to the introduction of the Rentenmark currency, Himmler worked for the Bavarian Hypo-Bank. In 1924 he worked in the construction office of the engineering firm, Fritz Neumeyer AG, in the Munich quarter of Freimann. From January 1925 he was an assistant teacher at the municipal vocational and technical school for precision engineering on Munich's Deroystraße; from April 1925 he was appointed as a teacher (Studienrat) there and taught technical drawing, physics and instrumentation.

== Nazi functionary ==
On 30 January 1933, Himmler was appointed headmaster of the vocational school on Deroystraße in Munich and on 1 November 1935 he became headmaster of the Oskar von Miller Polytechnic, a higher education establishment specializing in technology.

In May 1933 Himmler joined the Nazi Party (member no. 1.117.822) and the Verein für das Deutschtum im Ausland. In order to avoid the appearance of being an opportunist, at his request the lower Nazi membership number of his wife was transferred to him. Before 30 January 1933, Himmler became the head of the Bavarian vocational schools association. This was transferred in 1933 into the National Socialist Teachers League (NSLB). Himmler became deputy and, subsequently, head of the Gau Students Association (Gaufachschaftsleiter) for the Gau of Upper Bavaria.

From his appointment as director of the vocational school in Deroystraße, Himmler devoted himself to numerous honorary offices in the Nazi regime and was largely exempted from teaching. He trained as an officer and continued to work with the NSLB. From early 1936, he worked in the head office for technology in the Nazi Party, the Hauptamt für Technik in der NSDAP, and in the Nazi Federation for German Technology (NS-Bund Deutscher Technik), led by Fritz Todt and to which, until 1938, almost all technical-scientific associations, such as the Association of German Engineers (VDI), were connected.

The VDI defined the guidelines for the award of the title "engineer". Himmler helped to shape this corporate representative body and exercised the state's political power in a discriminatory and party-political manner.

On 1 August 1939, Himmler was called up and assigned to the 19th Bavarian Infantry. He was deployed with his company to Czechoslovakia on the Polish border.

After the start of the Second World War on 1 September, he participated in the Invasion of Poland. The 19th Infantry was part of the 14th Army. At the end of the fighting, on 16 and 17 September, the regiment was located west of Lemberg (now Lviv), but was transferred to the Lower Rhine in October 1939.

Himmler enjoyed the protection of Fritz Todt, who ensured that, in December 1939, he was posted to Department E IV of the Reichserziehungsministerium in Berlin. On 12 July 1940, he was promoted from principal (Oberstudiendirektor) to director (Ministerialrat). From June 1940, Gebhard and Hilde Himmler lived with their family in Hähnelstraße in the Berlin district of Friedenau. From August 1943, Himmler lived with his brother, Ernst, in Ruhleben in Berlin. In 1944, Wilhelm Heering (1877–1962), director (Ministerialdirigent) at the Reichserziehungsministerium, retired, and Himmler became his successor.

Until 1946, his family lived at Haus Lindenfycht in Gmund am Tegernsee with Margarete Himmler; during renovation work at the private villa she looked after prisoners at the subcamp of KZ Dachau. On 30 January 1944, Himmler became an SS-Standartenführer (SS-Nr. 214.049) and, on 30 March 1944, was promoted to SS-Standartenführer der Reserve in the Waffen-SS and was employed as inspector of Waffen-SS schools.

== Post-war ==
Himmler was taken prisoner by the British Army near Kappeln on the Schlei. In early March 1946, he was interned at the Emil Köster Leather Factory in Gadeland; later, he was transferred to Bad Fallingbostel on the Lüneburg Heath. In 1948 he was moved to an internment camp in Ungererstraße in Munich.

Himmler's grave in Munich

Following his release in 1948, he worked on the manufacture of capacitors in Hoffmannstraße in Munich. Karl Hudezeck (1934–1945, headmaster of the Wittelsbacher-Gymnasium München) gave him a denazification certificate for the Nazi era. At a denazification panel he was assessed as Category II – Follower (belastet).

In the European-Afghan Cultural Office in Munich, Himmler, as director (Ministerialdirigent a. D.) and engineer, worked as a study adviser and arranged internships for Afghan students. He was barred from working for the government and he was disqualified from his pension, but he successfully appealed this in 1959. He died in Munich on 22 June 1982, aged 83.

== Publications ==
- Technik und Ingenieurerziehung, in: Deutsche Technik, 6, 1938, pp. 313–315.
- Die Ingenieurschule und die Anforderungen an den Nachwuchs, in: Deutsche Technik, 10, 1942: 496ff.
- Junge Afghanen zur Ausbildung in Deutschland, in: Institut für Auslandsbeziehungen. Mitteilungen 9–10/1954, pp. 243f.

== Bibliography ==
- Himmler, Katrin (2007). The Himmler Brothers. London: Pan Macmillan. ISBN 978-0-330-44814-7.
- Longerich, Peter (2012). Heinrich Himmler: A Life. Oxford; New York: Oxford University Press. ISBN 978-0-19-959232-6.
