= Hans Schwedler =

SS and Police Leader and SS-Brigadeführer

- Born: 17 October 1878; Berlin, Kingdom of Prussia, German Empire
- Died: 2 May 1945 (age 66); Hechendorf, Nazi Germany
- Military career
- Allegiance: German Empire; Nazi Germany
- Branch: Imperial German Army; Schutzstaffel; Waffen-SS
- Service years: 1898–1919; 1932–1945
- Rank: Major; SS-Brigadeführer and Generalmajor of the Waffen-SS
- Commands: SS and Police Leader, "Krakau"
- Conflicts: World War I World War II
- Awards: Iron Cross, 1st and 2nd class War Merit Cross, 1st and 2nd class Wound Badge, in black

Otto Hugo Hans Schwedler (17 October 1878 – 2 May 1945) was a German Nazi SS-Brigadeführer and Generalmajor of the Waffen-SS who served as the SS and Police Leader in the Kraków District during the establishment of the Kraków Ghetto. He also was involved in the administration of the Nazi concentration camp system, and committed suicide close to the end of the Second World War in Europe.

== Early life ==
Schwedler was born in Berlin, the son of a businessman. After completing his education, he sought a professional military career by joining the Imperial German Army and was commissioned a Leutnant in 1898. He served in the First World War as a company and battalion commander. He earned the Iron Cross, 1st and 2nd class, and the Wound Badge, in black. In February 1919 he was discharged from the army with the rank of Major. In 1920 he joined Der Stahlhelm, the German military veterans organization.

== Peacetime SS career ==
Schwedler joined the Nazi Party in February 1931 (membership number 455,899) and the SS (membership number 60,740) in November 1932. On 31 July 1933 he was commissioned an SS-Untersturmführer. Advancing rapidly up the ranks, he served from July 1933 to 10 June 1934 as the Chief of Staff in SS-Abschnitt (District) I, based in Munich. He next commanded the 79th SS-Standarte, with headquarters in Ulm until 4 December 1934. From December 1934, he served at the SS-Junker School in Bad Tölz as an instructor and, from January to November 1938, as Deputy Commandant. He then transferred to the SS leadership school in Braunschweig until January 1940 when he was promoted to SS-Oberführer and returned to Bad Tölz. He remained there until July 1940 and, at the same time, was also assigned to the inspectorate of the SS-Totenkopfverbände (Death's Head Units) which administered the system of Nazi concentration camps. From July to October 1940, he served as Inspector of the SS-Totenkopfstandarten (Death's Head Regiments).

== Second World War ==
Schwedler was named the second SS and Police Leader (SSPF) of the Kraków District (German:Krakau Distrikt) in the General Government on 1 October 1940, succeeding SS-Gruppenführer Karl Zech. In this post, he commanded all SS personnel and police in his jurisdiction, including the Ordnungspolizei (Orpo; regular uniformed police), the SD (intelligence service) and the SiPo (security police), which included the Gestapo (secret police). He held this posting until 4 August 1941. His tenure as SSPF was marked by the establishment of the Kraków Ghetto in March 1941. The ghetto, which would hold some 15,000 to 20,000 Jews, was enclosed by a wall made of barbed wire and stone, constructed using Jewish forced labor.

On 4 August 1941, Schwedler was made an Oberführer of the Waffen-SS and transferred to become the SS garrison commander of Prague, the seat of the Protectorate of Bohemia-Moravia, where he remained until March 1942. From that time until August 1943, he headed the supply command of the Waffen-SS and police under SS-Obergruppenführer Hans-Adolf Prützmann, the Higher SS and Police Leader (HSSPF) of Russland-Süd (southern Russia). On 9 November 1942, Schwedler was promoted to SS-Brigadeführer and Generalmajor of the Waffen-SS. From August 1943 he worked at SS headquarters in Berlin in the SS-Führungshauptamt (SS Leadership Main Office) the administrative and operational headquarters for the Waffen-SS. There he first headed Amt XI (Officer Training) and, from autumn 1944, Inspectorate 7 (Signals). Just days before the end of the war in Europe, Schwedler committed suicide on 2 May 1945.

SS Ranks
Date	Rank
31 July 1933	SS-Untersturmführer
9 November 1933	SS-Obersturmführer
20 April 1934	SS-Sturmhauptführer
20 April 1935	SS-Sturmbannführer
1 January 1936	SS-Obersturmbannführer
9 November 1938	SS-Standartenführer
30 January 1940	SS-Oberführer
4 August 1941	Oberführer der Waffen-SS
9 November 1942	SS-Brigadeführer und Generalmajor der Waffen-SS

== Sources ==
- Schiffer Publishing Ltd., ed. (2000). SS Officers List: SS-Standartenführer to SS-Oberstgruppenführer (As of 30 January 1942). Schiffer Military History Publishing. ISBN 0-7643-1061-5.
- Yerger, Mark C. (1997). Allgemeine-SS: The Commands, Units and Leaders of the General SS. Schiffer Publishing Ltd. ISBN 0-7643-0145-4.
