= Carden Loyd tankette =

British tankette

Carden Loyd Tankette
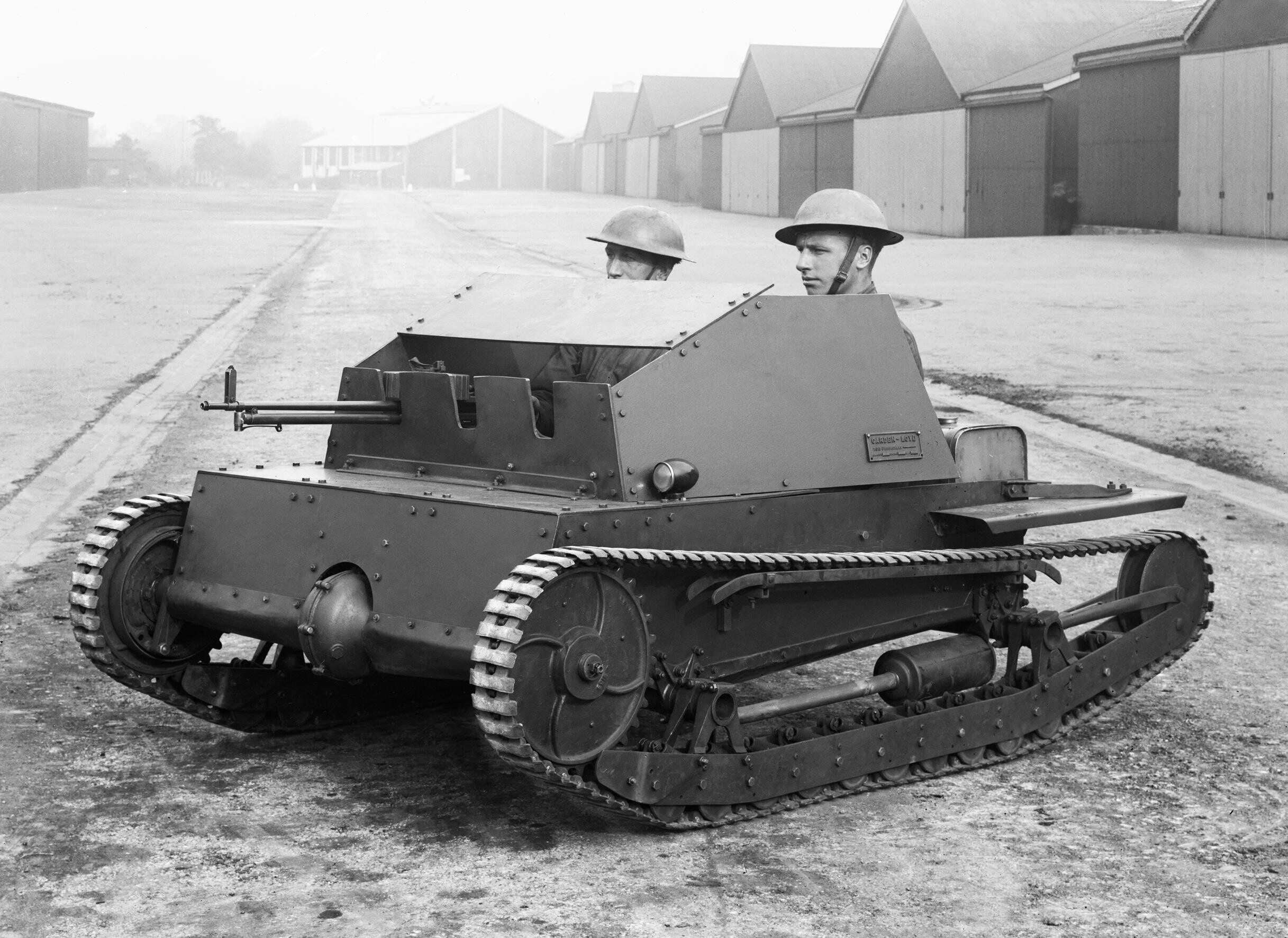
- Type: Tankette
- Place of origin: United Kingdom

Service history
- Used by: See Service history
- Wars: Chaco War; French-Thai War; Winter War; World War II; German invasion of the Netherlands; Greco–Italian War

Production history
- Designer: Carden-Loyd Tractors Ltd.
- Manufacturer: Vickers-Armstrong
- Produced: 1927–1935
- No. built: 450
- Variants: TKS T-27

Specifications (Mark VI)
- Mass: 1.5 long tons (1.5 t) "battle weight"
- Length: 8 ft 1 in (2.46 m)
- Width: 6 ft 6.5 in (1.994 m) over tracks
- Height: 4 ft 0 in (1.22 m)
- Crew: 2
- Armour: 6–9 mm (0.24–0.35 in) face-hardened
- Main armament: 0.303 inch Vickers machine gun with 1,000 rounds
- Engine: Ford Model T petrol 4-cylinder 22.5 bhp (16.8 kW)
- Transmission: Model T two-speed epicyclic
- Suspension: Bogie, four rubber-tyred wheels each side
- Fuel capacity: 10 imperial gallons (45 L; 12 US gal)
- Operational range: 100 mi (160 km)
- Maximum speed: 30 mph (48 km/h) on road

The Carden Loyd tankettes were a series of British tankettes of the period between the World Wars, the most successful of which was the Mark VI, the only version built in significant numbers. It became a classic tankette design worldwide, was licence-built by several countries and became the basis of several designs produced in various countries.

== Development ==
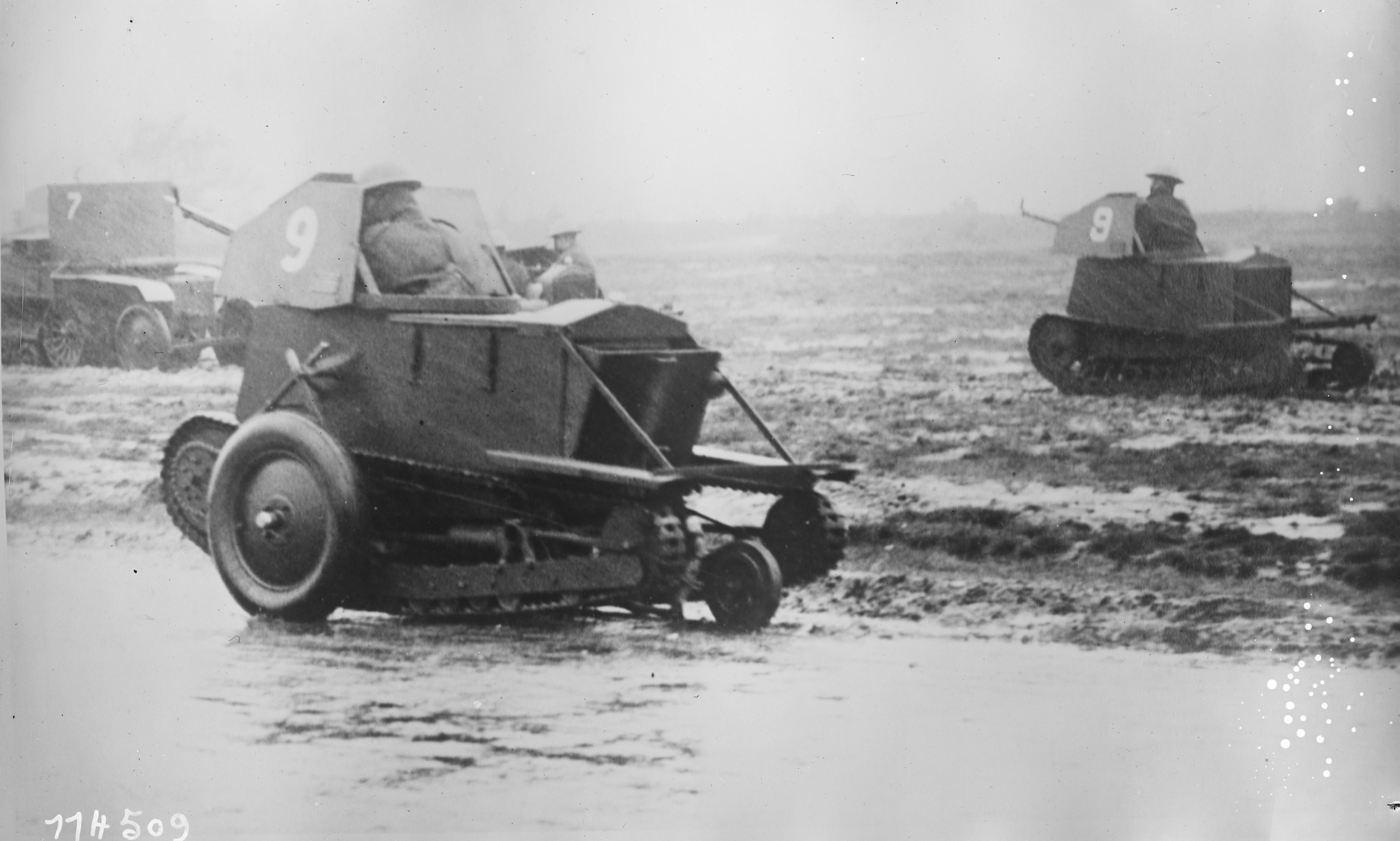
Early Carden Loyd tankette, single-seater, wheel-cum-track-version

The Carden Loyd tankette came about from an idea started, as a private project, by the British military engineer and tank strategist Major Giffard LeQuesne Martel. He built a one-man tank in his garage from various parts and showed it to the War Office in the mid-1920s. With the publication of the idea, other companies produced their own interpretations of the idea. One of these was Carden-Loyd Tractors Ltd, a firm founded by Sir John Carden and Vivian Loyd and later purchased by Vickers-Armstrongs. Besides one-man vehicles they also proposed two-man vehicles which turned out to be a more effective and popular idea. Vickers-Armstrongs manufactured and marketed vehicles of the latter type worldwide.

Considered a reconnaissance vehicle and a mobile machine gun position, the Mark VI was the final stage of development of the Carden Loyd series of tankettes.

The Carden Loyd tankette was the prototype for the Universal Carrier.

== Production ==
Production started in 1927 and lasted until 1935. From 1933 to 1935 production was by the Royal Ordnance Factories. Some 450 were made in all. The British Army used at least 325 Mark VI tankettes (a value of 348 is also given) in several variants, mostly as machine gun carriers, but also as light gun tractors, mortar carriers or smoke projector vehicles.

== Service history ==
In 1929, Poland bought 10 or 11 Mark VI tankettes with a licence and used them for development of their own TK tankette series, which was followed by the Polish TKS tankette.

Czechoslovakia also bought three Mark VI tankettes in 1930 with a licence, and then improved the design, producing 74 Tančík vz. 33 tankettes in the ČKD (Praga) works; the original British construction was evaluated as unusable in modern warfare.

The Soviet Union bought 20 Mark VI tankettes, which they designated K-25, as well as a licence. However, the final project was significantly modernised and the licence was dropped. Instead, the Bolshevik Factory in Leningrad started the production of the T-27 tankette, a modernised and enlarged variant of the British design. A total of 3,228 T-27 tankettes were built between 1931 and 1933.

Bolivia purchased between two and five tankettes in 1931. They saw action in the Chaco War, where they proved to be ill-suited for the bush environment.

The Imperial Japanese Army (IJA) bought six Mark VIb tankettes from the UK, along with some French Renault UE Chenillette vehicles and field tested them. The IJA determined that the British and French vehicles were too small to be practical, and started planning for a larger version, the Tokushu Keninsha (TK, meaning "Special Tractor"), which developed into its own Type 94 Te Ke. The design based in part on the Carden Loyd. Carden Loyd tankettes were operated by the Imperial Japanese Navy Land Forces in Shanghai and designated the Type Ka machine gun car (カ式機銃車, Ka-shiki Kijūsha). "Ka" is an initial of Carden Loyd (カーデン ロイド, Kāden Roido)

Italy bought Carden Loyd Mark VIs, built a few licence copies designated CV-29, and then developed this design further into the L3/35 tankette.

The Canadian Army acquired 12, in two batches of six, in 1930-31. After being evaluated by Princess Patricia's Canadian Light Infantry and the Royal Canadian Regiment, the Canadian Army used them in a training role at Canadian Armoured Fighting Vehicle School, pending the arrival of newer, larger tanks. Eventually, they were supplemented with the Vickers VI B light tank in 1938. Until then, they had been the only armoured equipment in the Canadian Army, apart from some armoured cars. Canada never used them in a combat role.

Carden Loyd Tankettes were also supplied in small numbers to France, India, Italy, Latvia (18 Mk.s IV in 1935), the Netherlands (5), and Siam. The five Dutch tankettes were involved in fighting German paratroopers during the May 1940 invasion of the Netherlands. The French unarmed Renault UE carrier was based on the Carden Loyd design. A small number were acquired by Greece prior to 1935. Thailand had about 60 in the French-Thai War. Carden Loyd Tankettes were also used by Chile, the Republic of China, Manchukuo (20 Mk. VI), Finland (Mk. IVs and Model 33s), Portugal (6) and Ethiopia (3).

The design of the German Panzer I light tank was influenced by the Carden Loyd Tankette, due to the German military cooperation with the Soviet Union.

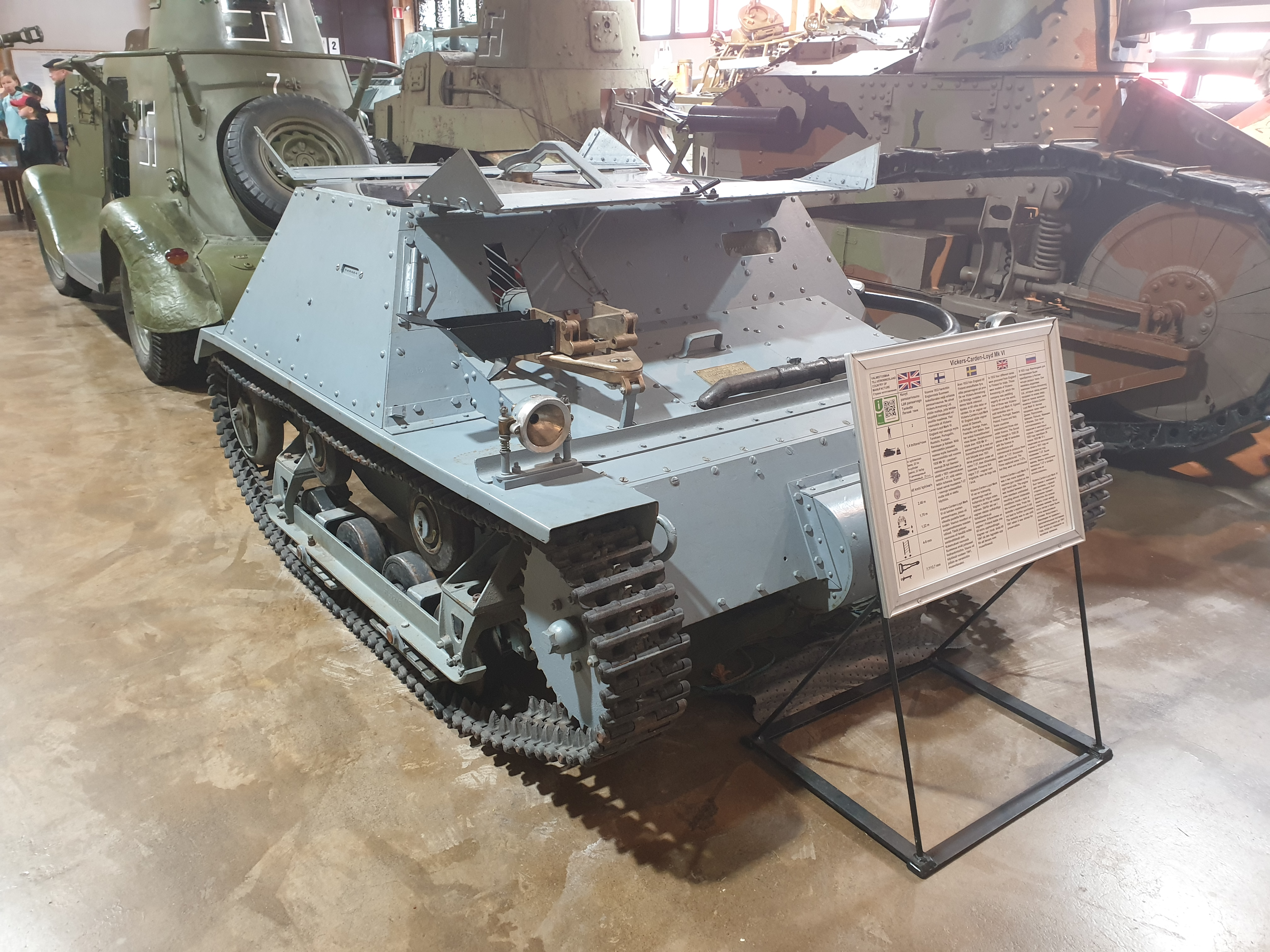
Carden-Loyd Mk VI, bought by Finland in 1933 for trials. Tankette was in use until 1941.

Romania had bought the license to locally produce the Carden Loyd at the Reșița works, but no examples are known to have been built there.

== SA F.R.C. 47 mm ==
Since the Belgian Armed Forces were looking to upgrade their anti-tank capability in the early 1930s, and due to the popularity of the tankette concept, the Carden Loyd Mk VI tankette was chosen as the basis for a first attempt to developing a fully mechanized anti-tank capability. After experimenting with a rather straightforward tractor concept for the Belgian 47 mm Model 1931 anti-tank gun in 1931, a more integrated approach was chosen, resulting in what has probably been the heaviest armed version of the Carden Loyd Mk VI tankette. In 1931, after acquiring six Carden Loyd Mk VI tankettes, two prototype vehicles were modified. One carried the F.R.C. Herstal 47 mm Model 1931 anti-tank gun and one the Canon de 76 FRC, a low-velocity 76 mm infantry gun, in a fixed, forward-facing structure. Pre-production tests of the 76 mm-equipped version found that the large recoil caused a high pitch movement after firing, leading to a completely unstable gun-laying platform. In consequence the 76 mm prototype was rebuilt into the 47 mm-equipped tank destroyer version, but this was not found satisfactory either. Recoil from firing the 47 mm anti-tank gun was too much for the 3-ton vehicle, though less than with the 76 mm version, manning the gun with a two-man team was considered too labour-intensive, the ammunition storage was too small; and, apart from the thin armoured frontal shield, the crew was completely exposed. The added weight of the gun also overtaxed the small engine, and the wear and tear on the whole vehicle was deemed too high. Nevertheless, the experiment provided some valuable experience for the Belgian army. This culminated in the successful T-13 tank destroyer, whose production started in 1935. The six prototype tank destroyer vehicles were also used operationally.

After being fielded by the elite Chasseurs Ardennais mountain division, the vehicles were deemed next to useless in mountainous areas and quickly passed on to the Cyclistes Frontière/Grenswielrijders, a border guard regiment. They were still in use when the Battle of Belgium started in May 1940, albeit from fixed, ambush positions on the west-bank of the river Meuse (Maas) between Vivegnis and Lixhe. They are known to have fired some rounds on the morning of 10 May 1940, the day of the German invasion.

== Drawbacks ==
Due to the suspension design, riding the tankette for 10–20 minutes cross-country caused a headache, while longer journeys often resulted in motion sickness and physical exhaustion. In the Polish TK tankette, the suspension was much improved. Vivian Loyd, who visited Warsaw during the TK's development, called its suspension the best of all vehicles based on his original idea.
