= Ludwig Hahn =

German SS officer & war criminal (1908-1986)

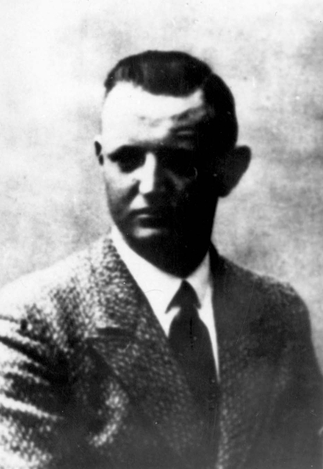
- Born: 23 January 1908; Eitzen, Province of Hanover, German Empire
- Died: 10 November 1986 (aged 78); Ammersbek, West Germany
- Relatives: Johannes Steinhoff (brother-in-law)
- Military career
- Allegiance: Nazi Germany
- Branch: Schutzstaffel
- Service years: 1933–1945
- Rank: SS-Standartenführer
- Unit: Reich Security Main Office (RSHA)
- Commands: Chief of the Gestapo & Deputy Commander of the Security Police (SiPo), Weimar (1937–1939); Kommando Leader, Einsatzkommando 1/I (1939); Commander of the SiPo and SD, Kraków (1940); Gruppen Leader, Einsatzgruppe Griechenland (1941); Commander of the SiPo and SD, Warsaw (1941-44); Gruppen Leader, Einsatzgruppe L (1944-45); Commander of the SiPo and SD, Gau Westphalia-North (1945)
- Conflicts: World War II; Invasion of Poland (1939); Invasion of Greece (1941); Warsaw Ghetto Uprising (1943); Warsaw Uprising (1944); Battle of the Bulge (1944-45); Vistula-Oder Offensive (1945)
- Awards: Iron Cross, 1st and 2nd class War Merit Cross, with swords

Ludwig Hermann Karl Hahn (23 January 1908 – 10 November 1986) was a German SS-Standartenführer, Nazi official, and convicted war criminal. He held numerous positions with the German police and security services (RSHA) over the course of his career with the Schutzstaffel (SS).

As a senior officer of the Sicherheitspolizei (Security Police; SiPo) and Sicherheitsdienst (Security Service; SD) in occupied-Poland, Hahn commanded Einsatzkommado 1/I (September–November 1939) and was directly involved in the liquidation of the Warsaw Ghetto (July–September 1942) and the brutal suppression of both the Warsaw Ghetto Uprising (April–May 1943) and the Warsaw Uprising (August–October 1944).

During postwar investigations against him, Hahn was imprisoned from July 1960 to July 1961 and December 1965 to December 1967. Between 1972 and 1975, Hahn was the subject of two separate war crimes prosecutions in Hamburg, West Germany; both related to atrocities that occurred during his service with the SS in Warsaw. He was ultimately convicted and imprisoned from 1975 to 1983.

== Biography ==
The son of a prosperous farmer of the same name, Hahn was born on 23 January 1908, in the rural town of Eitzen, Uelzen district, Province of Hanover in what was then the German Empire. Hahn attended Volksschule as a youth and was then enrolled at the Lüneburg Realgymnasium, completing his matriculation exam in 1927. Hahn went on to study financial law at the University of Göttingen where he became a member of the National Socialist German Students' League (NSDStB). In February 1930 he joined both the Nazi Party (NSDAP Nr. 194 463) and the Sturmabteilung (SA), where he would rise to the rank of Scharführer (Squad Leader).

After successfully defending his dissertation before the Faculty of Law at the University of Jena, Hahn obtained his doctorate of jurisprudence (Dr. jur.) in July 1932. Afterward, Hahn apprenticed as an assessor in Lüneburg, Naumburg and Weimar. In April 1933, he joined the Schutzstaffel (SS Nr. 65 823) and was assigned to the 17th SS-Standarte (regiment) in Lüneburg and later transferred to the 26th SS-Standarte in Hamburg.

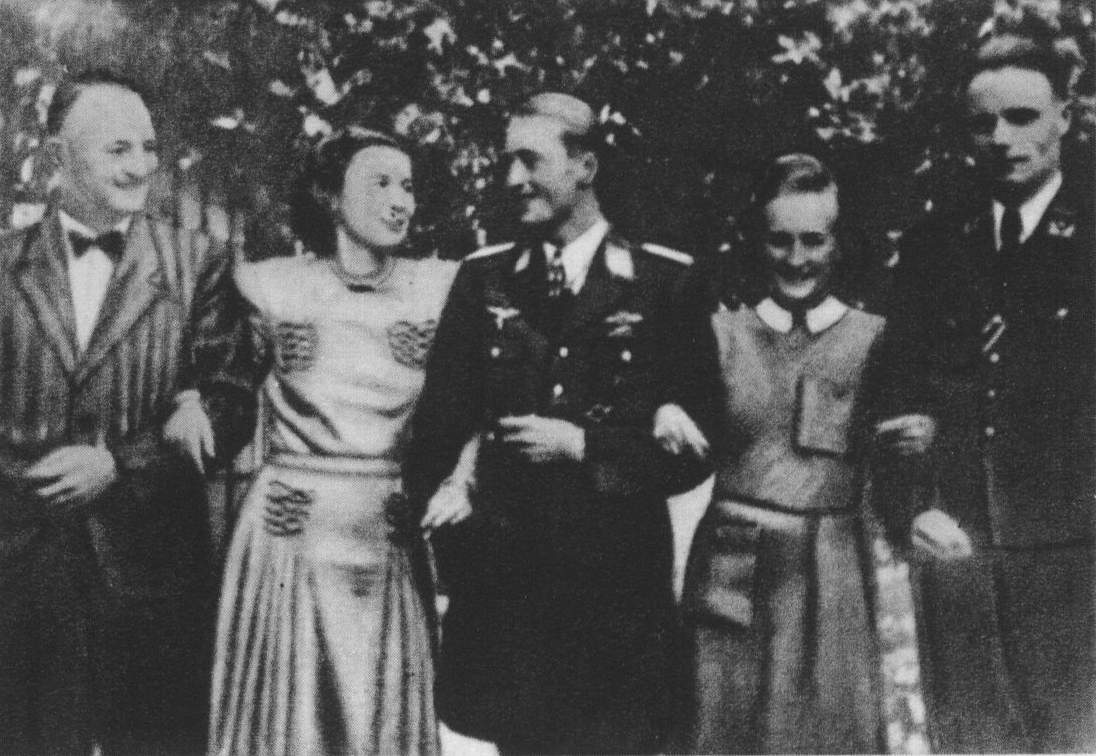
Ludwig Hahn (left), with his wife Charlotte, sister of Johannes Steinhoff (center) in occupied Warsaw.

=== Early Nazi career ===
In December 1933 Hahn was attached to the SS Regional Headquarters in Weimar as a member of the Stabswache (staff guard). After attending the Nazi Party's State School for Leadership and Politics, he was assigned to the Sicherheitsdienst (SD) in May 1934. Hahn qualified as a lawyer after completing his clerkship in April 1935 and became a member of the National Socialist Association of Legal Professionals (NS-Rechtswahrerbund). That same year he married Charlotte Steinhoff, sister of the Luftwaffe fighter pilot Johannes Steinhoff, who later served as a senior General with the postwar West German Air Force and was also Chairman of the NATO Military Committee from 1971 to 1974. The couple would have four children.

Hahn began his career with the Nazi security services in June 1935 when he was retained as a consultant (Referent) at the SD-Hauptamt in Berlin. In January 1936, he was posted to Hanover where he served as Deputy Chief of the city's Gestapo bureau (Stellvertreter Staatspolizeistelle), before returning to Berlin in November of that year to work as a legal advisor (Regierungsassessor) at Gestapo Headquarters. Hahn underwent military-training with the Wehrmacht in Frankfurt an der Oder and was subsequently reassigned to Weimar as Chief of the Gestapo (Kriminalkommissar) and Deputy Commander of the Security Police (Stellvertreter der Polizeipräsident). Hahn maintained both positions from April 1937 to August 1939. He was promoted to the rank of SS-Sturmbannführer (major) und Kriminalrat in September 1938.

During the build-up to World War II he was transferred to Vienna, Austria in preparation for the looming invasion of Poland. He was assigned to Einsatzgruppe I under the command of SS-Brigadeführer Bruno Streckenbach, and was given command of the sub-unit of Einsatzkommando 1/I. During the invasion of Poland in September 1939, Hahn and his unit were attached to the German 14th Army in the territories of Silesia and Malopolska.

== World War II ==
During the September Campaign, Hahn and his Einsatzkommando were heavily involved in the arrests and executions carried out as part of the Intelligenzaktion, a Nazi extermination operation targeting the Polish intelligentsia and other members of the nation's elite. Between September–November 1939, Hahn took part in the mass-killings of Polish public officials, political activists, intellectuals and army officers in Katowice, Sanok, Rzeszów and Podlesie. Einsatzgruppe I was also involved in the Dynów massacre, in which 170–200 Jewish civilians lost their lives. The town's surviving Jewish population was subsequently expelled into Soviet-occupied eastern Poland.

Following the dissolution of Einsatzgruppe I, Hahn served as Stadtkommissar (City Commissioner) for the city of Przemyśl (Prömsel) from November–December 1939. Hahn next took over as Kommandeur der Sicherheitspolizei und des SD (KdS) for the occupied city of Kraków in January 1940. He also served as chief of the "Police Emergency Court" (Standgericht) at Montelupich Prison. In this capacity Hahn was instrumental in the implementation of the German AB-Aktion in Poland.

In August 1940, Hahn was transferred to Bratislava, Slovakia where he had been appointed Sonderbeauftragter (Special Representative) of the Reichsführer-SS. In this position Hahn served as SS leader Heinrich Himmler's personal emissary to the Nazi-allied government of the Slovak Republic under Jozef Tiso. He also acted as a senior advisor to the Slovak Ministry of the Interior. From April–June 1941 Hahn was stationed in Athens, Greece where he commanded Einsatzgruppe Griechenland during the Balkan Campaign. Following the German victory in the offensive, he was promoted to the rank of SS-Obersturmbannführer (lieutenant colonel) and returned to his diplomatic post in Slovakia.

=== Warsaw ===
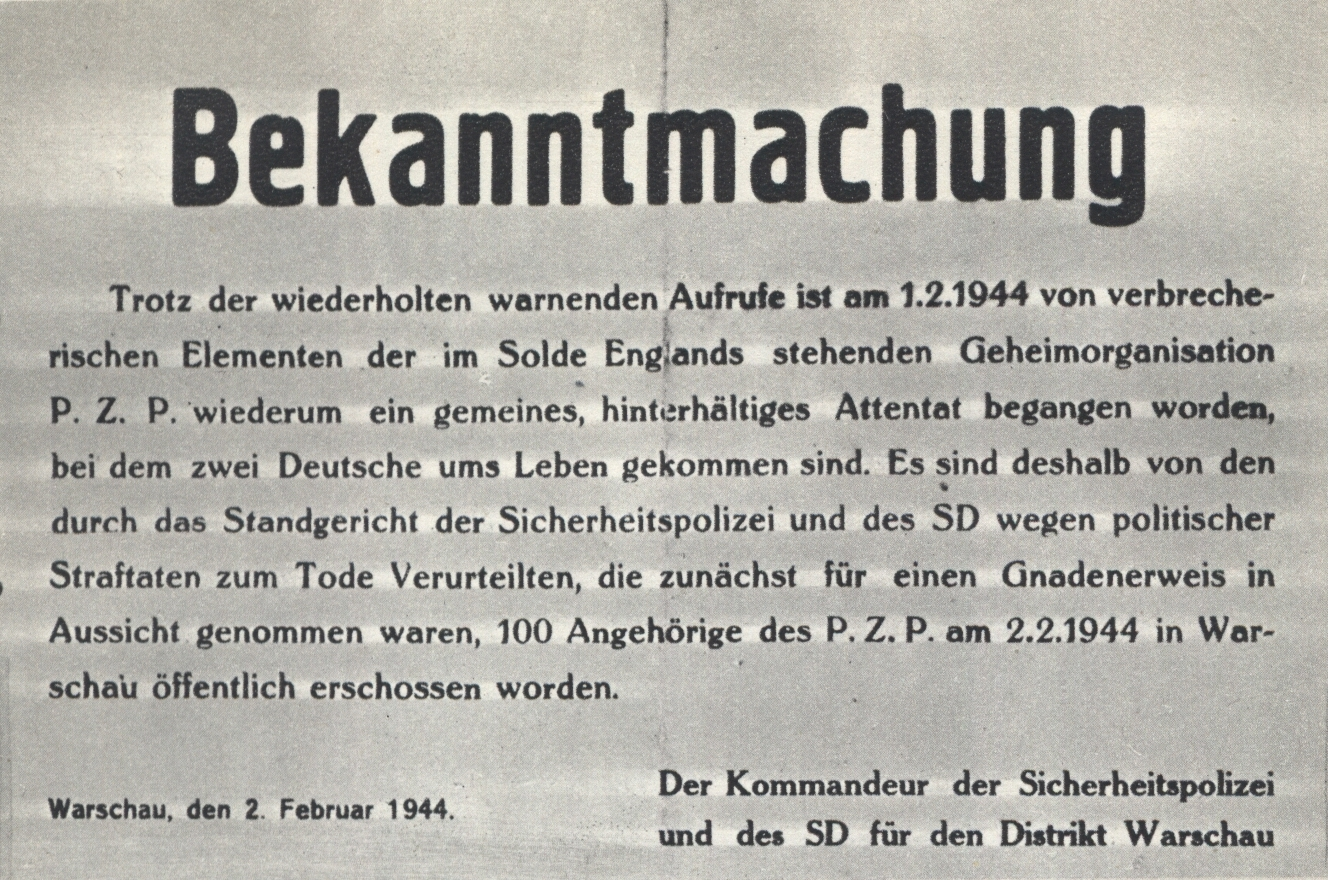
Hahn's written announcement of the execution of 100 Polish hostages as revenge for the death of SS and Police Leader Franz Kutschera, 2 February 1944

In August 1941, Hahn returned to occupied-Poland and was appointed KdS for the city of Warsaw. His headquarters was housed in the former offices of the Ministry of Religious Affairs and Public Education. As Commander of the SiPo and the SD, Hahn would oversee a force of approximately 2,000 individuals; including a staff of 500-600 SS security personnel, as well as around 1,000 Polish police auxiliaries and several guard companies composed mostly of Ukrainian and Cossack collaborators.

During his tenure, Hahn was directly involved in the planning and implementation of the Holocaust in Poland. In the summer of 1942, Hahn collaborated with SS-Brigadeführer Odilo Globocnik and other personnel associated with Operation Reinhard to carry out Grossaktion Warschau, the liquidation of the Warsaw Ghetto. An estimated 265,000 Polish Jews perished between July–September 1942, either in mass-executions carried out by the SS or following their deportation to the extermination camp at Treblinka. This was the single deadliest action taken against the Jews in the course of the Holocaust in occupied-Poland.

As a deputy officer to SS and Police Leader Jürgen Stroop, Hahn also had a leading role in the bloody suppression of the Warsaw Ghetto Uprising in April–May 1943. The brutal pacification of the ghetto by the SS resulted in the deaths of 13,000 Jews either killed in the fighting or executed. In the aftermath of the uprising, Hahn orchestrated the deportation of another 36,000 Jews from Warsaw to the death camps of Treblinka and Majdanek. On 2 February 1944, Hahn would organize the public execution of 300 Polish civilian hostages in reprisal for the assassination of SS and Police Leader Franz Kutschera by members of the Polish Resistance. In April 1944, he was promoted to the rank of SS-Standartenführer (colonel) und Kriminaldirektor. Hahn would also receive the further title of Oberst der Polizei.

During the August–October 1944 Warsaw Uprising by the Polish Home Army, Hahn served with the Waffen-SS, leading a battalion of 700 men in the southern districts of the city and later in the downtown area. He also personally commanded the defense of Warsaw’s heavily fortified government district. Acting on instructions from Himmler, Hahn ordered the mass-killing of Polish civilians in retaliation for the rebellion. An estimated 5 to 10 thousand men, women and children were shot by the SS, mainly in the ruins of the former General Inspectorate of the Armed Forces. Following the capitulation of the uprising, Hahn supervised the deployment of the Verbrennungskommando (Cremation Details); groups of Polish prisoners forced to work clearing bodies and debris from the city's streets. Hahn was awarded the Iron Cross, 1st Class for his service during the uprising.

=== Later service with the SS ===
In November 1944, Hahn departed Warsaw and returned to Germany where he was posted to the Western Front. He was stationed in the town of Cochem and was appointed commander of Einsatzgruppe L which was attached to the German Sixth Panzer Army during the Battle of the Bulge. After the failure of the Ardennes offensive, Hahn was transferred to Army Group Vistula on the Eastern Front to serve as a representative of the SiPo and the SD on the general staff of SS-Obergruppenführer Carl Oberg during the Vistula-Oder offensive. In February 1945, he was reassigned to Dresden, where he briefly served as Stabsführer (chief of staff) to SS-Gruppenführer Ludolf von Alvensleben, the Higher SS and Police Leader for the Elbe.

Hahn was next appointed KdS for the city of Wiesbaden in March 1945. However, he was quickly displaced from this position when the city fell to the Allies and was instead dispatched to Münster, where he took over as KdS for Gau Westphalia-North. Hahn was also tasked with overseeing the security detail for Gauleiter Alfred Meyer. During the closing weeks of the war, Hahn and his staff fled to Hessisch-Oldendorf to escape the Allied advance. He was taken prisoner by the British Army on 12 April 1945 but successfully escaped from custody shortly afterward.

== Postwar life ==
Hahn remained in Germany after 1945 and went into hiding in Bad Eilsen in the British occupation zone, working for several years as a laborer and farmhand. He later moved to Wuppertal where he worked as a salesman with the textile company of Scharpenack & Teschenmacher. He resumed using his real name in 1949. At a denazification hearing in 1950, Hahn's wife Charlotte falsely claimed to British authorities that her husband had been taken prisoner by the Russians and deported to the Soviet Union, prompting the British Army to close its ongoing war crimes investigation of him.

Afterward, Hahn would go on to pursue a successful postwar career as an insurance broker in West Germany. In 1951 his father-in-law arranged for him to take a position as Deputy Director for Organizational Matters with the Hanover branch of Karlsruher Lebensversicherung A.G. He rose to the office of Branch Manager in 1955. Hahn and his family relocated to Hamburg in 1958 where he had been hired as head of the life insurance division of Hans Rudolf Schmidt & Co. GmbH. The family settled in a comfortable home in the borough of Bahrenfeld.

=== Trials and convictions ===
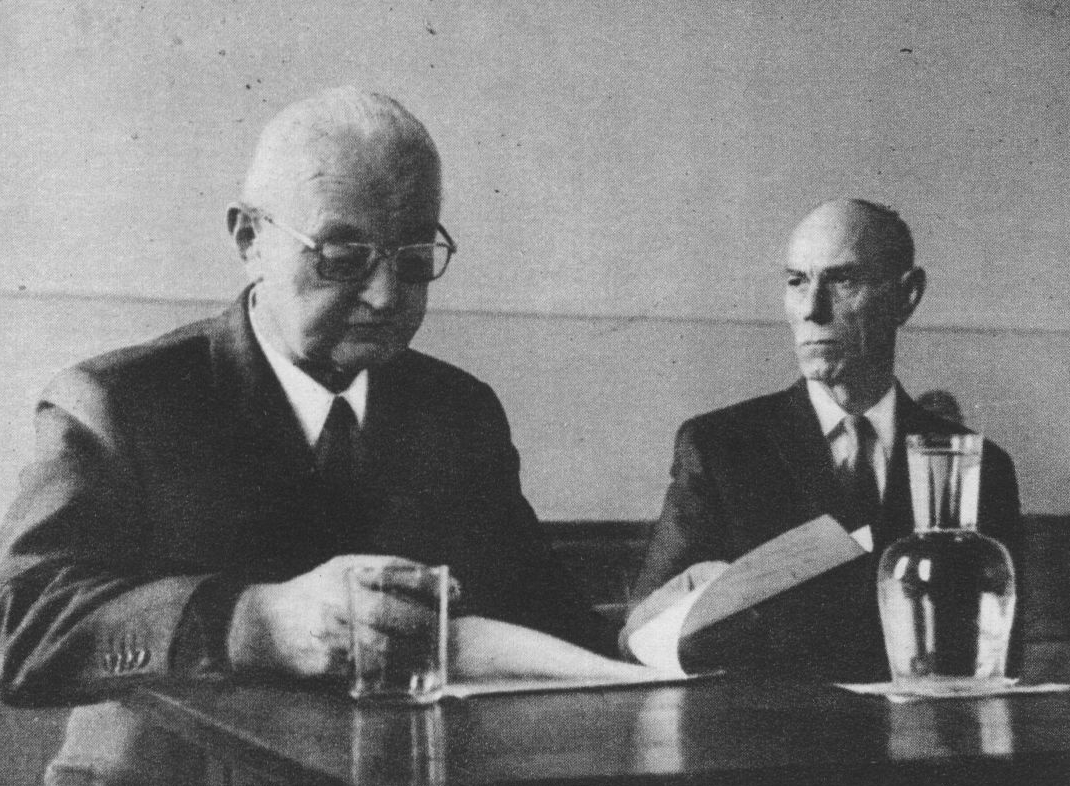
Hahn (left) and SS-Rottenführer Thomas Wippenbeck during their trial in Hamburg, 1972

Hahn's identity was uncovered by journalists in 1960. Following an inquiry by the Central Office of the State Justice Administrations for the Investigation of National Socialist Crimes, Hahn was arrested by the West German federal police for his suspected involvement in the destruction of the Warsaw Ghetto. He was held by West German investigators for a year, however no charges were brought against him due to insufficient evidence and he was released in July 1961. Hahn was arrested a second time in December 1965 and held in pre-trial detention for two years, but was ultimately released again, owing to his poor health. After his release, Hahn briefly worked for the Hamburg branch of Investors Overseas Service. He retired in 1967.

It was not until May 1972 that Hahn was successfully charged with war crimes by the Higher Regional Court of Hamburg. The now 65-year-old Hahn was found guilty in connection with wartime atrocities committed at the Pawiak prison in Warsaw, namely the execution of 100 Polish political prisoners who were shot on his orders on 21 July 1944. Hahn was sentenced to 12 years in prison in June 1973 but petitioned the court for an appeal of the verdict. After a two-year review of the trial and the evidence, Hahn's appeal was rejected by the West German judiciary and he entered prison in March 1975.

During the appeals process, Hahn was also on trial in a different West German court; this case surrounded his alleged role in the deportation of an estimated 230,000 Jews from the Warsaw Ghetto to Treblinka. The proceedings opened in October 1974, and Hahn was once more found guilty. On 4 July 1975, he was given a further sentence of life imprisonment. Suffering from cancer, Hahn was granted early release from prison in September 1983. He died in Ammersbek on 10 November 1986.

== Summary of SS career ==
Dates of rank

- SS-Standartenführer, Regierungs- und Kriminaldirektor, Oberst der Polizei (20 April 1944)
- SS-Obersturmbannführer (9 November 1941)
  - Oberregierungs- und Kriminalrat (12 September 1941)
- SS-Sturmbannführer, Regierungs und Kriminalrat (26 September 1938)
- SS-Hauptsturmführer und Kriminalrat (1 August 1938)
- SS-Obersturmführer und Kriminalkommissar (30 January 1938)
- SS-Untersturmführer (20 April 1936)
- SS-Hauptscharführer (9 November 1935)
- SS-Unterscharführer (1 June 1935)
- SS-Rottenführer (9 November 1934)
  - SA-Scharführer (December 1930)

Awards and decorations

- Iron Cross, First Class (9 October 1944)
- War Merit Cross with Swords (30 January 1943)
- Iron Cross, Second Class (6 July 1940)
- Ehrendegen der Reichsfuhrer-SS
- Totenkopfring der SS
- Honor Chevron for the Old Guard
