= Hans Döring (SS-Brigadeführer) =

SS and Police Leader and SS-Brigadeführer

- Born: 31 August 1901; Hanover, Kingdom of Prussia, German Empire
- Died: 2 July 1970 (age 68); Nuremberg, Bavaria, West Germany
- Military career
- Allegiance: Nazi Germany
- Branch: Freikorps; Schutzstaffel; Allgemeine SS; Waffen-SS
- Service years: 1919; 1929–1945
- Rank: SS-Brigadeführer and Generalmajor of Police; Hauptsturmführer of the Waffen-SS
- Commands: SS and Police Leader, "Stalino-Donezgebiet"
- Conflicts: World War II
- Awards: Iron Cross, 1st and 2nd class War Merit Cross, 2nd class with swords

Johannes Rudolf Georg Hans Döring (31 August 1901 – 2 July 1970) was a German Nazi Party politician, SS-Brigadeführer and officer in the Waffen-SS. He held important SS commands in several major cities of Nazi Germany and served as an SS and Police Leader in Stalino (today, Donetsk) during the Second World War.

== Early life ==
Döring was born in Hanover the son of a police official. He attended the Volksschule and Realgymnasium in Wiesbaden between 1907 and 1918. After earning his Abitur, he served with a naval Freikorps unit and then began a commercial apprenticeship. He worked in Wiesbaden in various businesses as a laborer, a freight shipper and a salesman between 1920 and 1931. In 1931, he moved to Darmstadt, and the following year to Vadenrod in Schwamtal, where he continued to work as a shipping agent. On 15 November 1928, Döring joined the Sturmabteilung (SA), the Nazi paramilitary unit, and he was admitted to the Nazi Party on 1 December (membership number 106,490).

== Peacetime SS and political career ==
Döring transferred from the SA to the Schutzstaffel (SS) on 6 January 1929 (membership number 1,327), becoming an early member of this elite Nazi organization. His first SS assignment was with the local unit in Wiesbaden. On 15 January 1930, he was commissioned an SS-Untersturmführer, rapidly advancing to SS-Sturmbannführer by 20 July. On 8 March 1931, he was promoted to SS-Standartenführer and headed the 2nd SS-Standarte in Frankfurt from July 1931 to the end of the year. He then moved to Kassel where he led the 35th SS-Standarte from 1 July 1932 to 15 September 1933. At that time, he was transferred to become the commander of SS-Abschnitte (District) II in Dresden, which oversaw three SS-Standarten. Promoted to SS-Oberführer on 9 November 1933, he remained in the Dresden command until 6 May 1935. His next posting was as the commander of Abschnitt XXII in Allenstein (today, Olsztyn, Poland) where he remained until 15 March 1936. He next took command of the 31st SS-Standarte in Landshut until 1 January 1937, and then began a two-year posting as commander of SS-Abschnitt XVIII in Halle, where he remained until 1 January 1939. There followed a brief period as leader of SS-Abschnitt IX in Nuremberg until 1 March 1939 when he was made commander of the prestigious SS-Abschnitt I, with headquarters in Munich, the home city of the Nazi Party. He would formally retain this command until 1 October 1942.

In addition to his SS commands, Döring was also active in politics. From November 1931 to June 1932, he sat as a Nazi member of the Landtag of Hesse in Darmstadt before it was abolished in the Nazis' process of centralizing their power over the German states. From November 1933 to March 1936, Döring served as a deputy in the Reichstag for electoral constituency 28 (Dresden–Bautzen).

== Second World War ==
On 10 June 1941, Döring joined the Waffen-SS, serving with the Leibstandarte SS Adolf Hitler (LSSAH) and being commissioned an Untersturmführer of reserves on 9 November 1941. He underwent police training with the main office of the Ordnungspolizei and, on 19 November 1941, he was appointed the first SS and Police Leader (SSPF) in "Stalino-Donezgebiet", reporting to the Higher SS and Police Leader (HSSPF) of Russland-Süd (southern Russia), SS-Obergruppenführer Hans-Adolf Prützmann. In this post, Döring commanded all SS personnel and police in his jurisdiction, including the Ordnungspolizei (Orpo; regular uniformed police), the SD (intelligence service) and the SiPo (security police), which included the Gestapo (secret police).

During his tenure as SSPF, the German security forces forced the Jews of the Stalino region into ghettos, and Einsatzgruppe C subsequently conducted mass killing of the inhabitants, as the following illustrates:

In 1939, the Jews numbered 24,991 (total population 466,268) ... On October 20, 1941, the town was occupied by the Germans, who held it until September 8, 1943. A large ghetto was set up and its inhabitants were kept without food or medical aid, with hundreds dying every day. In December 1941, Einzatzcommando-6 murdered several hundred Jews. In April 1942, the liquidation of the Donetsk ghetto commenced. The Germans took the Jews to the abandoned Maria mine and threw most of them down the shafts alive. They also used gas vans, throwing the bodies into the mine. Some 15,000 Jews were murdered.

On 20 April 1942, Döring was promoted to the rank of SS-Brigadeführer and Generalmajor of Police. He held the posting in Stalino until replaced by SS-Brigadeführer Willy Tensfeld on 19 May 1943. He returned to Waffen-SS service in September 1943. Promoted to Hauptsturmführer of reserves on 20 April 1944, he served as a company and battalion commander in the 16th SS Panzergrenadier Division Reichsführer-SS in Italy and Hungary until the end of the war in Europe on 8 May 1945. During the course of the war, he was awarded both classes of the Iron Cross and the War Merit Cross, 2nd class with swords. Little is known of his postwar life.

SS Ranks
| Date | Rank |
|---|---|
| 15 January 1930 | SS-Untersturmführer |
| 20 July 1930 | SS-Sturmbannführer |
| 8 March 1931 | SS-Standartenführer |
| 9 November 1933 | SS-Oberführer |
| 10 June 1941 | Untersturmführer der Waffen-SS |
| 20 April 1942 | SS-Brigadeführer und Generalmajor der polizei |
| 20 April 1944 | Hauptsturmführer der Waffen-SS |

== Sources ==
- Lilla, Joachim; Döring, Martin; Schulz, Andreas (2004). Statisten in Uniform: Die Mitglieder des Reichstags 1933–1945. Ein biographisches Handbuch. Unter Einbeziehung der völkischen und nationalsozialistischen Reichstagsabgeordneten ab Mai 1924. Düsseldorf: Droste. ISBN 3-7700-5254-4.
- Schiffer Publishing Ltd., ed. (2000). SS Officers List: SS-Standartenführer to SS-Oberstgruppenführer (As of 30 January 1942). Schiffer Military History Publishing. ISBN 0-7643-1061-5.
- Yerger, Mark C. (1997). Allgemeine-SS: The Commands, Units and Leaders of the General SS. Schiffer Publishing Ltd. ISBN 0-7643-0145-4.
