= Johann-Erasmus Freiherr von Malsen-Ponickau =

SS and Police Leader and SS-Brigadeführer

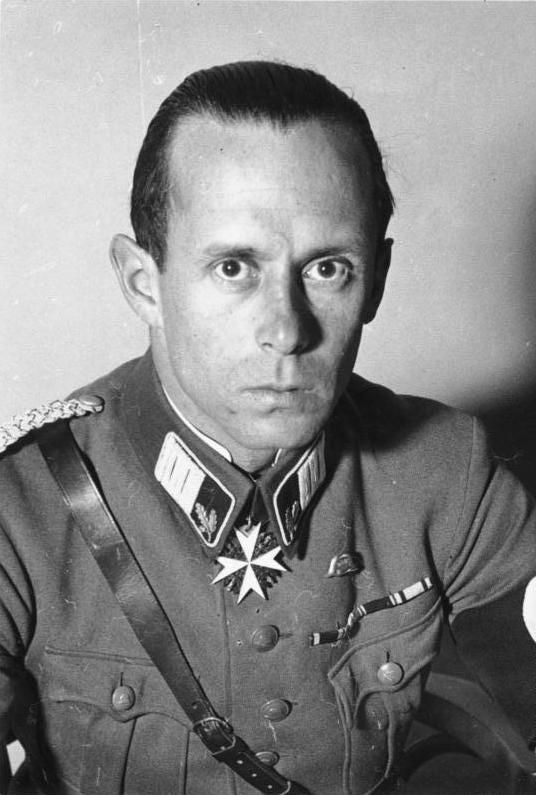
- Malsen-Ponickau in the uniform of Der Stahlhelm and the Knight of Honour Cross of the Order of St. John (1933)
- Born: 5 June 1895; Munich, Kingdom of Bavaria, German Empire
- Died: 12 June 1956 (age 61); Munich, West Germany
- Military career
- Allegiance: German Empire; Nazi Germany
- Branch: Imperial German Army; Schutzstaffel
- Service years: 1914–1919; 1930–1945
- Rank: Rittmeister; SS-Brigadeführer
- Commands: SS and Police Leader, "Istrien"; Police Director, Frankfurt; Police President Posen; Halle
- Conflicts: World War I World War II
- Awards: Iron Cross, 2nd class Knight of Honour, Order of St. John

Johann-Erasmus Georg Adalbert Freiherr von Malsen-Ponickau (5 June 1895 – 12 June 1956) was a German Nazi SS-Brigadeführer and Police President in several German cities. During the Second World War, he served as the SS and Police Leader in Istria. Following the war, he was imprisoned for seven years in Poland.

== Early life ==
Malsen-Polnickau was born in Munich, the son of Theobald Freiherr von Malsen (1867–1930), a nobleman and officer in the Royal Bavarian Army and his wife, also of noble birth, née Johanna Olga Freiin von Ponickau (1873–1940). He attended volksschule in Munich, followed by gymnasium in Landau and a military academy in Karlsruhe through 1912. This was followed by two years at the elite Preußische Hauptkadettenanstalt (Prussian Main Cadet Institute) in Lichterfelde. In September 1914 shortly after the outbreak of the First World War, Malsen-Polnickau was commissioned a Leutnant in the 20th (1st Baden) Life Dragoon Regiment of the German Imperial Army. He saw combat on both the eastern and western fronts, and was awarded the Iron Cross, 2nd class. From April 1915 to July 1918, he was commander of a machine gun platoon. From July to the end of the war in November 1918, he was an orderly officer and adjutant in the 215th Infantry Regiment. He returned to Germany in January 1919 and remained at garrison duty in Karlsruhe until being discharged from the service in April 1919 with the rank of Oberleutnant.

Malsen-Polnickau then became active in the German veterans organization, Der Stahlhelm. From April to June 1919, he served with the Freikorps Epp, a right-wing paramilitary unit that took part in the suppression of the Bavarian Soviet Republic. He then undertook a one-year agriculture and forestry internship in Munich and Hohenheim and became a member of the Corps Rheno-Palatia, a German Student Corps. He went on to manage the family estate, Schloss Osterberg in Swabia, from 1922.

== Peacetime SS career ==
Malsen-Ponickau had joined the Nazi Party sometime in 1922, leaving it after the failed Beer Hall Putsch of November 1923. He rejoined the Party (membership number 213,542) on 1 March 1930. At that time, he was appointed Ortsgruppenleiter (Local Group Leader) in Niederraunau where he served through July 1932. He joined the SS (SS number 3,914) on 27 November 1930. Assigned to the 29th SS-Standarte in Niederraunau, he became its first leader on 18 January 1931, and was commissioned an SS-Sturmführer on 1 February 1931. After further promotions, on 11 August 1932 he advanced to the command of the prestigious First SS-Abschnitt in Munich, the headquarters of the Nazi Party, where he oversaw nine SS-Standarten.

After the Nazi seizure of power, Malsen-Ponickau was transferred to the command of SS-Abschnitt IX in Nuremberg on 20 April 1933 and also became acting chief of police in Nuremberg-Fürth. After a conflict with Nuremberg Gauleiter Julius Streicher, Malsen-Ponickau was recalled from his posts and transferred to the staff of Reichsfuhrer-SS Heinrich Himmler on 15 August 1933. Although promoted to SS-Brigadeführer that same date, this would be his last promotion, and he remained the senior-most holder of this rank. He was next assigned from 15 January 1934 to 20 September 1936 as the commander of SS-Abschnitt X with headquarters in Stuttgart. He sought election to the Reichstag in March 1936 and April 1938, but did not receive a mandate. In March 1936 he also joined the 18th Cavalry Regiment in Bad Cannstatt as an Oberleutnant of reserves and was promoted to Rittmeister of reserves on 1 March 1938. In April 1938 he was transferred to become the Acting Police Director in Frankfurt (Oder), and this appointment was made permanent in March 1939.

== Second World War ==
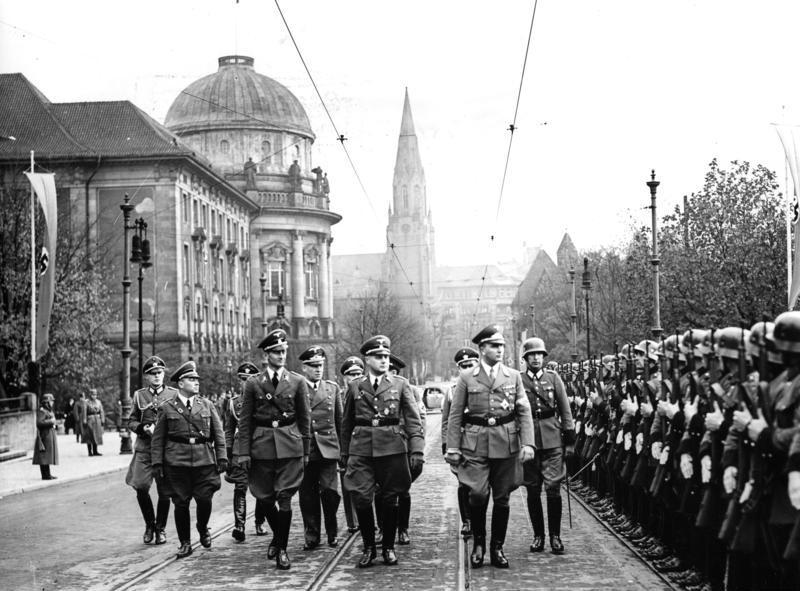
Inspection of an honor company from the Wehrmacht in Posen in November 1939. In the front row from left to right: Johann-Erasmus von Malsen-Ponickau, Wilhelm Koppe, and Arthur Greiser.

Malsen-Ponickau remained in Frankfurt until 31 May 1940 when he was named Police President of Posen (today, Poznań) in the Reichsgau Wartheland which had been annexed from Poland. He also headed the Kriminalpolizei (KriPo) there. On 28 June 1943 he was transferred to Halle (Saale) where he also served as Police President and KriPo commander until 20 December. From February 1944, Malsen-Ponickau was Himmler's Besonderer Vertreter (special representative) to the Higher SS and Police Leader (HSSPF) of the Operational Zone of the Adriatic Littoral, SS-Gruppenführer Odilo Globocnik, in Trieste. On 27 October 1944 he was named SS and Polizeigebietkommandeur (Police Area Commander) "Istrien" with his seat in Pola (today, Pula). He remained in this post until the end of the war in Europe.

After the end of the war, Malsen-Ponickau was taken prisoner by the Americans and extradited to Poland in 1946, where he was put on trial. He was acquitted of war crimes, but received a 7-year sentence for being a member of the SS, which had been deemed a criminal organization by the International Military Tribunal. After his release, Malsen-Ponickau returned to Munich, where he lived until his death.

== SS ranks ==
SS ranks
Rank	Date
SS-Sturmführer	1 February 1931
SS-Sturmbannführer	1 June 1931
SS-Standartenführer	18 October 1931
SS-Oberführer	11 August 1932
SS-Brigadeführer	15 August 1933

== Sources ==
- Klee, Ernst (2007). Das Personenlexikon zum Dritten Reich. Wer war was vor und nach 1945. Frankfurt-am-Main: Fischer-Taschenbuch-Verlag. ISBN 978-3-596-16048-8.
- Malinowski, Stephan (2003). Vom König Zum Führer:Sozialer Niedergang und politische Radikalisierung im deutschen Adel zwischen Kaiserreich und NS-Staat. Berlin: Fischer-Taschenbuch-Verlag. ISBN 978-3-050-03554-3.
- Schiffer Publishing Ltd., ed. (2000). SS Officers List: SS-Standartenführer to SS-Oberstgruppenführer (As of 30 January 1942). Schiffer Military History Publishing. ISBN 0-7643-1061-5.
- Yerger, Mark C. (1997). Allgemeine-SS: The Commands, Units and Leaders of the General SS. Schiffer Publishing Ltd. ISBN 0-7643-0145-4.
