= Tank warfare in the Chaco War =

The Chaco War (1932–35), between Bolivia and Paraguay, was the first South American conflict in which tanks were employed. They originated exclusively from Bolivia, but Paraguay operated tanks captured from Bolivia during the war.

== Tanks ==
The Vickers light tanks bought by Bolivia were the Type A and Type B, which differ only in the turret type. The tanks were commissioned into the Bolivian army in December 1932, and were originally painted in camouflage patterns. Their factory numbers were VAE532 for the Type A, VAE446 and VAE 447 for the Type Bs. The Type A had twin cylindrical turrets, each armed with a Vickers .303 water-cooled machine gun. The turrets were mounted side-by-side, each covering 120° to each side of the longitudinal axis of the tank. These were crewed by four people: two machine gunners, a commander, and a driver. While the Type B had a single turret, armed with a short low-velocity QFSA 3 pounder cannon and a coaxial .303 water-cooled machine gun. This turret contained two crew members, a commander and a gunner, who also served as a loader. The tanks were fitted with a two-channel radio set, whose use was hampered by the wet environment.

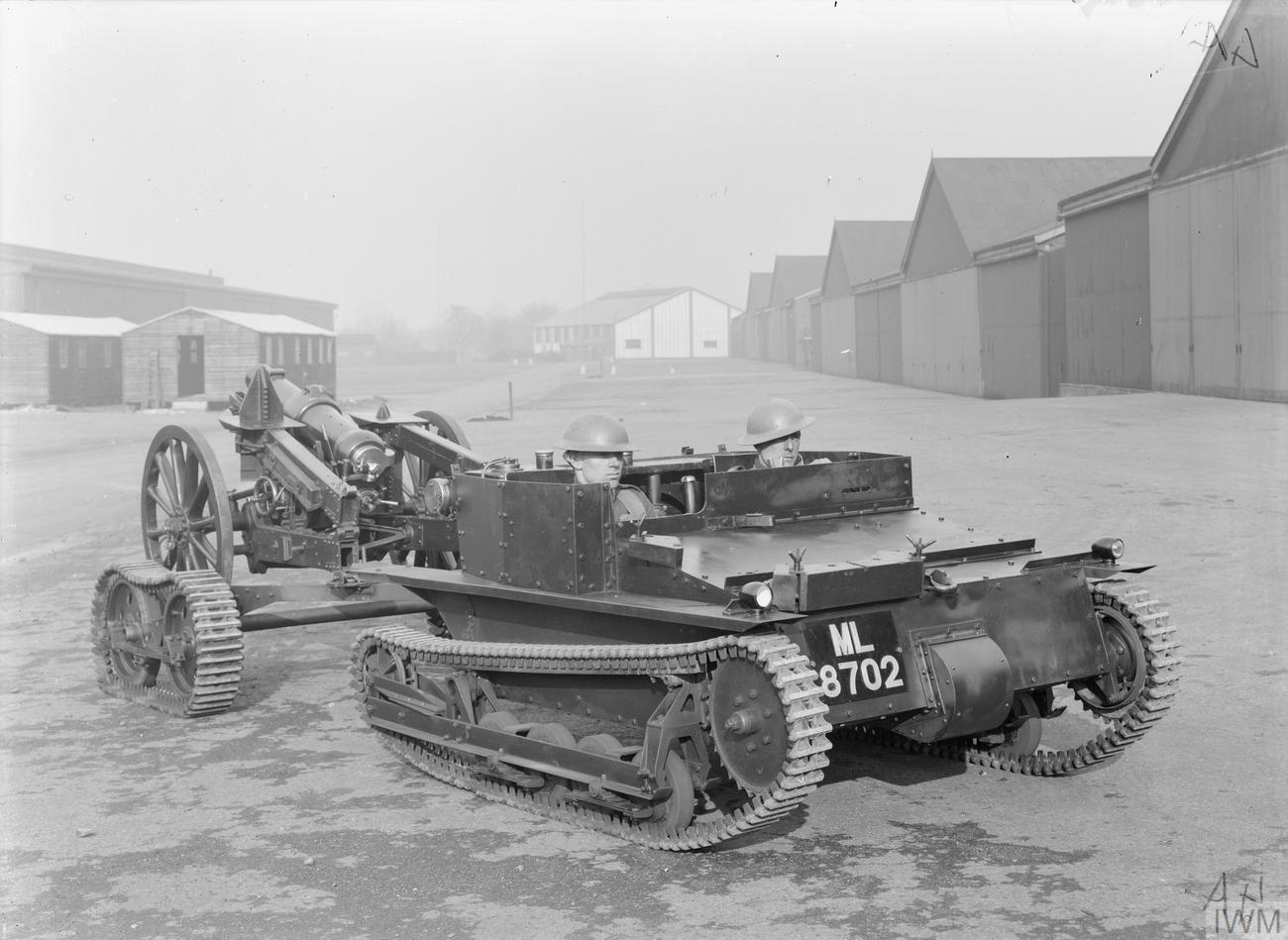
A Carden-Loyd tankette towing a howitzer

Bolivia also received at least two Carden-Lloyd tankettes armed with Vickers .303 machine guns. These vehicles had not originally been designed as assault vehicles, but as mobile platforms for emplacing machine guns on the battlefield. However, improvements in the gun mounts allowed them to act as mobile firing platforms. Its armor was minimal and offered little protection for the crew, while its area of fire was very limited, as the machine gun was fixed facing forward.

Between the end of the fighting in 1935 and the signing of the Peace Treaty in 1938, Bolivia acquired a dozen Ansaldo L3/35 tankettes from Italy, whose design was based on the Carden-Lloyd.

At least one Renault FT demonstration unit arrived in La Paz in 1931, but it was never deployed to the Chaco.

== Operational history ==
The Bolivian Army had a few German instructors. (They were among the numerous German missions, who evaded the clauses of the Treaty of Versailles by providing services to Bolivia.) Some, such as Major Wilhelm "Wim" Brandt and Major Achim R. von Kries, commanded Bolivian tanks, as did Austrian Major Walter Kohn. At least two mechanics of the armoured unit were Chileans. The rest of the tank crews were drawn from Bolivian volunteers, who received eight weeks training.

The armoured assets first saw combat on 13 September 1932 near Boquerón, when a Carden-Lloyd tankette, commanded by Kohn, tried to break the perimeter at Yujra to aid Colonel Marzana's troops. The Carden-Lloyd had been supporting infantry patrols in no-man's-land before the battle.

In July 1933, at the Second Battle of Nanawa, the Vickers 6-ton achieved some success when a Type B tank broke into the core of the Paraguayan defenses, after wiping out a number of wooden pillboxes. The other Type B was left behind by the Bolivian Army, after its transmission was damaged by an artillery round. The derelict tank was ultimately blown up by Paraguayan sappers on 8 July. Although the Paraguayan infantry was no match for the Vickers, Bolivian reports acknowledge that small-arms fire ricocheting off the tanks sapped their crews' morale. The twin-turret tank also sustained some damaged from a volley of rifle fire, while virtually all tank crewmen suffered injuries of some degree from bullet splinters. Major von Kries was seriously wounded. The Paraguayan army used 7.62mm armour-piercing rounds during the engagement. As for the tankettes, one was disabled by machine-gun fire and another became stuck in a ditch — after which the tankettes were withdrawn from the frontlines.

In August 1933, the surviving tanks led a successful thrust overrunning the enemy outpost of Pirijayo (known as Pirizal by the Paraguayans). After this action, the Type A was placed in an open area to hold off any Paraguayan counterattack from the nearby woods; while the Type B returned to the rearguard, due to mechanical failure.

15 November saw the last operational use of the Vickers, when the Type A's machine guns defeated an assault of the Paraguayan infantry near Alihuatá.

On 10 December 1933, during the battle of Campo Vía, the two remainings Vickers tanks were ambushed and captured by a squadron of the Cavalry Regiment "General San Martin" (made up mostly of Argentine volunteers).

On 27 December 1933, during the battle of Kilometer 7 to Saavedra, after leaving his flamethrower-equipped tankette due to heat and fighting on foot with the infantry, Major Kohn died in an assault on a machine gun nest.

By 1934, Paraguayan forces had captured so many Bolivian tanks and armored vehicles that Bolivia was forced to purchase a quantity of Steyr Solothurn 15mm anti-tank rifles in order to repel their own armor, now turned against their own positions.

== Tactics and lessons ==
The use of armoured vehicles in the Chaco was relatively ineffective due to their scant numbers, the lack of doctrine or experience in their use, the harsh climate and bushy terrain of the Chaco, and the logistic difficulties faced by the Bolivian Army. As seen in Europe during and after the First World War, many Bolivian officers were not convinced of the tank's potential, being such a novel weapon and acquired at the exclusive insistence of General Kundt.

Back in Germany, Wim Brandt wrote about his experiences in the military magazine Beihefte zum Militar-Wochenblatt. He criticized the Vickers engine-cooling system, armour, gunsight, and tracks. According to Brandt, the only remarkable feature of the 6-ton tanks was their suspension dampers. He advised against firing the tank guns while moving, a guideline that became standard during World War II. Brandt also recommended that all crew members undertake training as drivers.

The tanks were employed primarily as part of artillery units, almost as self-propelled support pieces, and infantry units were not trained to operate jointly with armoured units. The two units captured at Campo Vía had been deployed without supporting infantry protection.

== Aftermath ==
The 3 pounder gun turret of the abandoned Type B was removed by Paraguayan technicians and displayed in the War Museum at Asunción. The captured Type A was also displayed as part of a war memorial in Constitution square at Asunción, while the second Type B was sold by the Paraguayan government to the Republican side of the Spanish Civil War, in January 1937. In 1990, Paraguay returned the tank and the turret to Bolivia.

== See also ==
- Vickers 6-Ton
- Vickers machine gun
- Vickers
- History of tanks
- Tank

== Bibliography ==
- Farcau, Bruce W. (1996). The Chaco War: Bolivia and Paraguay, 1932-1935. Greenwood Publishing Group. ISBN 0-275-95218-5
- Historia de Bolivia, 5º edición, editorial Gisbert. (in Spanish)
- Sigal Fogliani, Ricardo (1997). Blindados Argentinos, de Uruguay y Paraguay. Ayer y Hoy, Buenos Aires. ISBN 987-95832-7-2 (in Spanish)
- Tanques Vickers (in Spanish)
- Light Tank Vickers 6 Ton
