= Karl Zech =

SS and Police Leader and SS-Gruppenführer

- Born: 6 February 1892; Swinemünde (today, Świnoujście), Province of Pomerania, Kingdom of Prussia, German Empire
- Died: 1 April 1944 (age 52); Altenburg, Nazi Germany
- Military career
- Allegiance: German Empire; Weimar Republic; Nazi Germany
- Branch: Imperial German Army; Reichswehr; Schutzstaffel
- Service years: 1910–1919; 1931–1944
- Rank: Hauptmann; SS-Gruppenführer
- Commands: SS and Police Leader, "Krakau"; Police President of Essen
- Conflicts: World War I World War II
- Awards: Iron Cross, 1st and 2nd class War Merit Cross, 2nd class with Swords; Wound Badge, in black

Karl Zech (6 February 1892 – 1 April 1944) was a German SS-Gruppenführer and Police President of Essen who served as the first SS and Police Leader of Krakau (today, Kraków) during the Second World War. Convicted of corruption and dismissed from the SS, he committed suicide in 1944.

== Early life ==
Zech was born in Swinemünde (today, Świnoujście) and after graduating from the realgymnasium there, joined Infantry Regiment 62 (3rd Upper Silesian) of the Imperial German Army in 1910. Promoted to Leutnant in 1911, he was a company commander in the First World War with that regiment, and later became a staff officer and brigade adjutant. During the war, he earned the Iron Cross, 1st and 2nd class and the Wound Badge in black. After the end of the war in 1918, he was a member from December 1918 to June 1919 of the Landesschützenkorps, a Freikorps unit that was involved in the suppression of the Spartacist uprising. From June to October 1919 he worked on the staff of Reichswehr Brigade 4. He left the service with the rank of Hauptmann on 1 October 1919, and returned to civilian life working as a miner and mining official.

== Peacetime SS, police and political career ==
From 1921 to 1929 Zech was a member of the paramilitary veterans association, Der Stahlhelm. On 1 January 1931, he joined the Nazi Party (membership number 408,563) and on 19 January 1931 the SS (member number 4,555). Commissioned an SS-Sturmführer on 31 March 1931, Zech led units of the 25th SS-Standarte, headquartered in Essen, rapidly rising through the ranks to command a company, a battalion and, finally the entire Standarte from 24 August 1931 to 13 July 1932. His next advancement came from 6 October 1932 to 1 October 1937 when he commanded the SS-Abschnitt (District) V, also headquartered in Essen, overseeing eight Standarten. After the Nazi seizure of power, Zech was also named Police President in Essen, serving from 14 July 1933 to 1 October 1937 when he was succeeded by Fritz Schlessmann. At that point, he moved to SS headquarters in Berlin where he became the Chief of Amt I, the SS Leadership Office (Führungsamt) within the SS Main Office. Soon after, he attained his highest rank of SS-Gruppenführer on 30 January 1938. He retained the Berlin posting until October 1940 when the SS Main Office was reorganized, simultaneously serving as commander of the SD in Oberabschnitt (Main District) "Ost," (later renamed "Spree") also based in Berlin.

Zech was also active in electoral politics for the Nazi Party. From April 1932 to its abolition in 1933, Zech sat as a Nazi Party member of the Landtag of Prussia and, on 12 November 1933, he was elected to the Reichstag from electoral constituency 23 (Düsseldorf West). He would continue to be reelected to this body through the last Reichstag election of April 1938.

== Second World War ==
After the German invasion of Poland, Zech was named Police President of Krakau on 27 September 1939 and, on 24 November, he was made the first SS and Police Leader (SSPF) of the Krakau District, located in the General Government. In this post, he commanded all SS personnel and police in his jurisdiction, including the Ordnungspolizei (Orpo; regular uniformed police), the SD (intelligence service) and the SiPo (security police), which included the Gestapo (secret police).

Zech's tenure as SSPF in Krakau coincided with the first phase of the Holocaust in which the occupying Germans undertook actions to isolate, exploit and persecute the Jews of the city. In May 1940, the SS and police forces began to relocate Jews from the city to the outlying countryside and began to concentrate the remaining inhabitants in what would become the Kraków Ghetto. Relocations were at first voluntary, but when the authorities deemed that insufficient numbers had left, mandatory expulsions began to be enforced after 15 August.

Shortly after, on 1 October 1940, Zech was replaced as SSPF by SS-Oberführer Hans Schwedler and moved back to Germany. He served on the staff of Reichsfuhrer-SS Heinrich Himmler until November 1942 when he was given a staff position with Oberabschnitt "Elbe," headquartered in Dresden. He also was given the posts of Commercial Director and Deputy Operations Manager at the Altenburg plant of the HASAG armaments company, which was one of the largest arms producers and users of forced labor in Germany. Following allegations of misappropriation of food and ration cards, on 28 February 1944 he was expelled from the Nazi Party, on 11 March from the Reichstag and on 14 March from the SS. On 1 April 1944, a Special Court (Sondergericht) in Weimar sentenced him to four years in prison. Zech committed suicide after the verdict was announced.

SS and Police Ranks
Rank	Date
SS-Sturmführer	31 January 1931
SS-Sturmbannführer	4 July 1931
SS-Standartenführer	8 August 1931
SS-Oberführer	6 October 1932
SS-Brigadeführer	1 January 1934
SS-Gruppenführer	30 January 1938

== Sources ==
- Hilberg, Raul (2003). The destruction of the European Jews (Third ed.). New Haven: Yale University Press. ISBN 978-0-300-09592-0.
- Klee, Ernst (2007). Das Personenlexikon zum Dritten Reich. Wer war was vor und nach 1945. Frankfurt-am-Main: Fischer-Taschenbuch-Verlag. ISBN 978-3-596-16048-8.
- Lilla, Joachim; Döring, Martin; Schulz, Andreas (2004). Statisten in Uniform: Die Mitglieder des Reichstags 1933–1945. Ein biographisches Handbuch. Unter Einbeziehung der völkischen und nationalsozialistischen Reichstagsabgeordneten ab Mai 1924. Düsseldorf: Droste. ISBN 3-7700-5254-4.
- Schiffer Publishing Ltd., ed. (2000). SS Officers List: SS-Standartenführer to SS-Oberstgruppenführer (As of 30 January 1942). Schiffer Military History Publishing. ISBN 0-7643-1061-5.
- Yerger, Mark C. (1997). Allgemeine-SS: The Commands, Units and Leaders of the General SS. Schiffer Publishing Ltd. ISBN 0-7643-0145-4.
