= 18th SS-Standarte =

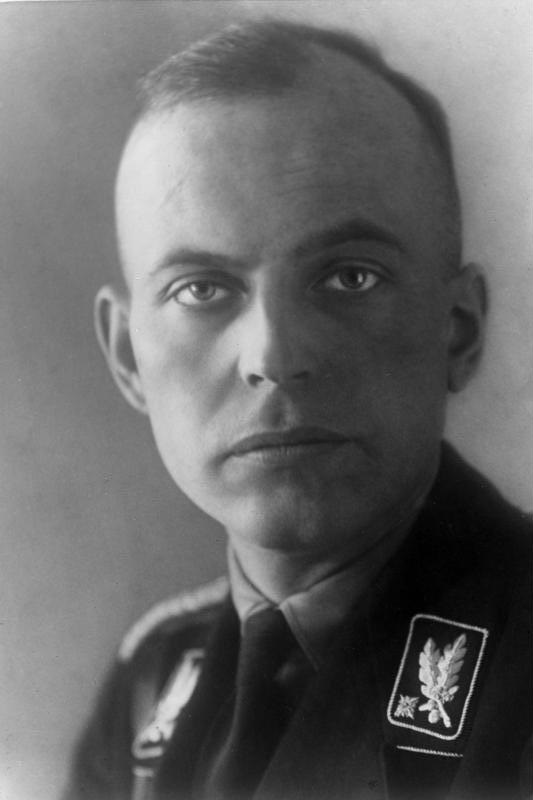
Hans-Adolf Prützmann, who served as one of the early commanders of the 18th SS-Standarte

The 18th SS-Standarte was a regimental formation of the Allgemeine-SS located in the city of Königsberg. The Standarte was one of the earlier General-SS formations and had been founded in 1932, a year before Adolf Hitler and the Nazi Party came to power in Germany.

Throughout the 1930s, the 18th Standarte performed mustering drills of General-SS members and also participated in Nazi functions and parades in and around Königsberg. During this time period, the Standarte was given the honorary regimental title of "Ostpreußen". Hans-Adolf Prützmann, who later became involved in the Holocaust while serving as an SS and Police Leader in Latvia, was an early commander of the Standarate.

In 1939, with the outbreak of World War II, the 18th Standarte began losing most of its membership to either the general draft or to transfer into the Waffen-SS. By 1943, the regiment had ceased to exist except on paper, yet had a posted commander until the collapse of Nazi Germany in May 1945.

== See also ==
- Standarte (Nazi Germany)

== Commanders ==
- SS-Sturmhauptführer Heinz Österreich (February 1, 1932 - August 31, 1932)
- SS-Standartenführer Hans-Adolf Prützmann (August 31, 1932 - December 12, 1933)
  - SS-Sturmbannführer Wilhelm Ihle [Acting Deputy] (April 20, 1933 - December 31, 1933)
- SS-Sturmbannführer Kurt Benson (December 16, 1933 - May 7, 1934)
- SS-Sturmbannführer Karl Schäfer (May 7, 1934 - April 1, 1936)
- SS-Oberführer Heinz Roch (April 1, 1936 - March 1, 1937)
- SS-Standartenführer Johannes Schäfer (March 1, 1937 - March 31, 1938)
- SS-Obersturmbannführer Friedrich Schlums (April 1, 1938 - May 20, 1939)
- SS-Sturmbannführer Erich Raake (May 20, 1939 - May 8, 1945)
