= 17th SS-Standarte =

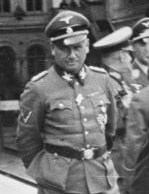
Friedrich Jeckeln served as the first commander of the 17th SS-Standarte.

The 17th SS-Standarte was a regimental formation of the Allgemeine-SS first founded in 1931. The unit was one of the early SS formations in Germany, and was first headquartered in the city of Harburg-Wilhelmsburg.

The original commander of the 17th Standarte, who supervised the regiment's formation, was Friedrich Jeckeln who would later become infamous as an SS and Police Leader in Eastern Russia during World War II. Jeckeln assumed command of the Standarte as a Sturmbannführer when the unit was only at battalion level strength. It was not until after the Nazi Party came to power in Germany, in 1933, that the Standarte had enough of a membership to be considered as a regimental command. Even so, the command was never led by a full Standartenführer, with all of the later commanders holding the rank of Obersturmbannführer.

In April 1936, the 17th Standarte shifted its headquarters to the city of Celle. Three years later, when World War II began, the Standarte began losing its members to either the general draft or to service in the Waffen-SS (General-SS units were considered "part time" and their members were not draft exempt).

By 1942, the 17th Standarte had ceased to actively function but was listed with a posted commander until the fall of Nazi Germany in May 1945.

== Commanders ==
- SS-Sturmbannführer Friedrich Jeckeln (March 31, 1931 – June 22, 1931)
- SS-Sturmhauptführer Klaus Sieh (June 23, 1931 – October 1, 1932)
- SS-Sturmhauptführer Wilhelm Koppe (October 2, 1932 – December 1, 1933)
- SS-Obersturmbannführer Willy Tensfeld (December 1, 1933 – March 16, 1935)
- SS-Obersturmbannführer Friedrich Graf von Pfeil-Burghauss (March 15, 1935 – October 1, 1935)
- SS-Obersturmbannführer Johann von Feil (October 1, 1935 – March 20, 1938)
- SS-Obersturmbannführer Johann Schlechl (March 20, 1938 – May 8, 1945)

== See also ==
- Standarte (Nazi Germany)
