= 6th SS-Standarte =

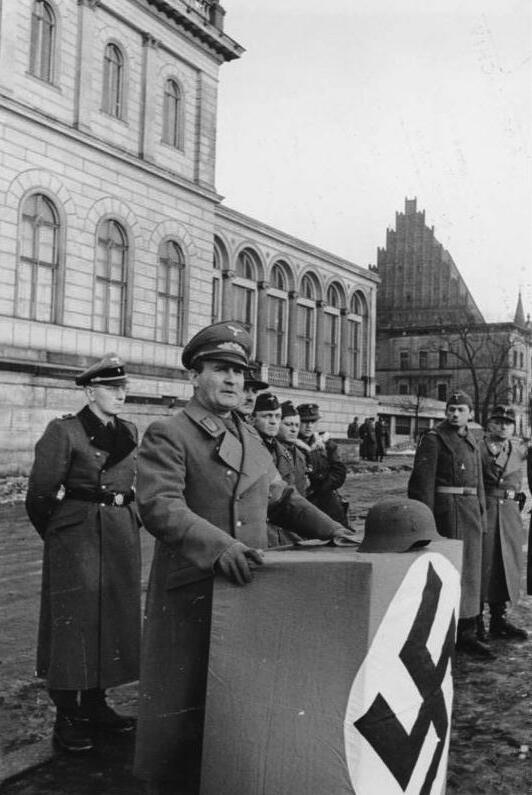
Karl Hanke wearing the Nazi uniform of a Gauleiter. Hanke was an early member of the 6th SS-Standarte and would become the Reichsführer-SS in 1945.

The 6th SS-Standarte was a regimental command of the Allgemeine-SS situated in the city of Berlin. As the command was located in the capital of Germany, the 6th Standarte was considered one of the more important SS units in Nazi Germany. The members of the Standarte themselves, however, were non-paid mustering troops of the "General-SS" as was the practice for most Allgemeine-SS regiments.

The Standarte was first formed in October 1931 and was part of the so-called "Northern SS" under the control of Kurt Daluege. At the time, there was a divisional disunity in the SS, with SS units in southern Germany controlled by Heinrich Himmler and the northern units answering to Daluege. It was not until 1934, after most of the SS headquarters offices had relocated to Berlin, that this division was eventually done away with.

During Reichstag elections of 1931, the 6th SS Standarte played a significant role in campaigning for the Nazi Party and repeated the effort again when Adolf Hitler ran for the office of President of Germany in 1932. One early member of the Standarte, who would later become the Reichsführer-SS was Karl Hanke.

After Hitler became Chancellor of Germany in 1933, the 6th SS-Standarte adopted the honor title of "Charlottenburg" and often participated in several major Nazi Party rallies held in the German capitol. A year later, during the Night of the Long Knives, the Standarte played a major role in rounding up the Sturmabteilung leadership in Berlin, although most SA executions were carried out by SD troops and Gestapo agents.

One of the most notorious actions that the 6th SS-Standarte engaged in was "Kristallnacht" where Berlin SS men sought out and destroyed numerous Jewish synagogues and businesses. Shortly afterwards, the Standarte was granted a second honor title as "6 SS-Standarte Eduard Felsen".

When World War II began in 1939, the Berlin SS regiment slowly began losing its members to regular military service, since mustering Allgemeine-SS personnel were not exempt from conscription. The Standarte was still participating in ceremonial functions as late as 1944, however, and in the last year of the war many of the remaining members became involved with the Volksturm and participated in the Battle of Berlin.

== Commanders ==
- SS-Sturmbannführer Max Henze (October 18, 1931 – July 22, 1932)
- Vacant Command (Deputy Leader only) (July 22, 1932 – August 24, 1932)
- SS-Standartenführer Otto Brass (August 24, 1932 – 16 Nov 1933)
- SS-Standartenführer Wilhelm Reck (November 16, 1933 – January 1, 1935)
- SS-Hauptsturmführer Richard Peter (January 1, 1935 – June 1, 1936)
- SS-Obersturmbannführer Hermann Peter (June 1, 1936 – September 20, 1937)
- SS-Obersturmbannführer Bruno Hofbauer (September 20, 1937 – May 16, 1938)
- SS-Standartenführer Viktor Knapp (May 16, 1938 – May 8, 1945)

== See also ==
- Standarte (Nazi Germany)
