= Max Henze =

SS-Brigadeführer and Police President

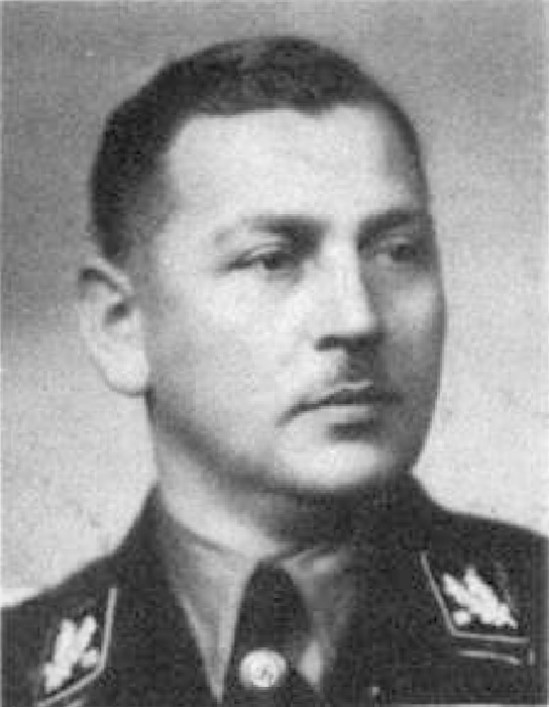
- Max Henze in c. 1938
- Born: 23 September 1899; Köthen, Duchy of Anhalt, German Empire
- Died: 10 March 1951 (aged 51); Bydgoszcz, Poland
- Military career
- Allegiance: German Empire; Nazi Germany
- Branch: Imperial German Army; Schutzstaffel
- Service years: 1917–1918; 1927–1945
- Rank: SS-Brigadeführer
- Commands: Police President Kassel; Bromberg; Danzig; Essen
- Conflicts: World War I World War II
- Awards: Iron Cross, 2nd class War Merit Cross, 2nd class with Swords; Wound Badge, in black

Max Henze (23 September 1899 – 10 March 1951) was a German Nazi politician and SS-Brigadeführer who was police chief in Kassel, Bromberg (today Bydgoszcz), Danzig (today Gdańsk) and Essen. At the end of the Second World War, he was executed in Poland for war crimes and crimes against humanity.

== Early life ==
Henze was born in Köthen and attended elementary school there and in Berlin. Upon completing school, he volunteered for military service with the Imperial German Army in 1917. He served in the First World War with a machine gun company in Reserve Infantry Regiment 24 and Infantry Regiment 396. Gassed and wounded twice, he earned the Iron Cross, second class and the Wound Badge in black. At the end of the war, he was discharged. In the early months of 1919, he spent several months serving as a rifleman with the Cuxhaven coastal defense battery. He completed an apprenticeship in business and worked from October 1919 to 1932 as a commercial clerk. From February 1923 to spring 1926, he belonged to the Freikorps Roßbach, a paramilitary militia.

== Peacetime SS, police and political career ==
Henze joined the Nazi Party (Party membership number 80,481) on 1 April 1928. As an early Party member, he would later be awarded the Golden Party Badge. He became a member of the SS (SS number 1,167) on 7 June 1927. Commissioned an SS-Untersturmführer on 14 October 1929, he advanced up the ranks, commanding company and battalion size units for the next two years. From 18 October 1931 to 22 July 1932, he served as the first commander of the 6th SS-Standarte, headquartered in Berlin. On 7 August 1932, he succeeded SS-Gruppenführer Kurt Daluege as the commander of SS-Abschnitt (District) III, also based in Berlin and overseeing six SS-Standarten. In 1933 he was in charge of the newly opened prison called Columbia-Haus in the Tempelhof area of the city where hundreds of the regime's opponents were imprisoned. He was transferred on 20 February 1934 to the leadership of SS-Abschnitt XV in Altona where he remained until 25 August 1934. He next was appointed as a special assignment officer in the office of Reichsführer-SS Heinrich Himmler. This was followed in March 1935 by a posting as a special duties officer in SS-Oberabschnitt (Main District) "Ost" in Berlin until April 1936. In January 1937, when SS-Oberabschnitt "Fulda-Werra" was established in Hesse, he obtained a staff position at the headquarters in Arolsen, remaining until November 1938 when he was posted to SS-Gruppenführer Reinhard Heydrich's Sicherheitsdienst Hauptamt (SD Main Office), an office that would later become part of the infamous Reich Security Main Office.

Also in January 1937, Henze was appointed Acting Police President of Kassel in northern Hesse, a position that was made permanent in October. Thus, he was the leader of security forces in the city when the Kassel Synagogue was attacked and its contents burned on 7 November 1938, in one of the first events of the anti-Jewish pogrom known as Kristallnacht. In addition to the synagogue, around twenty Jewish-owned shops were looted and destroyed. Reportedly, the police "stood by, looked on and did nothing. An eyewitness remembered seeing the police commissioner of Kassel observing the violence passively."

Also active in politics, Henze was elected as a member of the Prussian Landtag on 24 April 1932 and served until its abolition in January 1934. On 12 November 1933, he was elected as a deputy to the Reichstag from electoral constituency 2 (Berlin), serving until the fall of the Nazi regime. On 17 May 1935, he became a City Councillor for the district of Berlin-Weißensee.

== Second World War ==
After the German invasion of Poland at the beginning of the Second World War in September 1939, Henze left his police leadership post in Kassel and was temporarily made police chief of Bromberg, which had been annexed from Poland. He was involved at this point in the rounding up and summary executions of the Polish intelligentsia and clergy. This was followed by appointment as Police President of Danzig on 1 April 1940. In October 1941 he left Danzig when he was made Acting Police President of Essen, becoming permanent in July 1942. He was given the title of Generalmajor der polizei in 1944 and remained in the Essen post throughout the remainder of the war years.

After his capture in 1945, Henze was interned by the British in Recklinghausen and Hamburg. He was then extradited to Poland in 1947. He stood trial from 8 October to 4 November 1949 for crimes committed during his tenure as Chief of Police in Bromberg and Danzig, together with SS-Obergruppenführer Richard Hildebrandt who had been the Higher SS and Police Leader in Danzig. At the conclusion of the trial, Henze and Hildebrandt both were sentenced to death by the Bydgoszcz court, and the sentences were upheld by the Polish Supreme Court in Warsaw on 25 November 1950. The Polish President Bolesław Bierut denied a request for clemency and confirmed the sentences on 3 December. Hildebrandt and Henze were both hanged in the Bydgoszcz prison on 10 March 1951.

== SS ranks ==
SS ranks
Rank	Date
14 October 1929	SS-Untersturmführer
1 February 1931	SS-Sturmbannführer
18 October 1931	SS-Standartenführer
22 July 1932	SS-Oberführer
15 December 1933	SS-Brigadeführer

== See also ==
- Intelligenzaktion Pommern

== Sources ==
- Klee, Ernst (2007). Das Personenlexikon zum Dritten Reich. Wer war was vor und nach 1945. Frankfurt-am-Main: Fischer-Taschenbuch-Verlag. ISBN 978-3-596-16048-8.
- Miller, Michael D.; Schulz, Andreas (2015). Leaders of the SS & German Police. Vol. 2 Reichsführer SS – Gruppenführer (Hans Haltermann to Walter Kruger). R. James Bender Publishing. ISBN 978-1-932-97025-8.
- Schiffer Publishing Ltd., ed. (2000). SS Officers List: SS-Standartenführer to SS-Oberstgruppenführer (As of 30 January 1942). Schiffer Military History Publishing. ISBN 0-7643-1061-5.
- Steinweis, Alan E. (2009). Kristallnacht 1938. Harvard University Press. ISBN 978-0-674-03623-9.
- Williams, Max (2015). SS Elite: The Senior Leaders of Hitler's Praetorian Guard, Vol. 1 (A-J). Fonthill Media LLC. ISBN 978-1-78155-433-3.
- Yerger, Mark C. (1997). Allgemeine-SS: The Commands, Units and Leaders of the General SS. Schiffer Publishing Ltd. ISBN 0-7643-0145-4.
