= Wilhelm Brandt =

German military officer and engineer (1900–1941)

- Born: May 22, 1900; Wesel, Germany
- Died: July 15, 1941 (aged 41); Gorki Tushkeva
- Burial place: Shchatkava cemetery 53°12′49″N 29°10′16″E
- Spouse: Adele Brandt
- Military career
- Allegiance: Nazi Germany
- Branch: Waffen-SS
- Service years: 1936–1941
- Rank: SS-Obersturmbannführer
- Nickname: Wim
- Service number: SS-Nr. 171.670
- Unit: SS-Division "Reich"
- Commands: SS Regiment 11
- Conflicts: Chaco War; World War II
- Awards: SS-Totenkopfring, Iron Cross (1914), 2nd class

Wilhelm "Wim" Reni Brandt was a German military officer and engineer known for his writings and developments in the fields of camouflage and tank warfare, being friends with Ernst Volckmann. Among other developments, Brandt was responsible for a type of camouflage clothing and helmet covers issued to the Waffen SS. Brandt also wrote a number of works on armored warfare theory, beginning in 1924. In the early 1930s, Brandt participated in the Chaco War between Bolivia and Paraguay, assisting the Bolivian side and their small armoured forces.

He was severely wounded on the Eastern Front on 13 July 1941 and died two days later in a military field hospital.

== Commands ==
- Company Commander in the SS-Standarte 'Deutschland'
- Leader of the SS-Panzer-Abwehr-Sturmbann der SS-VT
- Commander of the SS-Kradschützen-Sturmbann 'Verfügungstruppe'
- Commander of the SS-Aufklärungs-Abteilung 'Verfügungstruppe'
- Commander of the SS-Totenkopf-Standarte 11 of the SS-Division 'Deutschland'.
- Commander of the SS-Regiment 11 of the SS-Division (mot.)'Reich'.

== SS-Promotions ==
- 1 March 1936: SS-Hauptsturmführer
- 1 June 1939: SS-Sturmbannführer
- 1 July 1940: SS-Obersturmbannführer
