= Canon de 76 FRC =

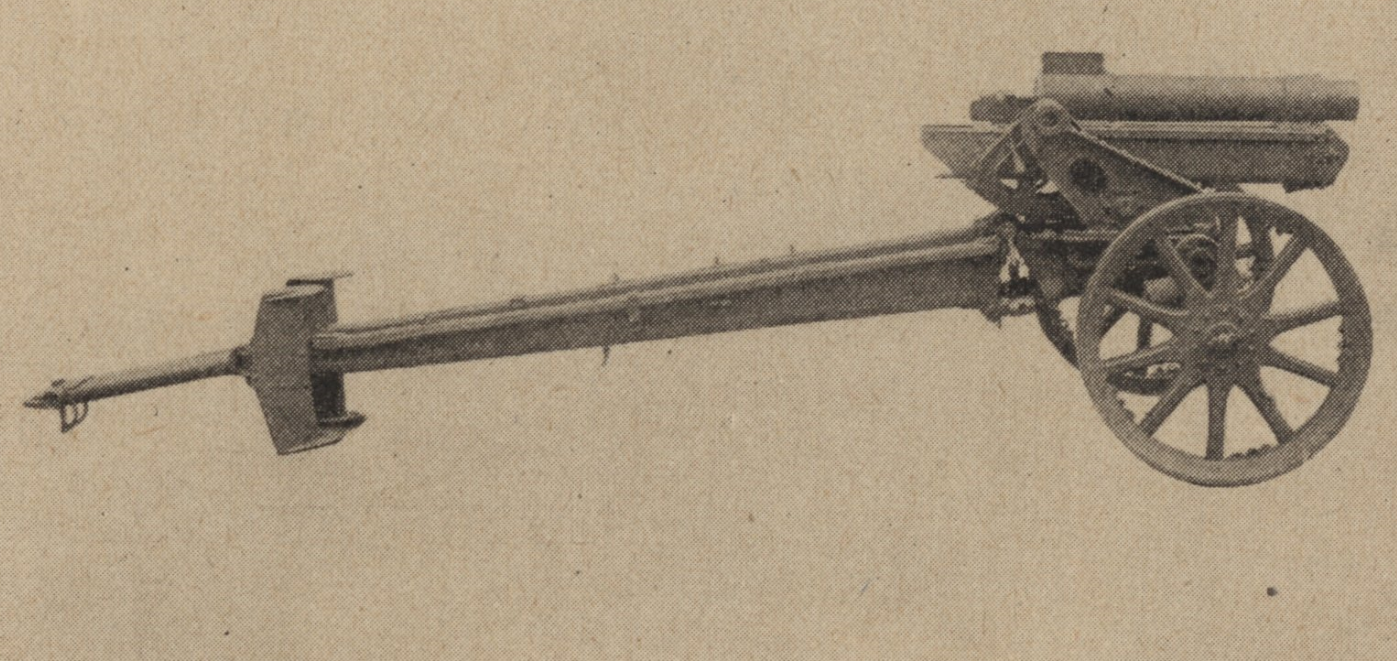
- Place of origin: Belgium

Service history
- Used by: Belgium; Nazi Germany
- Wars: World War II

Production history
- Manufacturer: Fonderie Royale des Canons
- No. built: 198

Specifications
- Mass: travel: 275 kg (606 lbs) combat: 243 kg (536 lbs)
- Barrel length: 0.59 m (1 ft 11 in) L/7.8
- Crew: 5
- Shell: 4.64 kg (10.22 lbs)
- Caliber: 76 millimetres (3.0 in)
- Recoil: Hydro-spring
- Carriage: Split-trail
- Elevation: -6° to +80°
- Traverse: 40°
- Rate of fire: 18 rpm
- Muzzle velocity: 160 m/s (525 ft/s)
- Effective firing range: 2,200 m (2,406 yds)

The Canon de 76 FRC was a Belgian infantry support gun, produced by the Fonderie Royale des Canons (FRC). The gun was typically of 76 mm calibre; however, an optional 47 mm barrel could be fitted instead. The gun was designed for transport via a trailer towed by a vehicle. In 1940, the Wehrmacht redesignated these as 7.6 cm IG 260(b). At the start of World War II, 198 of these guns had been produced.

== See also ==
- 47 mm Model 1931 anti-tank gun
