= 47 mm Model 1931 anti-tank gun =

47 mm Model 1931 anti-tank gun C.47 F.R.C. Mod.31
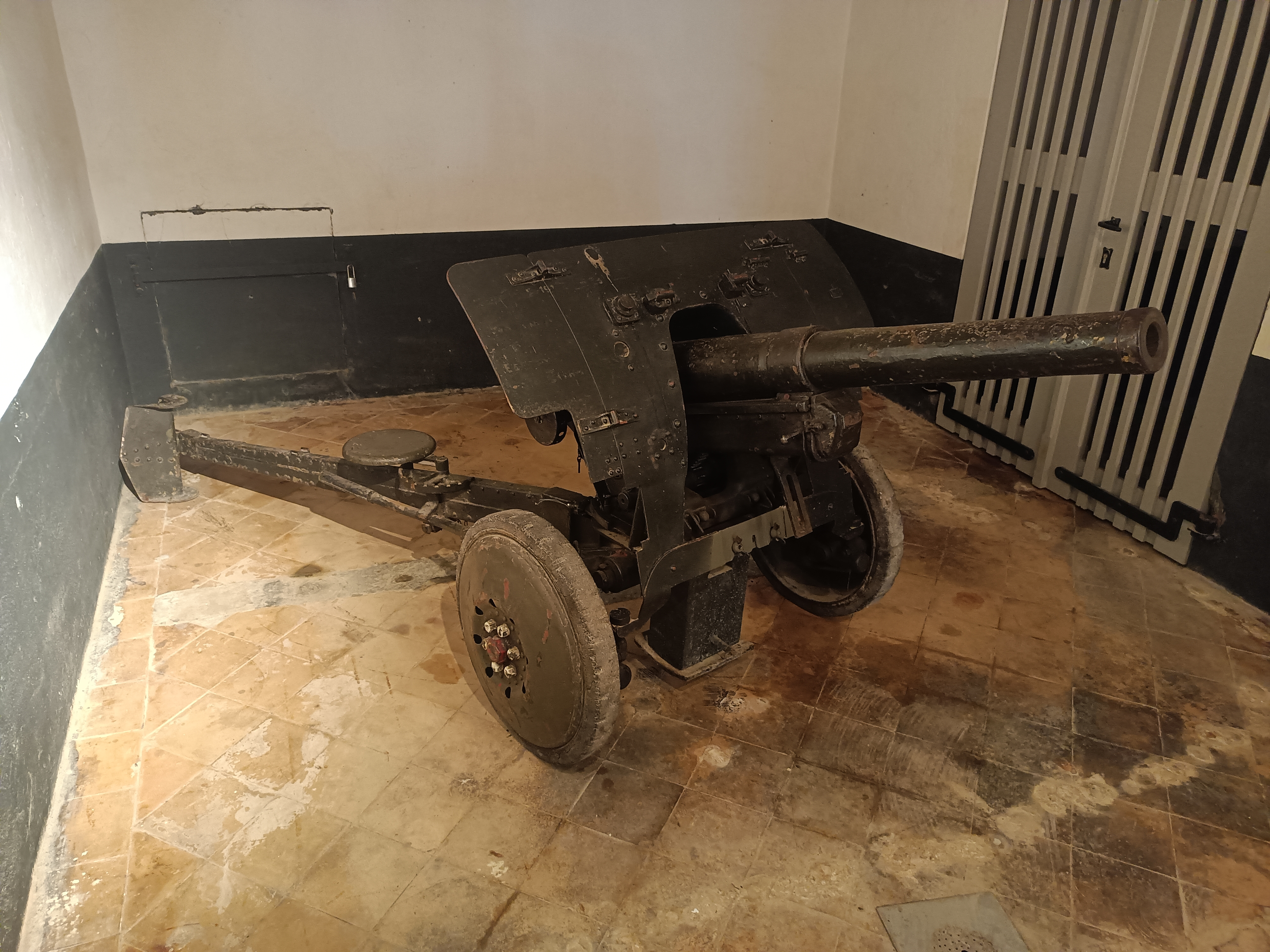
- An example from the collection of Fort Liezele.
- Type: Anti-tank gun
- Place of origin: Belgium

Service history
- In service: Second World War
- Used by: Belgium; Nazi Germany; Kingdom of Hungary

Production history
- Designed: 1931
- Manufacturer: Fonderie Royale de Canons
- No. built: 750+

Specifications
- Mass: 515 kg (1,135 lb)
- Barrel length: 1.6 m (5 ft 3 in) L/33.6
- Shell: Fixed QF 47 x 280mm R
- Shell weight: 1.5 kg (3 lb 5 oz)
- Caliber: 47 mm (1.9 in)
- Carriage: Split-trail
- Elevation: -3° to +20°
- Traverse: 40° (Towed variant)
- Muzzle velocity: 720 m/s (2,400 ft/s) (AP); 450 m/s (1,500 ft/s) (HE)
- Effective firing range: 1 km (3,300 ft)
- Maximum firing range: 2 km (6,600 ft)

The Royal Cannon Foundry 47mm anti-tank gun Model 1931 (French: Canon anti-char de 47mm Fonderie Royale de Canons Modèle 1931, abbreviated to C.47 F.R.C. Mod.31) was an artillery piece developed in 1931 for the Belgian Army which saw widespread service in the Battle of Belgium in 1940. It was colloquially known as the "'Quat'sept," nicknamed after its 47 millimetres (1.9 in) caliber by the Belgian soldiers that used it.

It was developed by the firm F.R.C., the Herstal-based Fonderie Royale de Canons, not to be confused with the French F.R.C.

== Versions ==
There were two versions of the 47mm gun, each developed for a different situation: the Infantry version and the Light Troops version. The Infantry Version was furnished with heavier but more durable full-rubber tires. In contrast, the Light Troops version was equipped with pneumatic tires for greater road mobility. Both versions were capable of being incorporated into fixed defenses and bunkers for stationary purposes. One such example of this was in Belgium at the fortifications of the Albert Canal. They were also attached to Belgian combat vehicles of WWII as support weapons, such as the T-13 tank destroyer and the 'Canon antichar automoteur Vickers-Carden-Loyd Mk.VI'.

== Performance ==
The 47mm anti-tank gun had an impressive performance compared to contemporary WW2 German or French designs – respectively the 3.7 cm Pak 36 and 25mm Hotchkiss anti-tank gun. In medium-range armor penetration, the Belgian model even outperformed the British Ordnance QF 2-pounder. For instance, armor-piercing rounds could penetrate 47 millimetres (1.9 in) of armored steel at a range of 300 metres (980 ft). This type of damage was largely attributed to the heavy caliber design with a shell weight of 1.52 kilograms (3.4 lb) for the armor-piercing rounds.

However, this performance came at a price. With a total weight of 515 kilograms (1,135 lb) (not including ammunition or other equipment) the 47mm was much heavier than the German Pak 36 at 327 kilograms (721 lb), 37 mm gun M3 at 912 lb (414 kg) or 37 mm Bofors at 370 kg (820 lb), although the Soviet 45-mm was about the same at 560 kg (1,230 lb) while the 2-pdr was significantly heavier at 1,795 lb (814 kg). Despite its substantial mass, the 47mm was easier to conceal due to its relatively compact design. Repositioning of the Belgian anti-tank gun was aided by the Vickers Utility B armored tractors in the infantry divisions, the Alvis Hefty 4wd heavy car in the Chasseur Ardennais or the Ford Marmon Herrington armored tractors in the cavalry units.

== Service history ==
=== Belgium ===
Over 750 47mm guns were in service in the Belgian army at the time of the German invasion in 1940. All active and first reserve infantry units, cavalry units, and units of the border guards were equipped with the gun, while the second reserve units had to make do with older anti-tank rifles. Every infantry regiment consisted of 3 battalions of rifle infantry and a single heavy arms battalion. This in turn consisted of three heavy weapon companies, one of which was equipped with 12 47mm guns. Given its good armor-penetrating capabilities, the 47mm could penetrate the armor of the German Panzer III and Panzer IV tanks from a range of over 500 metres (1,600 ft).

=== Germany ===
Several hundred 47mm guns were captured by the Germans after the battle of Belgium. The German designation for these captured guns was the 4.7 cm Pak 185(b). A few were installed in Atlantic Wall defenses in Belgium and the Channel Islands.

=== Hungary ===
Several of the 47mm guns captured by Germany were donated to Hungary in 1940-1. This donation was to make up for Hungary's lack of anti-tank guns during Operation Barbarossa. However, their use by the Hungarians was limited due to a lack of spare parts. Furthermore, the armor-penetrating capabilities of the guns had also been surpassed by Soviet advances in tank construction. Most of the captured guns were relegated to training duties instead.

== See also ==
- 47mm APX anti-tank gun - a comparable French gun of the same period
- 47 mm Bohler anti-tank gun - a comparable Austrian and Italian gun
- Canon de 76 FRC
