= First SS-Abschnitt =

- SS-Abschnitt I
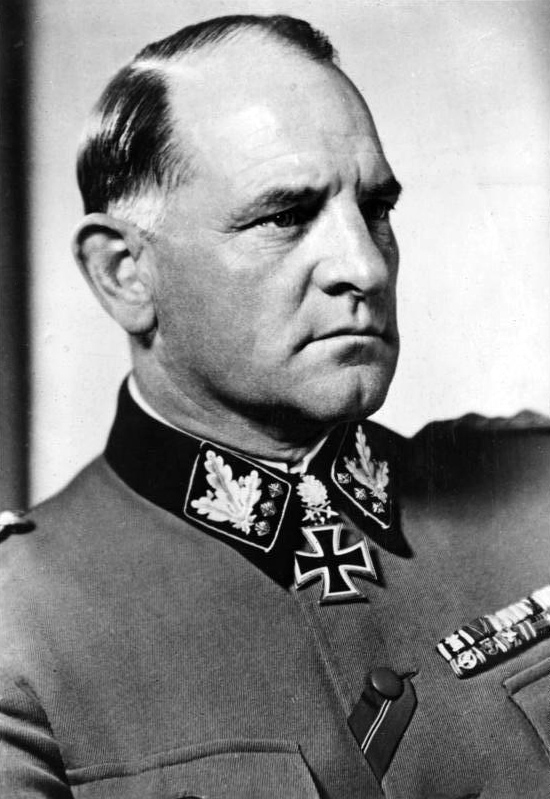
- Josef Dietrich, who served as the original commander of the 1st SS-Abschnitt
- Active: 1929–1945
- Country: Germany
- Branch: Allgemeine-SS
- Type: Brigade formation

The First SS-Abschnitt (lit. 'First SS-Section') was a brigade formation of the Allgemeine-SS and the first such unit ever established in the SS. The First Abschnitt was originally known as the SS-Brigaden 1 and was founded due to an expansion of the SS between 1929 and 1930, causing the need for SS-regiments (known as Standarten) to be grouped into higher brigade sized formations. The SS-Brigades were modeled after the same type of unit used by the Sturmabteilung.

The 1st SS-Brigade was headquartered in Munich, and its original leadership staff consisted of former members of the 1st SS-Standarte, of which the 1st Brigade acted as the commanding formation; the first appointed brigade commander was Josef Dietrich. Dietrich was technically the commander of the Abschnitt until 1932, although after a few short months, Dietrich began to become more and more involved in Hitler's personal protection corps (later to become the nucleus of the Leibstandarte-SS) and left the day-to-day running of the 1st Brigade to subordinates. During these years, Dietrich was also listed as the commander of the SS-Group South, which was the superior command to the 1st SS-Brigade.

By 1933, the name of the command had been changed to SS-Abschnitt I, or the 1st SS-District. As the Nazi Party came to power and Adolf Hitler went to Berlin along with Dietrich's Leibstandarte, the association of the Abschnitt's role with Hitler's presence in Munich gradually diminished and the command became more involved with ceremonial functions surrounding the Munich Brown House.

Through the 1930s, the Abschnitt was seen as one of the more important units within the SS as Munich was still viewed as a highly important city due to Munich's status as the birthplace of the Nazi Party. The Abschnitt continued to operate in full force until the start of World War II when many of the Abschnitt staff were either conscripted into the Wehrmacht or joined the Waffen-SS.

By 1943, the daily operations of the Abschnitt had been overshadowed by the Office of the SS and Police Leader although the First Abschnitt continued to be listed as an active command until the end of the war. The Abschnitt was disbanded in May 1945, upon the collapse of Nazi Germany.

== Chain of Command ==
- Superior Command: SS-Oberabschnitt Süd
- Subordinate Commands: 1st SS-Standarte, 31st SS-Standarte, 34th SS-Standarte

== Commanders ==
- SS-Gruppenführer Josef Dietrich (July 11, 1930 – August 11, 1932)
- SS-Oberführer Johann-Erasmus Freiherr von Malsen-Ponickau (August 11, 1932 – May 2, 1933)
- SS-Standartenführer Wilhelm Starck (May 2, 1933 – April 17, 1934)
- SS-Oberführer Heinz Roch (April 17, 1934 – March 15, 1936)
- SS-Brigadeführer Christoph Diehm (March 15, 1936 – March 1, 1939)
- SS-Oberführer Hans Döring (March 1, 1939 – October 1, 1942)
- Post Vacant (Deputy Commanders Only) (October 1, 1942 – April 1, 1943)
- SS-Brigadeführer Franz Jaegy (April 1, 1943 – May 8, 1945)
