= Yujra =

Yujra is a surname of Bolivian origin. Notable people with the surname include:

- Martha Yujra (born 1964), Bolivian politician
- Omar Yujra (born 1980), Bolivian politician
- Policarpio Castañeta Yujra (born 1957), Bolivian politician

== See also ==
- Yuja
