= 1st SS-Standarte =

Regimental command of the Allgemine-SS

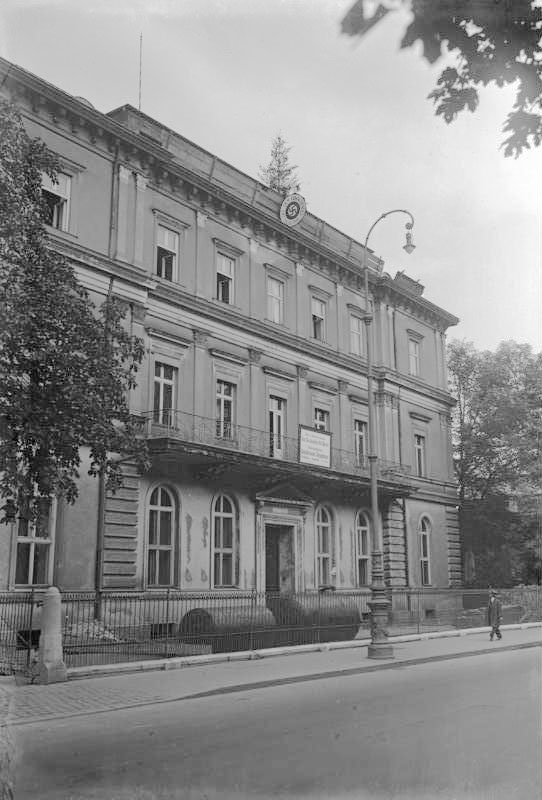
Nazi Party headquarters in Munich, which opened in 1931 when the Party leadership moved into the building. The "Brown House" also served as the HQ of the 1st SS Standarte.

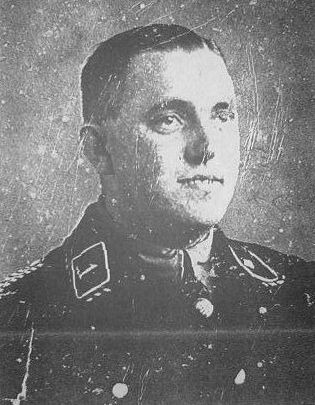
Anton Dunckern wearing a "1" of the 1st Standarte

The 1st SS-Standarte was a regimental command of the Allgemeine-SS and one of the units in the General-SS order of battle.

== History ==
The unit was formed on 1 August 1928. It was reorganized from previous Schutzstaffel (SS) units, known as SS-Gaus. Based in Munich, the 1st SS Standarte was charged with protection of top Nazi Party leaders, including Adolf Hitler. Its first commander was Josef "Sepp" Dietrich. For most of its existence, the command was known by the honor title "Julius Schreck". Schreck had been the co-commander of the first Stabswache bodyguard unit for Hitler in 1923 and later the first leader of the SS.

By 1929, Hitler had re-formed a personal bodyguard unit known as the Stabswache, which would eventually become the nucleus of the future 1st SS Division Leibstandarte SS Adolf Hitler. At this stage, the Stabswache and the 1st SS Standarte were practically one and the same. By 1930, however, Dietrich began to be seen strictly as the commander of the Stabswache, with the day-to-day running of the 1st Standarte handled by then SS-Standartenführer Heinrich Höflich.

When Hitler became Chancellor of Germany in 1933, Dietrich traveled with the Führer to Berlin to set up a new SS-Guard for the German leader. It was mostly made up of men from the 1st SS-Standarte. The unit replaced the army guards assigned to protect the Chancellor of Germany. Dietrich went on to command the new unit known as the "SS-Stabswache Berlin". Later it became known as the SS-Sonderkommando Berlin. In November 1933, the Sonderkommando received the title Leibstandarte Adolf Hitler (LAH). Finally, Himmler modified that title to Leibstandarte-SS Adolf Hitler (LSSAH) on 13 April 1934.

In the summer of 1933, leadership of what remained of 1st Standarte in Munich was taken over by SS-Standartenführer Emil Wäckerle. By the Night of the Long Knives in 1934, the SS had solidified itself with new headquarters in Berlin. The 1st SS Standarte lost most of its operational importance and became a unit attached to the Munich Nazi Party headquarters, known as the "Brown House" for which the SS was in charge of security.

The next commander of the 1st SS Standarte, after the Night of the Long Knives, was Julian Scherner, later known as the SS and Police Leader of Krakau, who was depicted in the Steven Spielberg film Schindler's List. After Scherner's tour as the Standarte commander, leadership passed through two more leaders, until eventually command was assumed by SS-Standartenführer Erich Buchmann, who held the command until his transfer to 2.SS-Sturmbrigade Dirlewanger in October 1944 with the demoted rank of SS-Obersturmbannführer, where he commanded one of the regiments within the Brigade until the end of war.

== Order of battle ==
- SS-Oberabschnitt Süd (SS Division South)
- First SS-Abschnitt (1st SS District)
- 1st-SS Standarte (1st SS Regiment)

== Commanders ==
- SS-Sturmführer Josef Dietrich (August 1, 1928 – September 18, 1929)
- SS-Oberführer Heinrich Höflich (September 18, 1929 – February 10, 1933)
- SS-Standartenführer Emil Wäckerle (February 10, 1933 – November 9, 1933)
- SS-Standartenführer Johann Maier (November 9, 1933 – January 1, 1934)
- SS-Obersturmführer Julian Scherner (January 1, 1934 – January 9, 1935)
- SS-Sturmbannführer Hans Butchner (January 9, 1935 – November 9, 1936)
- SS-Obersturmbannführer Willibald Fleichmann (November 9, 1936 – October 1, 1937)
- SS-Standartenführer Erich Buchmann (October 1, 1937 – December 1, 1944)

== See also ==
- Standarte (Nazi Germany)
