= Hans-Adolf Prützmann =

German SS officer (1901–1945)

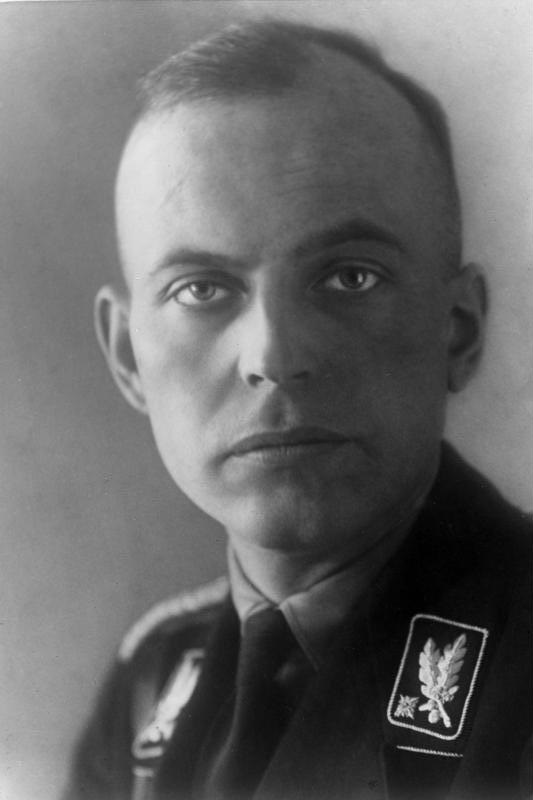
- Prützmann in 1934
- Born: 31 August 1901; Tolkemit, East Prussia, Kingdom of Prussia, German Empire
- Died: 16 May 1945 (aged 43); Lüneburg, British occupation zone in Germany
- Cause of death: Suicide
- Military career
- Allegiance: Nazi Germany
- Branch: Schutzstaffel: Allgemeine-SS; Waffen-SS
- Service years: 1930–1945
- Rank: SS-Obergruppenführer und General der Waffen-SS und Polizei
- Commands: Higher SS and Police Leader, "Baltic States and Northern Russia"; "Southern Russia"; Supreme SS and Police Leader, "Ukraine"
- Conflicts: World War II
- Awards: German Cross in Gold; Iron Cross, 1st and 2nd class War Merit Cross, 1st and 2nd class with Swords

Hans-Adolf Prützmann (31 August 1901 – 16 May 1945) was among the highest-ranking German SS officials during the Nazi era. From June 1941 to September 1944, he served as a Higher SS and Police Leader in the occupied Soviet Union, and from November 1943 was the Supreme SS and Police Leader in Ukraine. He oversaw the activities of the Einsatzgruppen detachments that perpetrated the Holocaust in the Baltic states and Ukraine. After being captured at the end of World War II, he committed suicide.

== Early life ==
Prützmann was born in the East Prussian town of Tolkemit, the son of a businessman. After completing his secondary education at the gymnasium, Prützmann became a member of the Freikorps "Aulock" between 1918 and 1921, seeing active service in the Upper Silesian uprisings in the summer of 1921. Afterwards, he studied agriculture at the University of Göttingen from 1921 to 1923 and then worked for seven years as an agricultural official in the Prussian provinces of Pomerania, Brandenburg, and East Prussia.

== Peacetime SS career ==
Prützmann joined the Nazi Party on 1 August 1929 (membership number 142,290) and was a holder of the Golden Party Badge. He entered the Sturmabteilung (SA) shortly afterward, but he left the SA and transferred to the Schutzstaffel in Bochum on 12 August 1930 (SS number 3,002).

By August 1931 he was promoted to SS-Standartenführer and became the first commander (Führer) of the 19th SS-Standarte "Westfalen-Nord," based in Gelsenkirchen. At this point in time, Prützmann's career began a steep rise. In April 1932, he was elected to the Landtag of Prussia. In July of that year he was elected to the Reichstag for electoral constituency 17, Westphalia North. He would continue to serve in the Reichstag until the end of the Nazi regime, and he would successively be elected for East Prussia (March 1933), Württemberg (March 1936) and Hamburg (April 1938), as his SS postings changed.

In September 1932, Prützmann transferred from Westphalia to take command of the 18th SS-Standarte "Ostpreussen", based in Königsberg (now Kaliningrad). This was followed by a stint as commander of SS-Abschnitt (District) X based in Stuttgart from July to November 1933. He was promoted to SS-Brigadeführer in November 1933, and appointed the first commander of the newly-formed SS-Oberabschnitt (Main District) "Südwest," also based in Stuttgart. In February 1934, he was promoted to the rank of SS-Gruppenführer.

From 1 March 1937 through 30 April 1941, Prützmann led SS-Oberabschnitt "Nordwest" (renamed "Nordsee" 20 April 1940) whose headquarters were in Hamburg. In June 1937, he joined the State government as a Staatsrat (State Councillor) and member of the Hamburg Senate. At the end of March 1938, he was named chief of police administration for Hamburg, Germany's second largest city. When the post of Höherer SS- und Polizeiführer (HSSPF), (Higher SS and Police Leader) "Nordwest" (renamed "Nordsee" 20 April 1940) was created on 28 June 1938, Prützmann became the first holder of this position. As HSSPF, he reported directly to Reichsführer-SS Heinrich Himmler. From Hamburg, Prützmann was transferred on 30 April 1941 to become the HSSPF "Nordost" and commander of the Oberabschnitt "Nordost," in Königsberg.

== World War II ==
By April 1941, Prützmann had been appointed Generalleutnant (Lieutenant General) of Police. Immediately after the German invasion of the Soviet Union, he took up the position of HSSPF "Ostland und Rußland-Nord" (Baltics and Northern Russia) in Riga on 29 June 1941. In this position, he was responsible for internal security and combating partisans in the Army Group North Rear Area encompassing the Baltic States and western Belorussia. He commanded all SS, SD (Security Service) and Order Police in the region, including Police Regiment North. He retained this position until November 1941 and then was transferred to become HSSPF "Rußland-Süd" (Southern Russia), headquartered in Kiev. At that time he was promoted to SS-Obergruppenführer and General of Police.

In early 1942, Prützmann was put in charge of securing forced labor for the Durchgangsstrasse IV, a large project to build a road from Lemberg (now Lviv) to Stalino (now Donetsk). Workers came from Soviet prisoners of war and Jewish concentration camp inmates. Thousands perished from the harsh conditions and from liquidation of the labor camps when the project was completed.

In August 1942, Himmler made Prützmann responsible for all anti-partisan activities in Ukraine. During the first half of 1943, Prützmann conducted numerous anti-partisan operations, each one resulting in the deaths or capture of many thousands.

The next major advancement in Prützmann's career came on 29 October 1943 when he was named to the new post of Höchster SS- und Polizeiführer (HöSSPF), (Supreme SS and Police Leader) "Ukraine," one of only two officers to attain this designation, the other being SS-Obergruppenführer Karl Wolff in Italy. In this post, Prützmann oversaw his own HSSPF "Rußland-Süd" as well as HSSPF "Schwarzes Meer" (Black Sea). His vast jurisdiction encompassed some sixteen subordinate SS- und Polizeiführer (SSPF) commands, and controlled the largest contingent of Order Police battalions and Schutzmannschaft (Auxiliary Police) battalions in any of the occupied territories.

=== Role in the Holocaust in the Baltics ===
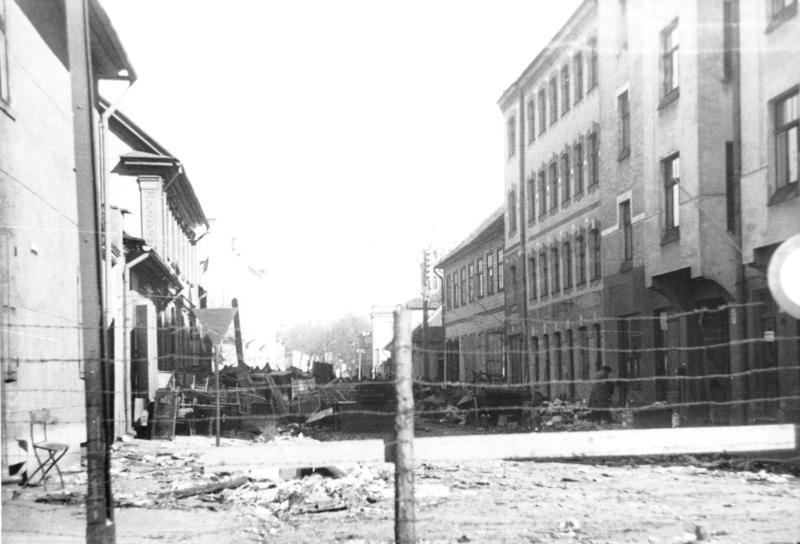
The Riga Ghetto in 1942. Prützmann was responsible for setting up this ghetto. Most of its inhabitants were killed in the Rumbula massacre.

From June to November 1941, Prützmann held the post of HSSPF in the Baltic States under Hinrich Lohse, who was in charge of the Reichskommissariat Ostland. The killing of Jews and other persons began almost immediately, and at first they were primarily conducted by a specialized mobile killing group (Einsatzgruppe A). In late July 1941, Einsatzgruppe A moved out of the Baltics as it followed the German Army Group North further east into the Soviet Union, and primary responsibility for organizing the murder of Jews then moved to the Riga office of the SD. As HSSPF, Prützmann was in charge of the SD, and the person responsible for locally implementing the Final Solution.

After the departure of Einsatzgruppe A, a dispute arose among the Nazi rulers about their so-called "Jewish problem." One group, consisting mainly of civilian Nazi Party administrators headed by Lohse, and backed by Alfred Rosenberg, the Reichsminister for the Occupied Eastern Territories, wanted to confine the Jews to ghettos, confiscate all their property and work them as slave laborers in support of Germany's war effort. Reichsführer-SS Himmler, the overall head of the SS and SD, and Prützmann's direct superior, wanted the Jews exterminated as quickly as possible. Up until November, 1941, the Lohse/Rosenberg faction had prevailed. Although about 30,000 of Latvia's approximately 70,000 Jews and 80,000 of Lithuania's 210,000 had been killed by then, Himmler was unhappy with the pace. He replaced Prützmann in mid-November 1941 with Friedrich Jeckeln, who in Ukraine had developed his own "Jeckeln system" of killing 10,000 or more people in a single day. Prützmann was assigned to Ukraine in Jeckeln's place. By the time Jeckeln took over as HSSPF, massive numbers of Jews had already been killed under Prützmann's administration, including those in the early Liepāja massacres. Also, Prützmann was responsible for rounding up additional masses of Jews and confining them together into ghettos, which allowed them to be more readily killed later by Jeckeln and others.

=== Role in the Holocaust in Ukraine ===
When Prützmann arrived in Ukraine in November 1941, mass murders of Jews and other Ukrainians had already been underway since shortly after the German invasion in June. In fact, some of the most notorious mass executions such as those at Babi Yar (29-30 September) and Nikolaev (16-30 September) had already taken place under the direction of Prützmann's predecessor, Jeckeln. There were two Einsatzgruppen (designated C and D) operating in Ukraine and they continued their gruesome work throughout Prützmann's tenure. Shortly after his arrival, the massacre at Drobytsky Yar on 15 December took place in which over 16,000 were murdered. In Dnepropetrovsk in February 1942, Einsatzgruppe D reduced the city's Jewish population from 30,000 to 702 over the course of four days. In the Lutsk Ghetto on 19–23 August 1942 another 14,700 victims were murdered. At Volodymyr-Volynskyi on 1–3 September an estimated 13,500 were shot.

Prützmann (right) meets with Heinrich Himmler during Himmler's visit to Ukraine, September 1942

Ongoing executions continued to take place throughout the remainder of the Nazi occupation under Prützmann's administration. Though most mass killings were committed by the Einsatzgruppen, as HSSPF, Prützmann commanded the SS, SD, Order Police and Auxiliary Police battalions that also took part in the suppression, persecution and murder of Jews and other Ukrainians, as the following illustrates:

Throughout 1942, Prützmann was heavily implicated in the actions against the Jews and the partisans of the Ukraine ... and Prützmann showed himself to be a willing participant by his ruthless methods ... On 27 October 1942, Himmler directed Prützmann to clear the ghetto at Pinsk, with the intention of making the Ukraine Judenfrei, and by 26 December 1942, Prützmann was able to report to Himmler that 363,211 Jews had been liquidated.

=== Last assignments, capture and suicide ===
In January 1944, Prützmann was placed in command of his own Kampfgruppe (Battle Group) "Prützmann" under the command of Army Group South and was awarded with the German Cross in Gold for his actions. As Red Army advances on the eastern front pushed the German forces out of Ukraine, he moved back to Königsburg where he was still the titular HSSPF, though others had acted on his behalf during his long assignment in the Soviet Union. In June 1944, he was made Himmler's liaison officer to OKW (Armed Forces High Command) and, on 1 July 1944, he was made a General of the Waffen-SS.

One of his last major assignments came in September 1944 when Prützmann was appointed by Himmler as Generalinspekteur für Spezialabwehr (Inspector General for Special Defense) and assigned the task of setting up Operation Werwolf headquarters in Berlin, and organizing and instructing this force for operations behind the enemy lines. Prützmann had studied the guerrilla tactics used by Russian partisans while stationed in Ukraine and the idea was to teach these tactics to the members of Operation Werwolf. As originally conceived, the Werwolf units were intended to be legitimate uniformed military formations trained to engage in clandestine operations behind enemy lines in the same manner as Allied Special Forces such as commandos.

On 21 November 1944, Prützmann was named the General Plenipotentiary to the Nazi puppet state established in Croatia. In early 1945, under orders from Himmler, Prützmann directed the assassination by Werwolf operatives of the Allied-appointed mayor of Aachen, Franz Oppenhoff. After Adolf Hitler's suicide, Prützmann briefly acted as Himmler's representative to the Flensburg government of Großadmiral Karl Donitz, until Dönitz made it clear that he had no interest in Himmler's involvement in the administration. Shortly after the war ended, Prützmann was captured in Lüneburg by elements of the British 2nd Army on 15 May 1945. The next day, while being transported to the interrogation center in Diest, he committed suicide by swallowing a cyanide capsule he had hidden in a cigarette lighter. Some sources incorrectly give 21 May as his date of death, but 16 May is documented by the contemporaneous diary entry of British Major Norman Whittaker who was present at Lüneburg.

== Awards and decorations ==
- Golden Party Badge
- German Cross in Gold
- Iron Cross (1939), 1st and 2nd class
- War Merit Cross, 1st and 2nd class with Swords

== In fiction ==
In the 1972 Frederick Forsyth novel The Odessa File the head of ODESSA is given as SS General Richard Glücks who is determined to destroy the State of Israel nearly two decades after the end of World War II, while the head of ODESSA in Germany is a former SS Officer called the "Werwolf" who is implied to be Prützmann. (If the real Glücks had still been alive he would have been 74 years old and Prützmann would have been 62 in 1963).

== See also ==
- Holocaust in Estonia
- Holocaust in Latvia
- Holocaust in Lithuania
- Holocaust in Ukraine

== Sources ==
- Ezergailis, Andrew, The Holocaust in Latvia 1941–1944 – The Missing Center, Historical Institute of Latvia (in association with the United States Holocaust Memorial Museum) Riga 1996 ISBN 9984-9054-3-8
- Reitlinger, Gerald, The SS: Alibi of a Nation 1922–1945. Viking (Da Capo reprint), New York 1957 ISBN 0-306-80351-8
- Schiffer Publishing Ltd., ed. (2000). SS Officers List: SS-Standartenführer to SS-Oberstgruppenführer (As of 30 January 1942). Schiffer Military History Publishing. ISBN 0-7643-1061-5.
- Williams, Max (2017). SS Elite: The Senior Leaders of Hitler's Praetorian Guard. Vol. 2. Fonthill Media LLC. ISBN 978-1-781-55434-0.
- Williamson, Gordon (1994). The SS:Hitler's Instrument of Terror. Amber Books. ISBN 978-1-907-44656-6.
- Yerger, Mark C. (1997). Allgemeine-SS: The Commands, Units and Leaders of the General SS. Schiffer Publishing Ltd. ISBN 0-7643-0145-4.
