= Standarte (Nazi Germany) =

Nazi paramilitary unit

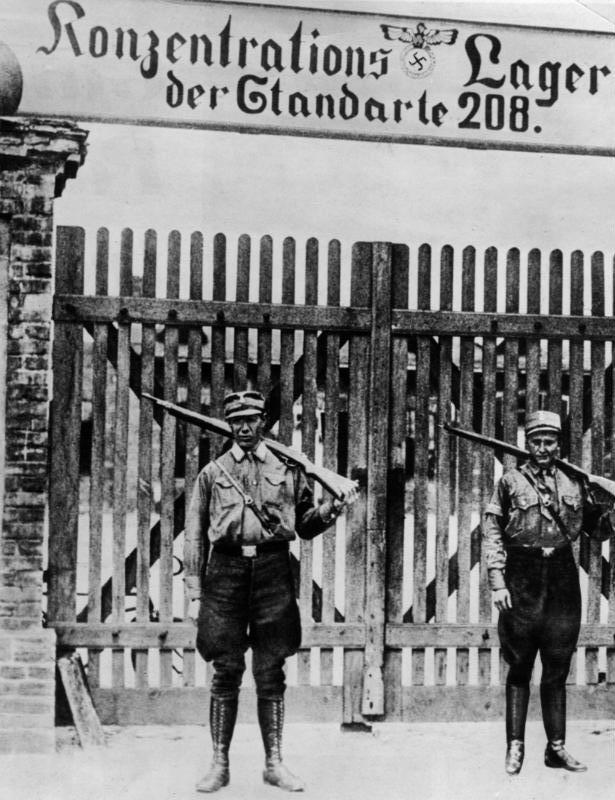
The Oranienburg concentration camp, referred to as Konzentrations Lager der Standarte 208., "Concentration camp of the 208th Standarte [of the SA]."

In Nazi Germany, the Standarte (pl. Standarten) was a paramilitary unit of Nazi Party (NSDAP), Sturmabteilung (SA), NSKK, NSFK, and Schutzstaffel (SS). Translated literally as "Regimental standard", the name refers to the flag paramilitary formations carried in formations and parades.

== Sturmabteilung ==
Vehicle command flag for a SA-Standarte, 1938–1945.

The Sturmabteilung (SA) was organized into several large regional groups (Gruppen). Each Gruppe had subordinate brigades (Brigaden). From 1934 until 1945, subordinate to each brigade were 3 to 9 smaller regiment-sized units called Standarten. SA-Standarten operated in every major German city and were split into even smaller units, known as Sturmbanne (3 to 5 Sturmbanne per Standarte) and Stürme.

=== SA-Standarte "Feldherrnhalle" ===
After the death of Ernst Röhm in 1934, new SA-Stabschef Viktor Lutze reorganized the SA to include the creation of an SA-Standarte, consisting of six battalions of volunteers that were headquartered in different locations throughout Germany: it guarded sensitive SA, state and NSDAP offices in Berlin, Hannover, Hattingen, Krefeld, Munich, Ruhr, Stetten and Stuttgart. After the annexation of Austria in 1938, a seventh battalion was established in Vienna.

In September 1936 the SA-Standarte was given the honorary title “Feldherrnhalle” to commemorate the 1923 Beer Hall Putsch. On Hermann Göring's birthday on 12 January 1937, Lutze made Göring honorary commander of the SA-Standarte "Feldherrnhalle", who transferred control of the unit to the Luftwaffe. Members were now required to undergo military training as well as instruction as parachutists. In 1938 the Regiment was mobilized for use in the occupation of Sudetenland.

When Germany invaded Poland in 1939, members of the SA-Standarte were transferred to the newly formed Fallschirmjäger-Regiment 2, while other members were transferred to the Infantry Battalion “Feldherrnhalle”, which was part of the German Army's Infantry Regiment 271. A detachment of SA-Standarte "Feldherrnhalle" members continued to serve under the SA until May 1945.

=== National Socialist Motor Corps (NSKK) ===
Similarly to the SA, each NSKK Motorbrigade included 3–5 Motorstandarten. A NSKK Transportstandarte Speer existed from May 1940 to June 1941 (later upgraded to a Transportbrigade), while a NSKK Transportstandarte Todt existed from September 1939 to May 1940 (later elevated to a Transportbrigade).

== Schutzstaffel ==
Vehicle command flag for "SS-Standarte 34".

The SS-Standarte was the primary unit of the Allgemeine-SS, named after the term for a "Regimental Standard", or flag. The Standarten were organized into regimental-sized formations each with its own number, but also were referred to by other names, such as location, a popular name, or an honorary title; generally SS or NSDAP members killed before the Nazis obtained national power. For example, the 18th SS-Standarte in Königsberg was named "Ostpreußen" while the 6th SS-Standarte of Berlin was named "Graham Kämmer". There were 127 SS-Standarten. The standard rank for the Standarte leader was that of Standartenführer (colonel).

The SS-Standarte was usually led an SS-Standartenführer, it included 3–4 Sturmbanne and had a normal personnel strength of 1,000–3,000 men. The SS-Standarte corresponded to the Army Regiment. The Sturmbanne I-III were formed from the active members, while the Sturmbann IV was considered a reserve unit.

All SS organizations – such as the Allegemeine-SS and the Reiter-SS, but also the SS-Totenkopfverbände (SS-TV) and the SS-Verfügungstruppe (SS-VT) were divided into Standarten. From 1935 onwards, much to the displeasure of Heinrich Himmler, this designation was replaced by the corresponding military term, Regiment.

After World War II began, the paramilitary Standarten began to shrink in size, some becoming the size of small companies. As of 1945, the foot Standarten of the Allegemeine-SS formally comprised 127 Standarten, most of which, however, only existed on paper and had not even reached the nominal strength prescribed by Himmler.

=== SS-Verfügungstruppe ===
The SS-Standarten of the SS-Verfügungstruppe (SS-St./VT) emerged in the autumn of 1934, when the SS-Standarte "Deutschland" and the SS-Standarte "Germania" were established.

In Berlin, the SS-Sonderkommando Zossen and SS-Sonderkommando Jüterbog were merged into the SS-Sonderkommando Berlin under Sepp Dietrich's command. Then in November 1933, on the 10th anniversary of the Beer Hall Putsch, the Sonderkommando was given the name, Leibstandarte Adolf Hitler (LAH). The following year, the name was changed by Himmler to Leibstandarte SS Adolf Hitler" (LSSAH). After the annexation of Austria, the new SS-Standarte "Der Führer" arose from the merger of the Austro-German SS and parts of the SS-Standarten "Deutschland" and the LSSAH.

The term "SS-Standarte" replaced that of "Regiment" within the SS-VT. Then in October 1939 the SS-VT regiments, Deutschland, Germania and Der Führer, were organized into the SS-Verfügungs-Division with Paul Hausser as commander.

==== SS-Standarte "Deutschland" ====
The SS-Standarte "Deutschland" was formed in 1934 as SS-Standarte 2/VT from formation units Politischen Bereitschaften "Munich" (based in Ellwangen) and "Württemberg" (based in Jagst) and Austrian volunteers. When Hitler excluded the LSSAH from the numbering sequence, the unit was renamed SS-Standarte 1/VT and, in 1935, it was renamed SS-Standarte "Deutschland" and it also received its Deutschland Erwache standard.

In the summer of 1937 the unit became the first to be fully equipped with modern military camouflage clothing. The first model SS-Tarnjacke was designed by Wilhelm Brandt.

==== SS-Standarte "Germania" ====
The SS-Standarte "Germania" was established in 1934 as SS-Standarte 3/VT around from the formation unit Politische Bereitschaft "Hamburg". When Hitler excluded the SS-LSSAH from the numbering sequence, the unit was renamed SS-Standarte 2/VT and, in 1935, it was renamed SS-Standarte "Germania". It was renamed SS-Standarte "Germania" in 1936 and it also received its Deutschland Erwache standard.

The unit took part in the annexation of Austria and was responsible for the security during the Benito Mussolini's visit to Germany. It took part in the annexation of Sudetenland attached to army units. It later served as a guard regiment in Prague until July 1939. It took part in the invasion of Poland attached to the 14th Army

=== SS-Totenkopfverbände ===
On 26 June 1933, Himmler appointed then SS-Oberführer Theodor Eicke the Kommandant of the Dachau concentration camp. Eicke requested a permanent unit that would be subordinate only to him and the SS-Wachverbände was formed. Following the Night of the Long Knives in the summer of 1934, Eicke – who played a role in the affair by shooting SA chief Ernst Röhm – was promoted and officially appointed Inspector of Concentration Camps and Commander of SS-guard formations. In 1935, as the concentration camp system within Germany expanded, groups of camps were organized into Wachsturmbanne (battalions) under the office of the Inspector of Concentration Camps. On 29 March 1936, concentration camp guards and administration units were officially designated as the SS-Totenkopfverbände (SS-TV). In 1937, the Wachsturmbanne were in turn organized into three main SS-Totenkopfstandarten (regiments). The first for service at Dachau, the second at Sachsenhausen, and the third at Buchenwald. Then during the autumn of 1938, a fourth unit was created for the latest concentration camp at Mauthausen.

By April 1938, the SS-TV had four Standarten of three battalions with three infantry companies, one machine gun company and medical, communication and transportation units. On 17 August 1938 Hitler decreed, at Himmler's request, the SS-TV to be the official reserve for the SS-VT. By October 1939, a new SS military division the SS-Totenkopf was formed. The Totenkopf was initially formed from concentration camp guards of the Standarten of the SS-TV, police and SS reservists and soldiers from the SS-Heimwehr "Danzig. Members of other SS militias were also transferred into the division in early 1940; all these units were involved in multiple massacres of civilians, political leaders and prisoners of war.

== Notable Standarten ==
- 1st SS Standarte: First SS regiment of the Allgemeine-SS Order of Battle
- SA-Standarte Feldherrnhalle: An elite SA unit that guarded various Nazi headquarters office, including the supreme headquarters of the Sturmabteilung itself.

== See also ==
- Regiment
- Allgemeine-SS order of battle

== Bibliography ==
- Cook, Stan; Bender, R. James (1994). Leibstandarte SS Adolf Hitler: Uniforms, Organization, & History. San Jose, CA: R. James Bender. ISBN 978-0-912138-55-8.
- Flaherty, Thomas H., ed. (2004) [1988]. The Third Reich: The SS. Time-Life. ISBN 978-1-84447-073-0.
- Orth, Karin (2010). "The Concentration Camp Personnel". In Jane Caplan; Nikolaus Wachsmann (eds.). Concentration Camps in Nazi Germany: The New Histories. New York: Routledge. ISBN 978-0-41542-651-0.
- Padfield, Peter (2001) [1990]. Himmler: Reichsführer-SS. London: Cassel & Co. ISBN 0-304-35839-8.
- Stein, George (2002) [1966]. The Waffen-SS: Hitler's Elite Guard at War 1939–1945. Cerberus Publishing. ISBN 978-1841451008.
- Sydnor, Charles (1990) [1977]. Soldiers of Destruction: The SS Death's Head Division, 1933–1945. Princeton, NJ: Princeton University Press. ISBN 0691008531.
- Weale, Adrian (2012). Army of Evil: A History of the SS. New York; Toronto: NAL Caliber (Penguin Group). ISBN 978-0-451-23791-0.
- Yerger, Mark C. (1997). Allgemeine-SS: The Commands, Units, and Leaders of the General SS. Atglen, PA: Schiffer. ISBN 0-7643-0145-4.
