= Dienstalterslisten der SS =

Lists on SS personnel

Dienstalterslisten der Schutzstaffel der NSDAP (English: SS seniority lists of the NSDAP), were official documents that were issued in book form by the Reichsführung-SS (“SS-Personalamt”) between 1934 and 1945.

Up until 1942, these lists included the higher officer corps (SS-Obergruppenführer—SS-Standartenführer), the middle officer corps (SS-Oberführer—SS-Sturmbannführer) and the lower officer corps (SS-Hauptsturmführer—SS-Untersturmführer).

On the whole, it can be said that these lists of officers included the entire range of the NSDAP's Schutzstaffel (SS) and not only officers of the Allgemeine SS (General SS), but also those of the SS-Totenkopfverbände, the SS-Verfügungstruppe, the Leibstandarte SS Adolf Hitler and the Sicherheitsdienst Reichsführer SS included.

The SS officer lists were used by the allies in 1946 to convict and punish SS officers at the Nuremberg trials.

== History ==
=== 1934—1938 ===
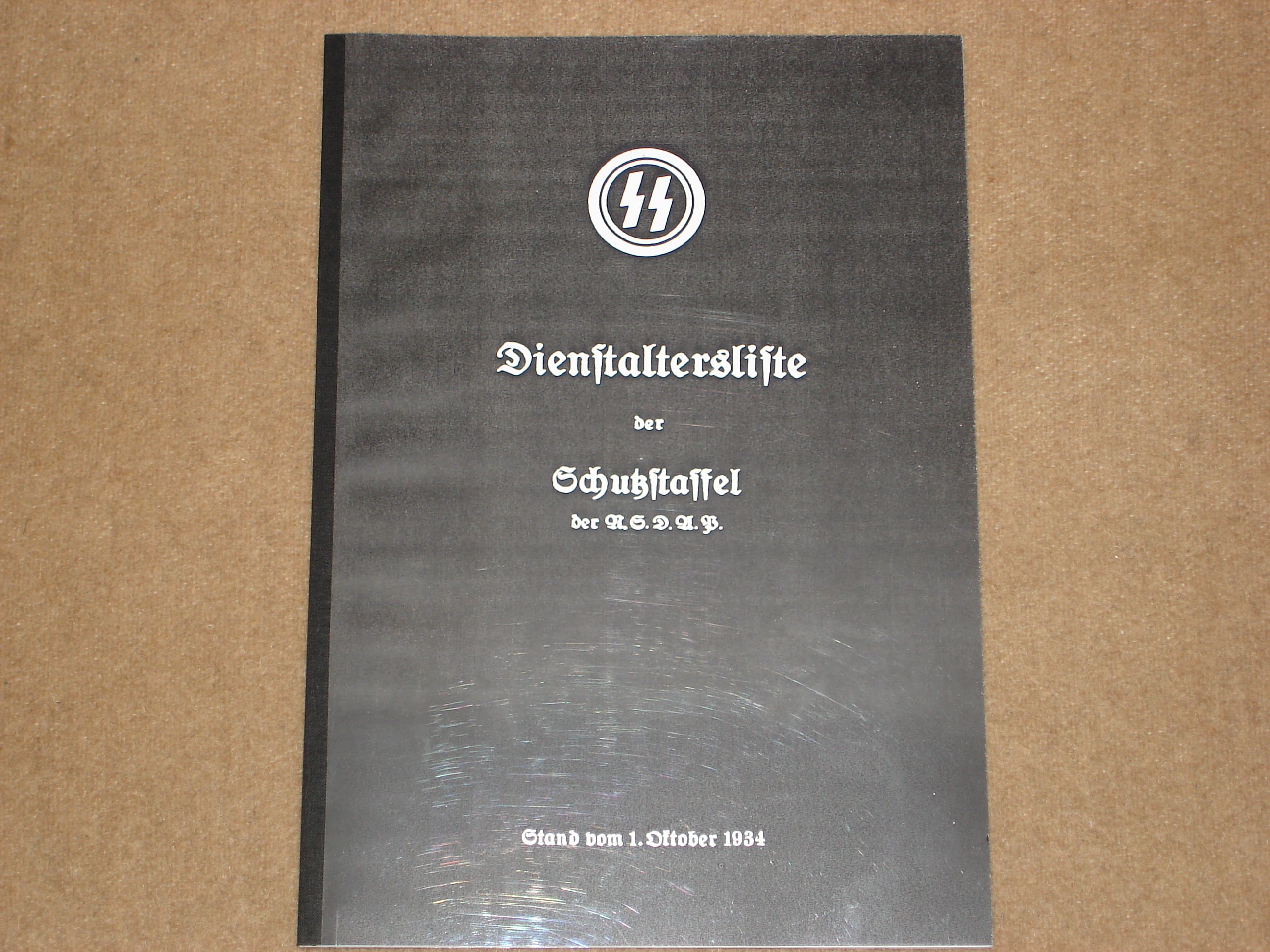
Cover of the Dienstaltersliste der SS (1934)

On October 1, 1934, the “SS-Personalamt” (SS Personnel Office) published the first list of SS officers, which officially documented all ranks of SS-Obergruppenführer—SS-Sturmführer.

In this list, an attempt was made to document the career of an SS officer. Heinrich Himmler's career within the SS was only given in the abbreviated form: 1926 Gau-SS-Führer Niederbayern, 1927 Stellvertr. RFSS (Deputy RFSS), 6.1.1929 Reichsführer SS.

“Oberster Führer der SS” (Supreme leader of the SS) was Adolf Hitler, as the front page inside showed propagandistically.

Once a year, SS leaders had to request so-called “Führer-Fragebögen” (leader questionnaires) from the regional SS personnel leader in the SS-Oberabschnitt, which were used to update the known personal data.

This list of SS officers should be available to every “SS-Oberabschnitt” (SS Region), “SS-Abschnitt” (SS District), and every “SS-Stammabteilung” (Supplementay Reserve of the SS), as these were generally not authorized to view the “SS-Stammrollen” (SS main roles) and “SS-Stammkarten” (SS main cards).

The SS officers' lists from 1934 and 1935 also included the so-called “SS-Ehren- und Rangführer” (honorary and rank leaders of the SS). Honorary leaders of the SS were ranks to which in the eyes of Heinrich Himmler, a suitable person could be appointed and included the ranks SS-Standartenführer-SS-Gruppenführer. They were obliged to wear their SS uniform on special occasions, but were exempt from SS service and had no authority over other SS members.

Max Amann, Walter Buch, and Albert Forster were three of these so-called “SS-Ehrenführer“ (honorary leaders of the SS). Rudolf Hess resigned from the SS in autumn 1933, so that the DALs showed by 1938 that Hess was “authorized by the Führer's order”, “to wear the uniform of an SS-Obergruppenführer.”

Hess was the 50th member of the SS. Himmler's so-called “schwarzer Orden” (Himmler's Black Order) belonged Hess from November 1, 1925, to September 1933. After his voluntary resignation from the SS, Hess was listed in the DALs as SS leader at #2 until 1938. In the DALs, he was positioned below the Reichsführer SS, although his former SS number (SS-Nr. 50) was not listed.

Most of the honorary leaders of the SS were organized in their role as “zugeteilte SS-Führer” (assigned SS leaders) for their “Ehrendienstleistung” in an SS-Oberabschnitt, in an SS-Standarte (SS Regiment), or in an SS-Stammabteilung.

“SS-Rangführer” (Rank leaders of the SS) were also honorary persons who belonged to the rank group SS-Untersturmführer—SS-Sturmbannführer. They, too, were exempt from SS service and had no authority whatsoever. Here, again, there was an obligation to wear the SS uniform on certain official occasions. This kind of the honorary leader of the SS, referred to as rank leaders, were usually assigned to an SS-Standarte, an SS-Sturmbann (SS Battalion), an SS-Reserve-Sturmbann (SS Reserve Battalion), an SS-Sturm (SS Company), or the SS-Sammelstelle (SS Collection Point). Only a few of these honorary leaders had been assigned to an SS-Oberabschnitt or an SS-SS-Abschnitt.

After 1936, the majority of them were assigned to the “Stab Reichsführer SS.”

Also since 1936 police officers were also included in the seniority lists if they had joined the General SS. Himmler's position within the SS was indicated in this SS officer list as „Reichsführer SS und Chef der Deutschen Polizei.“

In the lists of officers of the SS, which appeared before the Second World War, it was indicated which party badge, which order of war, and which country order of the First World War an SS officer was in possession. Also, whether an SS officer in possession of the „Ehrendegen RFSS“ (sword of honor RFSS) and “SS-Totenkopfring” (the skull ring of the SS) and whether this was a member of the Lebensborn.

The NSDAP number, SS number, and whether the SS officer had acquired the obligatory “SA-Wehrabzeichen”, the “Deutsches Reitabzeichen”, and the “Goldenes Parteiabzeichen” were also given. It was also stated whether the SS officer had had an official position in the state (membership of the Reichstag, etc.) since at least 1933.

In 1938 the last edition of the SS officer lists came out before World War II; in 1939, only one amendment sheet followed.

1935–1938, all SS officer lists had statistics. For example, at the beginning of the actual list, reference was made to deceased SS leaders (“Ihre Ehre hieß Treue –Verstorbene SS-Führer”[Their honor was called Loyalty—Deceased SS Leaders]).

From 1935, the officers' lists also included the “Führernachwuchs” trained at the SS-Junkerschulen. Ultimately, the lists ended with an overview of the SS leaders available and those who had resigned. The latter were SS officers who either switched to the Wehrmacht or were dismissed by the Reichsführer SS at their own request and/or dismissed or excluded by the Reichsführer SS.

In the statistics, the growth of the “SS-Führer-Korps” was shown in graphics. There was also an overview of how many of the SS leaders did not belong to the NSDAP. An overview map showed the current SS-Oberabschnitte. Even, an overview of the SS-Abschnitte, the SS-Standarten, the standards of the Reiter-SS (SS Cavalry), the SS-Nachrichtensturmbanne (SS Signals Battalions) and SS-Pionier-Sturmbanne (SS Engineer Battalions), as well as the SS-Motorkraftfahrstürme (SS Motor Transport Companies) and the SS-Sanitätsstaffel (SS Medical Company) were attached to these seniority lists. Finally, the lists of officers of the SS ended with an addendum section, in which personnel changes that had taken place after the entry sheets had closed were pointed out.

=== 1942—1945 ===
The first war edition of the SS officers' lists appeared in January 1942. Only the ranks SS-Obergruppenführer—SS-Standartenführer were listed. At the same time, the “hauptberufliche SS-Führer” (full-time SS leader) were shown on this list for the first time. In addition, it was now also indicated what rank an SS officer had reached in the Wehrmacht and/or the police. And the SS Personnel Main Office has now decided not to list the deceased SS officers anymore.

Even in the war editions of the SS officer lists, Adolf Hitler is always mentioned as the highest SS leader; this changes in October 1942. From October 1942 the lists of officers of the SS appeared as partial editions, whereby Hitler no longer appeared in the first partial edition in the function of “Oberster Führer der Schutzstaffel” (Supreme Leader of the SS).

Since 1942, the SS officer lists had a simplified structure and were structured according to „surname, first name“, “date of birth”, “SS number”, and “position/function”. Orders, decorations, etc. were indicated by small symbols behind the names. Only the last stage of promotion was displayed, while the pre-war editions had shown the entire history of promotion.

The number of war medals from the Second World War rose in the officer lists of the SS. It was expanded to include the following awards: “Wiederholungsspange zum EK II” (Repeat clasp Iron Cross second class), “Wiederholungsspange zum EK I” (Repeat clasp Iron Cross First class), “Ritterkreuz zum Eisernen Kreuz”, “Eichenlaub zum Ritterkreuz”, “Schwerter zum Eichenlaub”, “Eichenlaub mit Brillianten”,

“Kriegsverdienstkreuz” (in two classes, either with or without swords), “Ritterkreuz des Kriegsverdienstkreuzes” (either with or without swords). It was also recorded whether an SS officer at the front had received the “Deutsches Kreuz” in silver or gold.

In the summer of 1944, Heinrich Himmler's Kommandoamt der Waffen-SS (Command Office of the Waffen SS) insisted that the head of the main personnel office, Maximilian von Herff, receive a separate list of seniority for the Waffen SS. The top management of the command office argued that the General SS (Allgemeine SS) would de facto no longer exist since the outbreak of war. Of the 204,000 SS men in the General SS, 60–70 percent would be doing their military service in the Wehrmacht, around 60,000 would be assigned to the IKL and the concentration camps, and the Waffen SS itself would comprise around 900,000 soldiers. Apart from about 10,000 full-time SS leaders, who are organizationally subordinate to the SS-Hauptämter (SS Main Offices), and thus to the Waffen SS, the active General SS would only consist of about 48,000 members.

On July 1, 1944, this seniority list of the Waffen-SS (“Dienstaltersliste der Waffen-SS”) was issued as a single exemplar for Maximilian von Herff. In addition to the officers of the Waffen SS at the front, this also included the SS officers in “K.L. Dienst,” that is, the department of the SS-Wirtschaft-Verwaltungshauptamt, Amtsgruppe D. Also, the majority of the Höhere SS- und Polizeiführer were added to the Waffen-SS, so that, in addition to their rank in the General SS, they also held the corresponding military status of the Waffen-SS: “SS-Gruppenführer and Generalleutnant of the Waffen-SS.” The SS- und Polizeiführer, on the other hand, were assigned to the Ordnungspolizei, so that they had a corresponding police rank in addition to their SS rank: “SS-Standartenführer and Oberst of the Ordnungspolizei”, or “SS-Oberführer and Oberst of the Polizei.”

The list of the Waffen-SS included the rank groups SS-Obergruppenführer—SS-Hauptsturmführer.

On October 1, 1944, the first partial edition of the last few years became the SS officer list, the rank group SS-Obersturmbannführer—SS-Sturmbannführer. This content for November 9, 1944, the second partial edition, the rank group SS-Oberst-Gruppenführer—SS-Standartenführer.

On January 30, 1945, several supplements appeared to the SS officer lists published in October and November 1944, which were published in the Personalveränderungsblatt der SS, 11. Jahrgang, Nr. 1 a (SS Personnel Change Gazette, 11th year, No. 1 a).

== List of the SS-Dienstalterslisten (1934—1944) ==
1. SS-DAL, October 1, 1934: SS-Obergruppenführer to SS-Sturmführer
2. SS-DAL, July 1, 1935: SS-Obergruppenführer to SS-Untersturmführer
3. SS-DAL, December 1, 1936: SS-Obergruppenführer to SS-Untersturmführer
4. SS-DAL, December 1, 1937: SS-Obergruppenführer to SS-Untersturmführer
5. SS-DAL, December 1, 1938: SS-Obergruppenführer to SS-Untersturmführer
6. SS-DAL, January 30, 1942: SS-Obergruppenführer to SS-Standartenführer
7. SS-DAL, April 20, 1942: SS-Obergruppenführer to SS-Standartenführer
8. SS-DAL, October 1, 1942: SS-Obersturmbannführer to SS-Sturmbannführer
9. SS-DAL, Mai 5, 1943: SS-Obergruppenführer to SS-Standartenführer
10. SS-DAL, October 1, 1943: SS-Obersturmbannführer to SS-Sturmbannführer
11. SS-DAL, January 1, 1944: SS-Obergruppenführer to SS-Standartenführer
12. SS-DAL, July 1, 1944: SS-Obergruppenführer to SS-Hauptsturmführer der Waffen-SS
13. SS-DAL, October 1, 1944: SS-Obersturmbannführer to SS-Sturmbannführer
14. SS-DAL, November 9, 1944: SS-Obergruppenführer to SS-Standartenführer

== Bibliography ==
- Nikolaus von Preradovich: Die Schutzstaffel der NSDAP. Eine Dokumentation, Druffel & Vowinckel-Verlag, Stegen/Ammersee 2004, ISBN 3-8061-1138-3, Chapter: “Die Dienstalterslisten der ‚Schutzstaffel 1934–1944‘” (p. 79 ff), & „Die Dienstaltersliste der Waffen-SS“ (p. 264 ff)
- Robin Lumsden: A Collector's guide to: The Allgemeine-SS, Ian Allan Publishing 1992/2001, ISBN 978-0-7110-2905-7, Chapter: “Personnel Records and the Dienstaltersliste” (p. 41)
