= Karl Freiherr Michel von Tüßling =

German SS officer (1907–1991)

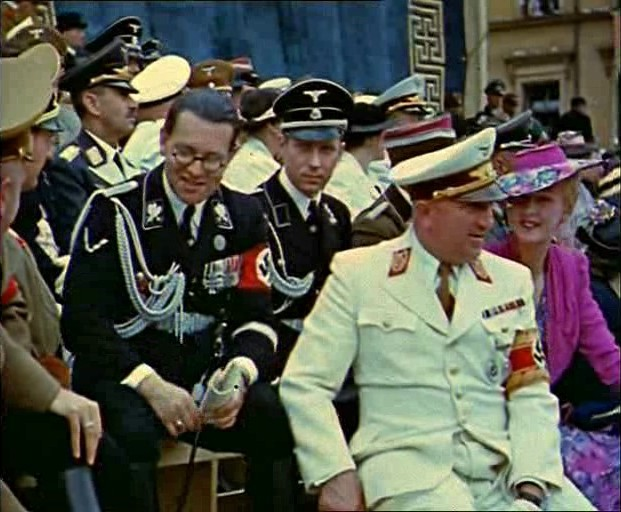
- (from left) Philipp Bouhler, von Tüßling (center), and Robert Ley with his wife Inga; Munich, July 1939
- Born: 27 July 1907; Tüßling, Bavaria, Germany
- Died: 30 October 1991 (aged 84); Tüßling, Bavaria, Germany
- Military career
- Allegiance: Nazi Germany
- Branch: Schutzstaffel
- Service years: 1933–1945
- Rank: Sturmbannführer
- Service number: NSDAP #1 726 624; SS #56 074; SS Zivilabzeichen # 106 983
- Conflicts: World War II
- Awards: SS-Ehrendegen, SA Sports Badge, Iron Cross 2nd Class and 1st Class

Karl Richard Freiherr Michel von Tüßling (27 July 1907 – 30 October 1991) was a German Schutzstaffel (SS) officer who served in the Nazi government of dictator Adolf Hitler, in the staff of the Reichsführer SS and in the staff of the SS Main Office. From 1936 onwards, he also was the personal adjutant of Reichsleiter and SS-Obergruppenführer Philipp Bouhler, who was in charge of Hitler's Chancellery (Kanzlei des Führers), head of the euthanasia programme Aktion T4, as well as co-initiator of Aktion 14f13. In 1947 Tüßling provided an affidavit in defense of war criminal Viktor Brack who was sentenced to death at the Nuremberg trials.

== Biography ==
=== Early life ===
Karl Freiherr Michel von Tüßling was born in Tüßling, Bavaria, as the second child of Alfred Freiherr Michel v. Tüßling (1870–1957) and Hertha Gräfin Wolffskeel v. Reichenberg (1877–1948). He grew up on the Upper Bavarian estate of Tüßling castle, which his father bought in 1905. After the First World War he graduated from high school (Abitur) and studied forestry at the Ludwig-Maximilians-Universität München. He graduated as a Diplom-Forstwirt.

Michel von Tüßling came from a national conservative family. His father had served as a Major (reserve) of the Bavarian Army. His uncle Eberhard Wolffskeel von Reichenberg (1875–1954) served as a Major in the Imperial Army. As chief of staff to Fakhri Pasha, deputy commander of the Ottoman Fourth Army, he was actively involved in the Armenian genocide. His uncle Richard von Michel-Raulino (1864–1926) was a committed member of the German National People's Party as well as publisher and owner of the national conservative Bamberger Tagblatt newspaper. His older sister Freda (1905–1936) was married to the Nazi Henning von Nordeck (1895–1978), who served as a SS-Standartenführer in the staff of the Reichsleitung SS, as early as 1934.

=== Nazi Party and SS career ===
Michel von Tüßling joined the SS (Motorized Unit 2) in Munich in April 1933, shortly after the Nazi Party (NSDAP) seized national power. In summer 1933 he was transferred to the 1st SS-Standarte in Munich, that was commanded by Viktor Brack, who was also chief of staff to the Reich Secretary of the NSDAP, Reichsleiter Philipp Bouhler. In August 1934, Bouhler became police chairman of Munich, and only a month later, he was appointed chief of Adolf Hitler's Chancellery. In 1935 Bouhler summoned Michel von Tüssling to Berlin, where he became a commissioned officer, rising to the rank of Untersturmführer. He served in Hitler's Chancellery (KdF) and also became a staff officer to the Reichsführer-SS Heinrich Himmler. Shortly after its foundation in December 1935, Michel von Tüßling became a member of the SS organization Lebensborn.

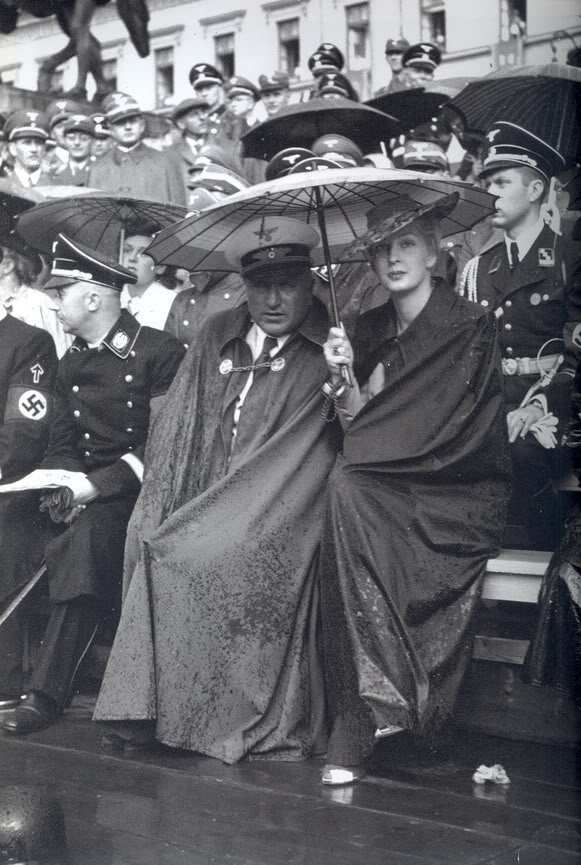
(from left) Heinrich Himmler, Robert Ley with his wife Inga, and von Tüßling (visible behind the umbrella), Munich, 1939

In 1936, he was promoted to Obersturmführer and became Bouhler's personal adjutant. Brack was appointed chief of Main Office 2 (Hauptamt II). Bouhler's office was responsible for all correspondences for Hitler which included private and internal communications, appeals from party courts, official judgments, and clemency petitions. In 1937, he also became a staff officer at the SS Main Office, and was promoted to Hauptsturmführer in 1938. Michel von Tüßling continued his service in Hitler's Chancellery and the SS, and remained the personal adjutant of Bouhler throughout the Aktion T4, the programme of involuntary euthanasia, that ran officially from September 1939 to August 1941, killing more than 70,000 people. On 30 January 1941, Michel von Tüßling was promoted to Sturmbannführer.

In 1941, Bouhler and Himmler initiated Aktion 14f13. Bouhler instructed the head of the Hauptamt II, Viktor Brack who had already been in charge of the various front operations of T4, to implement this order. Aktion 14f13 killed 15,000–20,000 concentration camp prisoners. Many KdF employees who participated in T4 later joined Operation Reinhard, the Nazi plan under Odilo Globocnik to exterminate Polish Jews in the General Government district of German-occupied Poland, that was executed from October 1941 till November 1943.

In the 1943 and 1944 SS Officers list (Dienstalterslisten der SS), Michel von Tüßling was listed under the number '2007', serving as a staff officer in the SS-Hauptamt. The SS-Hauptamt maintained for other branches of the SS, the "paper trail" for such activities as the Einsatzgruppen, Final Solution and the commission of the Holocaust. Later on 10 May 1945, Bouhler was captured and arrested by American troops. He committed suicide on 19 May 1945 while in the U.S. internment camp at Zell am See in Austria.

Michel von Tüßling was interned at Regensburg Internment Camp, from where he provided an affidavit in defence of Viktor Brack in 1947. In this affidavit he also describes their (Brack, Bouhler, Michel von Tüßling) relation to Adolf Hitler's private secretary Martin Bormann; (excerpt):

Brack was an outspoken opponent of Bormann's policy, especially of the NSDAP totality demands advocated by Bormann. I know this very definitely, because Brack repeatedly asked me to use my personal influence to induce Reichsleiter Bouhler to adopt a more active attitude against Bormann's efforts. Bouhler certainly shared Brack's and my opinion of Bormann, but in spite of our remonstrances did not alter his passive attitude to Bormann. ... I am convinced that he [Brack] did not regard the SS as an organisation for the perpetration of crimes. His attitude to the Jewish question did not correspond to the usual SS conception. He was on good terms with several Jews of mixed descent and in his official capacity repeatedly acted on behalf of Jews who applied to him for assistance.

— Karl Baron Michel von Tüßling, Regensburg, 31 March 1947

During the Nuremberg "Doctors' trial", Brack was accused of war crimes and crimes against humanity: Nazi human experimentation, mass murder under the guise of euthanasia, his relation to Aktion 14f13, and his involvement to the implementation of the Final Solution. Brack was found guilty and executed at Landsberg Prison in 1948.

Michel von Tüßling was able to conceal his wartime KdF- and SS-activity from the American prosecutors. At the Nuremberg Doctors trial, he affirmed an affidavit that in September 1939 he was drafted into the Luftwaffe, where he served until the end of the war. After his release from the detention center in 1948, he returned to Tüßling and worked as a farmer. Along with Brack and Bouhler, one of his close Nazi Party friends was the former Minister of Armaments and War Production Albert Speer, who regularly visited him on his estate following his release from Spandau Prison in 1966. Michel von Tüßling died at Tüßling Castle in 1991.

=== Family ===
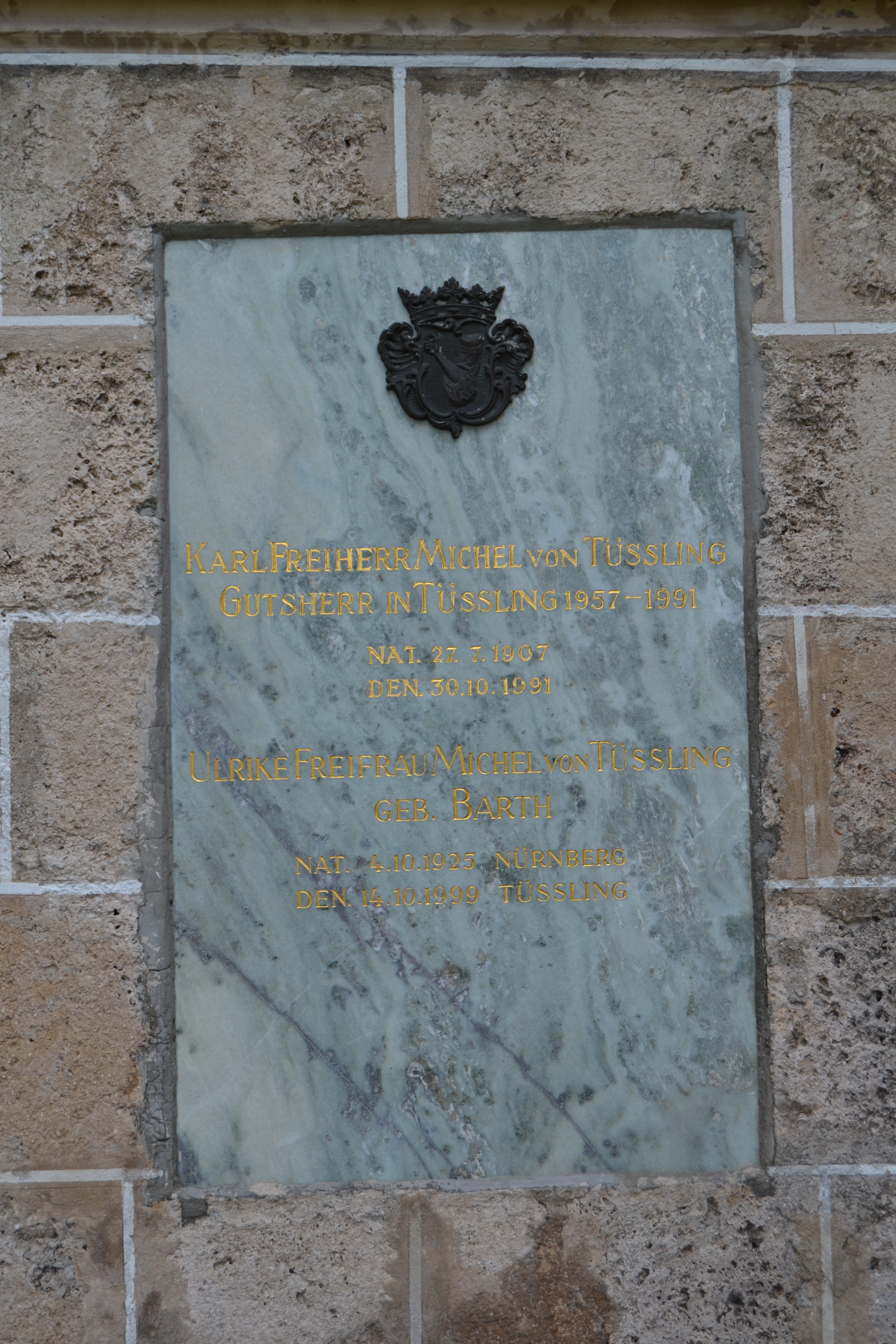
Gravestone of Karl Freiherr Michel von Tüßling and his wife Ulrike, on the pilgrimage church Innocent Children, Heiligenstatt (Tüßling)

Michel von Tüßling was married twice. His first marriage took place on the 16 May 1938 to Elisabeth von Stumm (1918–1996) in Berlin; divorced, Traunstein, 22. December 1948. His second marriage took place on the 14 November 1960 to Ulrike Barth (1925–1999) in Munich. He had three children. His daughter, Stephanie Gräfin Bruges-von Pfuel (born 1961), who inherited her father's estate, was from 1. May 2014 till 30. April 2020 mayor of Tüßling (CSU). In her first marriage she was married to Benedict Count Batthyány (born 1960), whose aunt Margit Batthyàny aka "The Killer Countess" (Note: During the final days of World War II, on 24 March 1945, she hosted a party for SS officers, Gestapo leaders, Nazi Youth, and local collaborators at the Thyssen's castle at Rechnitz during which 200 Jews were slaughtered. Whether Margit herself personally killed anyone at the party is disputed.) (1911–1989), a daughter of Heinrich Thyssen, maintained a reconvalescence home for members of the SS (Rechnitz massacre). From 1999–2005 she was married to Christian Graf Bruges-von Pfuel (* 1942), grandson of General der Panzertruppe Leo Geyr von Schweppenburg. His daughter Ulrike (born 1962) married in 1988 Eckbert von Bohlen und Halbach (born 1956), a member of the Krupp family and nephew of the industrialist Alfried Krupp von Bohlen und Halbach, who was convicted after World War II of crimes against humanity; divorced 1995. Michel von Tüßling's sister Freda (1905–1936) was married to the Alter Kämpfer, SS-Standartenführer Henning von Nordeck (1895–1978). His cousin Lilly (1892-1973) was married to Willy Messerschmitt (1898–1978). The second husband of his cousin Marie (1893-1978), Karl Freiherr von Thüngen (1893-1944) was a general in the Wehrmacht who was executed in 1944 after the failed 20 July Plot.

== Officer ranks ==
=== SS ===
- 1935: SS-Untersturmführer
- 1936: SS-Obersturmführer
- 1938: SS-Hauptsturmführer
- 1941: SS-Sturmbannführer

=== Wehrmacht ===
- until 1942: Leutnant der Reserve (military reserve, Wehrmacht)
- 1943: Oberleutnant der Reserve

== Awards and decorations ==
- Iron Cross
  - 2nd Class
  - 1st Class
- SS-Ehrendegen
- SA Sports Badge (bronze)
- SS Zivilabzeichen # 106,983
