= Walter Schmitt =

SS-Obergruppenführer

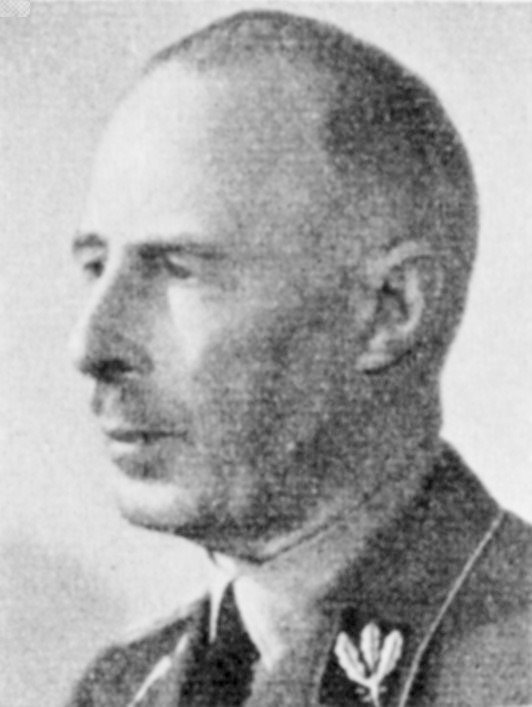
- Born: 13 January 1879; Hamburg, German Empire
- Died: 18 September 1945 (aged 66); Prague, Czechoslovak Republic
- Military career
- Allegiance: German Empire; Weimar Republic; Nazi Germany
- Branch: Imperial German Army; Reichswehr; Schutzstaffel
- Rank: SS-Obergruppenführer
- Commands: SS Personnel Main Office
- Conflicts: World War I, World War II

Walter Schmitt (13 January 1879 – 18 September 1945) was a German SS-Obergruppenführer and General of the Waffen-SS who served as the Chief of the SS Personnel Main Office. He was also a member of the Reichstag from 1943 to 1945. He was executed as a war criminal.

== Early life and World War I ==
Schmitt was born in Hamburg and attended Realgymnasium there between 1888 and 1898. On 13 January 1899, he joined the Imperial German Army as a Fahnenjunker (military cadet) in Infantry Regiment 77 (2nd Hannover) based in Celle, and attended a military school for a year in Metz. He graduated and was commissioned with the rank of Leutnant. In 1906, he was assigned to train as a weapons officer in a rifle factory. From 1906 to 1910, he was adjutant to a battalion of Infantry Regiment 71 (3rd Thuringian), headquartered in Erfurt. In January 1910, he was promoted to Oberleutnant and was district adjutant of the Celle district command until 1913.

On 22 March 1914, Schmitt was promoted to Hauptmann and was transferred to a Braunschweig infantry regiment before being deployed as a company commander in the 2nd Reserve Infantry Regiment on the outbreak of World War I. On 9 September 1914, he was captured by French troops and remained a French prisoner of war until 1918. In July 1918 he was released to Switzerland, where he remained as an internee in Bern until 1919. After his return to Germany, he remained in the Reichswehr until being discharged with the rank of Major on 31 December 1920.

== Nazi career and World War II ==
In 1921 Schmitt worked as the head of personnel at a weaving mill in Hamburg. In 1931, he became the honorary assessor of the arbitration committee and a labor judge at the court in Wilhelmsburg, Hamburg and joined the German National People's Party. On 1 August 1931, he joined the Nazi Party (membership number 592,784). In October 1931, he departed the mill and joined the Sturmabteilung (SA) reserves. On 8 February 1932, he joined the Schutzstaffel (SS) (SS number 28,737) and became the leader of the SS squad Ballenstedt. He was promoted several times and became a SS-Hauptsturmführer on 16 February 1934. A month later, he became the personnel officer in the office of Reichsführer-SS Heinrich Himmler. He was promoted to SS-Oberführer on 1 June 1935 and became head of the SS Personnel Department (Personalabteilung), as well as acting as the personal advisor (persönlicher referent) to Himmler. On 30 January 1936, he was promoted to SS-Brigadeführer. On 30 January 1937, he was promoted to SS-Gruppenführer and Inspector of the SS-school in Bad Tölz near Dachau.

Before the referendum on 10 April 1938 on the annexation of Austria to the Third Reich, Schmitt was head of the main security staff. In 1938, he unsuccessfully sought a seat in the Reichstag. Due to the growth of the SS organization, the SS-Personalhauptamt (SS Personnel Main Office) was formed on 1 June 1939 from the personnel department in Himmler's personal staff, and Schmitt became its Chief. He was promoted to SS-Obergruppenführer and General of the Waffen-SS on 20 April 1942. In June of that year, Schmitt became ill and turned over the management of his office to Maximilian von Herff, who formally succeeded him in this post on 1 October 1942. At that time, Schmitt became an officer for special assignment on the Personal Staff Reichsführer-SS. On 8 May 1943, Schmitt replaced Theodor Eicke, who had been killed in the Third Battle of Kharkov, in the Reichstag as a member for constituency 30, Chemnitz–Zwickau, serving until the end of the war.

After the end of the war in Europe, Schmitt was interned and sentenced to death by a Czech People's Court for contributing to the death of hundreds of inmates in Nazi concentration camps in Bohemia, Poland and Germany, as a close aid to Himmler and an inspector of the camps. Nazi concentration camps listed in the court case: Mauthausen, Auschwitz, Ravensbrück, Sachsenhausen and others. On 18 September 1945, Schmitt was executed by hanging in Ďáblice, Prague.

== Awards ==
Schmitt was the recipient of the following awards:

- Iron Cross (1914) 1st and 2nd class
- War Merit Cross 1st and 2nd class with swords
- Wound Badge in Black (1918)
- Golden Party Badge of the NSDAP on 30 January 1943
- Nazi Party Long Service Award
- SS service award
- Honorary Sword of the Reichsfuhrer-SS
- Death's Head Ring of the SS

== See also ==
- Register of SS leaders in general's rank
