= Units and commands of the Schutzstaffel =

Units and commands of the Schutzstaffel were organizational titles used by the SS to describe the many groups, forces, and formations that existed within the SS from its inception in 1923 to the eventual fall of Nazi Germany in 1945.

The SS unit nomenclature can be divided into several different types of organizations, mainly the early titles used by the SS, SS unit titles of the Allgemeine SS, the military formation titles used by the Waffen-SS, titles of commands associated with the SS Security Police, and special units titles used by such SS organizations as the mobile death squad units of the Einsatzgruppen.

== Early SS commands ==
=== 1920–1925 ===
From 1920 through 1925, several early paramilitary terms were used to describe the various groups which would eventually become the SS. Among the most were:

- Saal-Schutz ("Hall-Protection"): Formed at the end of 1920. It was a small permanent guard unit made up of NSDAP volunteers to provide security for Nazi Party meetings in Munich. It was disbanded after Hitler was sentenced to prison in 1924.
- Stabswache ("Headquarters Guard"): Used by several units of the Freikorps, and then adopted by the forerunner of the SS.
- Stosstrupp ("Shock Troops"): A carry over from World War I, early bodyguard unit of the fledgling Nazi Party. A forerunner of the SS bodyguard dedicated to Hitler's protection.
- Schutzkommando ("Protection Command"): Also a title of the Freikorps, this was one of the early names for the SS before the unit adopted its final name of the Schutzstaffel, and was officially recognized in November 1925.

=== 1925–1929 ===
In September 1925, the then fledgling SS established its first organizational structure, using the following titles:

- Oberleitung ("Senior Leadership"): This was the headquarters staff of the SS (then only a mere battalion of the Nazi Stormtroopers) and was headquartered in Munich.
- SS-Gau ("SS-Region"): There were five SS-Regions established throughout Germany, headed by an SS leader known as an SS-Gauführer (Region Leader).
- SS-Staffel ("SS-Squadron"): This was the standard unit of the early SS in the late 1920s. An SS-Squadron contained a company of ten men, headed by an officer known as an SS-Staffelführer (this title was quickly shortened to simply SS-Führer).

=== 1929–1931 ===
In January 1929, after Heinrich Himmler took over leadership of the SS, old organizational titles were done away with and the following terms came into being:

- Oberstab ("Senior Staff"): This was the name of the SS headquarters, which was under Himmler's command as of January, 1929.
- Abteilung ("Department"): The term Abteilung was used to describe the earliest form of the SS Main Offices and were considered subordinate offices attached to the Oberstab. The SS offices of 1929 encompassed administration, personnel, finance, security, and racial matters.
- SS-Oberführerbereiche ("Senior Leadership Area"): By 1930, the old SS-Gaus had been consolidated into three senior leadership areas encompassing east and west Germany (including northern areas of the country) and a region encompassing southern Germany which was considered the most important since this was the location of the main Nazi Party offices. Each Oberführerbereich was commanded by an Oberführer.

=== 1931–1933 ===
In 1931, as SS membership began to surpass 100,000, Himmler again reorganized the SS and created these new command titles:

- SS-Amt ("SS-Office"): Originally in 1931 there were three SS offices; the Headquarters Office (SS-Amt), the Race Office (SS-Rasseamt) and the Security Office (Ic Dienst which became the Sicherheitsdienst in 1932). By 1933, these offices would be renamed under the title of Hauptamt which would remain the standard name for an SS main office for the duration of the group's existence.
- SS-Gruppen ("SS-Groups"): These were the earliest division commands of what would become the Allgemeine SS. There were five SS-Groups originally established: North, South, East, West, and Southwest. Each SS-Group was commanded by a Gruppenführer.
- SS-Brigaden ("SS-Brigades"): The SS brigades were intermediary commands between the SS-Groups and lower SS regiment commands known as Standarte. Each SS-Brigade was commanded by a Brigadeführer.

== Allgemeine-SS commands ==
The core of the "General-SS" were the mustering formations spread throughout Germany, divided into several division sized formations and extending downwards into brigade, regiment, battalion, company, and squad like formations. Most of these formations were "part time" and mustered weekly or monthly without pay. The Allgemeine-SS used unique names for these formations which were different from standard military terms in use by the German military.

Initially, General-SS formations were operated strictly in Germany and Austria but were later formed in occupied countries during World War II. Most often, Allgemeine SS units in occupied territories were "paper commands", formed under the authority of an SS and Police Leader (who would serve as a dual commander) in order to give senior SS officers in occupation commands a command billet within the General-SS.

- SS-Oberabschnitt ("SS-Main District"): This division level command was the main administrative district for the Allgemeine SS in the German Reich and the highest command level in the Allgemeine SS order of battle. The first Oberabschnitte were formed in November 1933 from the five existing SS-Gruppen units and generally conformed to the existing Wehrkreise (Military Districts) of the Wehrmacht. An Oberabschnitt was usually commanded by a Gruppenführer or Obergruppenführer. Once the position of Higher SS and Police Leader was established, Oberabschnitt leaders typically served simultaneously in both positions. The Oberabschnitt commander was known by the title of Führer and was assisted by a staff which typically comprised departments encompassing training, medical affairs, personnel, as well as specialty commands such as signals and engineer battalions.
- SS-Abschnitt ("SS-District"): The Abschnitt commands were formed in the early 1930s from the old SS-Brigades. The function and operation was essentially the same as with the Oberabschnitt, but the units were usually commanded by an SS-Brigadeführer or Oberführer. SS-Abschnitte were designated by Roman numerals while the Oberabschnitt commands were given proper names. As with the Oberabschnitte, these commands were limited to the German Reich and were not established in the occupied territories.
- SS-Standarte ("SS-Regiment"): The Standarten was the primary unit of the General-SS, named after the term for a "Regimental Standard", or flag. The Standarte were organized into regimental-sized formations each with its own number, but also were referred to by other names, such as location, a popular name, or an honorary title; generally SS or NSDAP members killed before the Nazis obtained national power. For example, the 18th SS-Standarte in Königsberg was named "Ostpreußen" while the 6th SS-Standarte of Berlin was named "Graham Kämmer". There were 127 SS-Standarte. The standard rank for the Standarte Leader was that of Standartenführer (colonel).
- SS-Sturmbann ("SS-Storm Unit"): The Sturmbann commands were battalion formations within a Standarte, usually three or four in number. These units were commanded by either a Sturmbannführer or Obersturmbannführer.
- SS-Sturm ("SS-Company"): The Sturm was the company-level formation of the General-SS and the most typical in which an average SS member would associate. Each Sturmbann had 3 to 5 of them. Company commanders usually rated a rank between Untersturmführer and Hauptsturmführer.
- SS-Trupp ("SS-Troop"): SS-Troops were platoon-sized formations. Each Sturm had 3 to 4 of them. They were commanded by an SS non-commissioned officer initially known as a Truppführer. After the Night of the Long Knives, the SS renamed its rank structure and each Trupp then fell under the command of one with the rank of Oberscharführer and Hauptscharführer.
- SS-Schar ("SS-Squad"): SS-Squads were eight to ten man formations that served as the primary mustering unit within each SS-Company. There were 3 for each Trupp. Such units were commanded by an SS-Scharführer with an Assistant Squad Leader rated as an Unterscharführer.
- SS-Rotte ("SS-Section"): This was the smallest unit of the General-SS. It usually consisted of four to five SS members. The SS-Section was commanded by an SS-Rottenführer and consisted of SS troopers holding the rank of Mann or Sturmmann.

=== Cavalry commands ===
The Allgemeine SS also formed several cavalry commands, which were mainly intended to attract German nobility into the ranks of the SS. These formations were little more than equestrian riding clubs and, by the start of World War II, the General-SS Cavalry had mostly ceased to exist except for a handful of members. The command names of the General-SS cavalry were modeled after those of the regular mustering SS formations and were separate from the military cavalry terms of the Waffen-SS.

- SS-Reiterabschnitt ("SS-Cavalry District"): Modeled in the same manner as the SS-Abschnitt commands, only nine of these commands were ever established. They commanded one or more SS-Reiterstandarte. This command level ended in 1936. Thereafter, the SS-Reiterstandarte were under each SS-Oberabschnitt.
- SS-Reiterstandarte ("SS-Cavalry Regiment"): There were twenty-four cavalry regiments established by the Allgemeine SS. These units wore a special crossed lances unit insignia. in comparison to the regular Standarte which displayed a unit patch bearing the Standarten number.

== Waffen-SS commands ==
The Waffen-SS used standard Army military unit titles, in the following hierarchy.

- Army: Only two SS armies were ever established and contained primarily subordinate Regular Army commands
- Corps: Several SS Corps existed; these commands were usually the highest operational position in the Waffen-SS
- Division: There were 38 full divisions established in the Waffen-SS. Many late war SS divisions never reached full strength, some no larger in reality than a battalion.
- Brigades: SS brigades were independently formed at the start of World War II, eventually merged into the higher divisions
- Regiments: The main-stay combat unit of the Waffen-SS, typically commanded by an SS-Standartenführer
- Battalions: Subordinate to a regiment and the first of the "front line" operational combat units
- Companies: Referred to as Kompanie
- Platoons: Referred to as Zug
- Squads: Referred to as Gruppe. This created an oddity in that a Waffen-SS squad leader (usually a junior NCO) was referred to as a Gruppenführer when this title was also a rank equivalent to a lieutenant general.
- Teams: Basic fire team formations of five to seven soldiers

== Senior SS commands ==
By the mid-1930s, the SS leadership had grouped itself into two major senior commands which would last throughout World War II. The two most senior positions in the SS, apart from the Reichsführer-SS, were the SS and Police Leaders and the SS Main Office Commanders.

=== SS and Police Leaders ===
A wartime office which was granted considerable power was that of the SS and Police Leader. This unique position was a command authority of every SS unit in a given geographical area. SS and Police leaders had control over administrative SS commands, Nazi concentration camps, security forces, and (as World War II progressed) certain units of the Waffen-SS.

There were three levels of SS and Police Leaders, these being:

- Supreme SS and Police Leader (Höchster SS- und Polizeiführer (HöSSPF)): These SS and Police Leaders had command over all SS units in a conquered country. There were only two such commands established, one in Ukraine and the other in Italy.
- Higher SS and Police Leader (Höherer SS- und Polizeiführer (HSSPF)): These commands held authority over a region, district, or state. They were "de facto" equal in power inside Germany to their "often nominal superior", the NSDAP regional Gauleiter.
- SS and Police Leader (SS- und Polizeiführer (SSPF)): These SS commands were in charge of specific cities, usually important or significant ones. They were subordinate to the HSSPF.

=== Main office commands ===
By 1942 all activities of the SS were managed through twelve main offices.

- Persönlicher Stab Reichsführer-SS Hauptamt (Personal Staff of the Reich Leader SS)
- SS-Hauptamt (Main Administrative Office; SS-HA)
- SS-Führungshauptamt (SS Main Operational Office; SS-FHA)
- Reichssicherheitshauptamt (Reich Security Main Office; RSHA)
- Ordnungspolizei Hauptamt (Order Police Main Office; Orpo)
- Wirtschafts- und Verwaltungshauptamt (Economic and Administration Main Office; SS-WVHA)
- Hauptamt SS-Gericht (Main Office of SS Legal Matters)
- SS-Rasse- und Siedlungshauptamt (SS Office of Race and Settlement; RuSHA)
- SS-Personalhauptamt (SS Personnel Main Office)
- Hauptamt Volksdeutsche Mittelstelle (Racial German Assistance Main Office; VOMI)
- SS-Schulungsamt (SS Education Office)
- Hauptamt Reichskommissar für die Festigung Deutschen Volkstums (Main Office of the Reich Commissioner for the Consolidation of German Nationhood; RKFDV)

The hierarchy of command in the main offices was:

- Office Chief (Chef): The Chief of a Main Office was referred to by the title of Chef followed by the office code. For instance, Reinhard Heydrich was known by the title Chef der Sicherheitspolizei und des SD (Chief of Security Police and SD) or CSSD, while serving as the overall office commander of the Reich Security Main Office.
- Department Chief (Amtschef): The title of department chief was the most commonly used and held by countless SS officers and could be extended to sub-department heads, as well. For example, Heinrich Müller was department chief of the RSHA "Amt IV" (Dept. 4): the Gestapo. Adolf Eichmann was the commander of Referat IV B4 (Sub-Department IV B4) that was the Gestapo's inner department of Jewish Affairs. He was known as the Amtschef, RSHA (IV-B4), and was Müller's subordinate.
- Chief of Staff (Chef des Stabs): Each department typically had a Chief of Staff, known by the title "Chief of the Staff" to avoid confusion with the title "Stabschef", which was a rank of the Nazi stormtroopers.

Below the level of Department heads existed a plethora of administrative and bureaucratic titles to indicate positions as Assistant Department Heads, staff officers, and other clerical duties within the various main offices.

== Security police commands ==
The offices of the Gestapo in major towns and cities were known as "Stapo-Leitstellen". Smaller towns and some villages maintained smaller Gestapo offices known simply as "Stapostellen". The Sicherheitsdienst was organized in a different manner, grouped in SD-Abschnitte with smaller SD-Unterabschnitte commands (SD districts and sub-districts). Both the Gestapo, SD, and the similarly organized Kriminalpolizei were overseen by an SS Police official known as Inspekteur der Sicherheitspolizei und des SD. In occupied territories, this commander was known by the alternate title Befehlshaber der Sicherheitspolizei und des SD.

== Death's Head commands ==
The Totenkopfverbände maintained a hierarchy of Nazi concentration camp titles, in the following order:

- Kommandant
- Lagerführer
- Rapportführer
- Blockführer

== Special Unit commands ==
The Einsatzgruppen were regimental sized mobile death squads that were further sub-divided into Einsatzkommandos, which were company-sized formations. The Einsatzgruppen units perpetrated atrocities in the occupied Soviet Union, including mass murder of Jews, communists, prisoners of war, and hostages, and played a key role in the Holocaust.
