= Allgemeine SS =

Main branch of the SS (1934–1945)

General SS
- Allgemeine SS
- The general SS was the administrative and non-combative part of the SS.

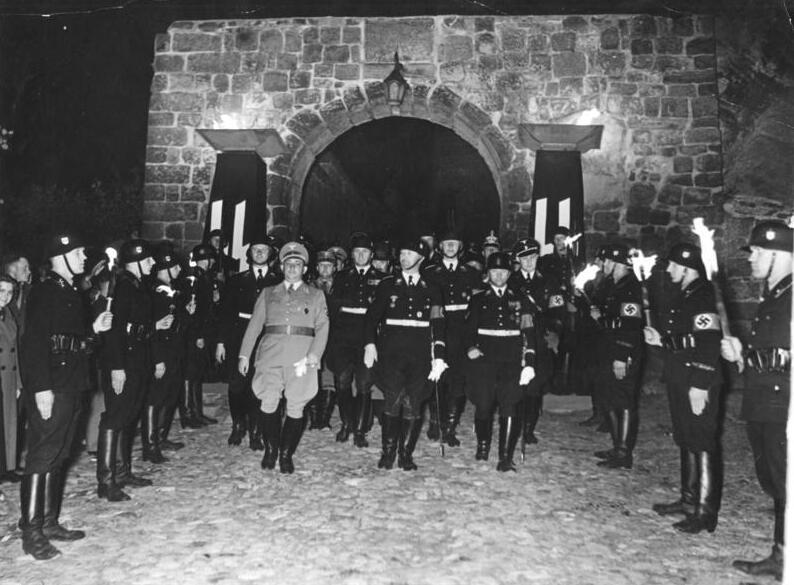
- Reichsführer Heinrich Himmler leads an SS ceremony on the anniversary of the death of Heinrich I at Quedlinburg, July 1938.

Agency overview
- Formed: September 1934
- Preceding agencies: Sturmabteilung; Schutzstaffel
- Dissolved: 8 May 1945
- Jurisdiction: Germany and occupied Europe
- Headquarters: SS-Hauptamt, Prinz-Albrecht-Straße, Berlin; 52°30′26″N 13°22′57″E
- Employees: 100,000 c.1940 40,000 c.1945
- Minister responsible: Heinrich Himmler (1934–1945), Reichsführer-SS
- Parent agency: Schutzstaffel
- Child agencies: RSHA (Gestapo, Sicherheitspolizei, SD and Kriminalpolizei); SS Economic and Administrative Departments (WHVA); SS Courts Office; SS Office of Race and Settlement SS Personalhauptamt SS Education Office Main Welfare Office for Ethnic Germans (RKFDV)

The Allgemeine SS ([ˌalɡəˈmaɪ̯nə ˈɛs ˈɛs]; "General SS") was a major branch of the Schutzstaffel (SS) paramilitary forces of Nazi Germany; it was managed by the SS Main Office (SS-Hauptamt). The Allgemeine SS was officially established in the autumn of 1934 to distinguish its members from the SS-Verfügungstruppe (SS Dispositional Troops or SS-VT), which later became the Waffen-SS, and the SS-Totenkopfverbände (SS Death's Head Units or SS-TV), which were in charge of the Nazi concentration camps and extermination camps. SS formations committed many war crimes against civilians and allied servicemen.

Starting in 1939, foreign units of the Allgemeine SS were raised in occupied countries. From 1940 they were consolidated into the Directorate of the Germanic SS (Leitstelle der germanischen SS). When the war first began, the vast majority of SS members belonged to the Allgemeine SS, but this proportion changed during the later years of the war after the Waffen-SS opened up membership to non-citizen ethnic Germans and non-Germans.

== Early years ==
Adolf Hitler in 1925 ordered Julius Schreck to organise the formation of a new bodyguard unit, the Schutzkommando ("Protection Command"). Hitler wanted a small group of tough ex-soldiers like Schreck, who would be loyal to him. The unit included old Stoßtrupp members like Emil Maurice and Erhard Heiden. The unit made its first public appearance on 4 April 1925. That same year, the Schutzkommando was expanded to a national level. It was also successively renamed the Sturmstaffel ("Storm Squadron") and then finally the Schutzstaffel ("Protection Squadron"; SS) on 9 November 1925. The SS was subordinated to the SA and thus a subunit of the SA and the NSDAP. It was considered to be an elite organization by both party members and the general population.

The main task of the SS was the personal protection of the Führer of the Nazi Party, Adolf Hitler. In 1925 the SS had only 200 active members and in 1926, it ended the year with the same number. There were 280 members in 1928 as the SS continued to struggle under the SA. After Heinrich Himmler took over the SS in January 1929, he worked to separate the SS from the SA. By December 1929, the number of SS members had grown to 1,000. Himmler began to systematically develop and expand the SS with stricter requirements for members as well as a general purge of SS members who were identified as drunkards, criminals, or otherwise undesirable for service in the SS. Himmler's ultimate aim was to turn the SS into the most powerful organization in Germany and most influential branch of the party. By 1930 Himmler had persuaded Hitler to run the SS as a separate organisation, although it was officially still subordinate to the SA.

== Formation and service ==
After the Machtergreifung (seizure of power) by the NSDAP in January 1933, the SS began to expand into a massive organization. By the end of 1932 it included over 52,000 members. By December 1933 the SS increased to 204,000 members and Himmler ordered a temporary freeze on recruitment.

On 20 April 1934, Göring and Himmler agreed to put aside their differences, largely because of their mutual hatred of the SA. Göring transferred control of the Gestapo to Himmler, who was also named chief of all German police forces outside Prussia. Two days later Himmler named Reinhard Heydrich the head of the Gestapo. The SS was further cemented when both it and the Gestapo participated in the destruction of the SA leadership during the Night of the Long Knives from 30 June to 2 July 1934. They either killed or arrested every major SA leader, above all Ernst Röhm.

Himmler was later named the chief of all German police in June 1936, and the Gestapo was incorporated with the Kripo (Criminal Police) into sub-branches of the SiPo. Heydrich was made head of the SiPo and continued as chief of the SD.

In August 1934, Himmler received permission from Hitler to form a new organisation from the SS Sonderkommandos and the Politischen Bereitschaften, the SS-Verfügungstruppe (SS-VT). This was a paramilitary force, which in war was to be subordinate to the Wehrmacht ("Armed Forces"), but remained under Himmler's control in times of peace and under Hitler's personal control regardless. According to this restructure, the SS now housed three different subordinate commands:

1. Allgemeine SS
2. SS-Verfügungstruppe (SS-VT)
3. SS-Wachverbände, known as the SS-Totenkopfverbände (SS-TV) from 29 March 1936, forward

Himmler further conducted additional purges of the SS to exclude those deemed to be opportunists, alcoholics, homosexuals, or of uncertain racial status. This "house cleaning" removed some 60,000 SS members by December 1935. By 1939, the SS had risen again and reached its peak with an estimated 240,000 members.

By the outbreak of World War II in Europe, the SS had solidified into its final form. Correspondingly, the term "SS" could be applied to three separate organizations, mainly the Allgemeine SS, SS-Totenkopfverbände and the Waffen-SS, which until July 1940 was officially known as the SS-VT. When the war first began, the vast majority of SS members belonged to the Allgemeine SS, but this statistic changed during the later stages of the war when the Waffen-SS opened up membership for non-Germans. Further, with Himmler as Chief of the German Police, the SS also controlled the uniformed Ordnungspolizei (Order Police).

== Hierarchy and structure ==
The term Allgemeine-SS referred to the "General SS," meaning those units of the SS considered "main, regular, or standard." By 1938, the Allgemeine SS was administratively divided into several main sections:

- Full-time officers and members of the main SS departments
- Part-time volunteer members of SS regional units
- SS security forces, e.g., the Sicherheitspolizei (SiPo – Gestapo & Kripo) and Sicherheitsdienst (SD)
- Concentration Camp staff of the Totenkopfverbände
- Reserve, honorary or otherwise inactive SS members

After World War II began, the lines between the Allgemeine SS and the Waffen-SS became increasingly blurred, due largely to the Allgemeine SS headquarters offices having administrative and supply command over the Waffen-SS. By 1940, all of the Allgemeine SS had been issued grey war-time uniforms. Himmler ordered that the all-black uniforms be turned in for use by others. They were sent east where they were used by auxiliary police units and west to be used by Germanic-SS units such as the ones in the Netherlands and Denmark.

=== Full time SS personnel ===
Approximately one third of the Allgemeine SS were considered "full time" meaning that they received a salary as government employees, were employed full-time in an SS office, and performed SS duties as their primary occupation. The vast majority of such full-time SS personnel were assigned to the main SS offices that were considered part of the Allgemeine SS. By 1942, these main offices managed all activities of the SS and were divided as follows:

- Hauptamt Persönlicher Stab Reichsführer-SS (Main Office Personal Staff Reichsführer-SS; HaPerStab)
- SS-Hauptamt (SS Main Office; SS-HA)
- SS-Führungshauptamt (SS Leadership Main Office; SS-FHA)
- Reichssicherheitshauptamt (Reich Security Main Office; RSHA)
- SS-Wirtschafts- und Verwaltungshauptamt (SS Main Economic and Administrative Office; SS-WVHA)
- Ordnungspolizei Hauptamt (Order Police Main Office)
- Hauptamt SS-Gericht (SS Court Main Office; HA SS-Gericht)
- SS-Rasse- und Siedlungshauptamt (SS Race and Settlement Main Office; RuSHA)
- SS Personalhauptamt|SS-Personalhauptamt (SS Personnel Main Office; SS PHA)
- Volksdeutsche Mittelstelle (Coordination Center for Ethnic Germans; VoMi)
- SS-Schulungsamt (SS Education Office)
- Reichskommissar für die Festigung deutschen Volkstums; RKFDV (Reich Commissioner for the Consolidation of German Nationhood; RKF or RKFDV)

Main office commanders and staff were exempt from military conscription, although many, such as Heydrich, served as reservists in the regular German military. Main office members did join the Waffen-SS, where they could accept a lower rank and serve in active combat or be listed as inactive reservists. By 1944, with Germany's looming defeat, the draft exemption for the Allgemeine SS main offices was lifted and many junior members were ordered into combat with senior members assuming duties as Waffen-SS generals.

=== SS regional units ===
The core of the Allgemeine SS was part-time mustering formations spread throughout Germany. Members in these regional units would typically meet once a week in uniform, as well as participate in various Nazi Party functions. Activities including drill and ideological instruction, marching in parades, and providing security at various Nazi party rallies.

Regional SS units were organized into commands known as SS-Oberabschnitt meaning "SS-Senior Sector" responsible for commanding a (region), which were subordinate to the SS-HA; SS-Abschnitt (SS-Sector) was the next lower level of command, responsible for administering a (District); Standarten (regiment), which were the basic units of the Allgemeine SS. Before 1934, SS personnel received no pay and their work was completely voluntary. After 1933, the Oberabschnitt commanders and their staff became regarded as "full time" but the rank and file of the Allgemeine SS were still part-time only. Regular Allgemeine SS personnel were also not exempt from conscription and many were called up to serve in the Wehrmacht.

=== Security forces ===
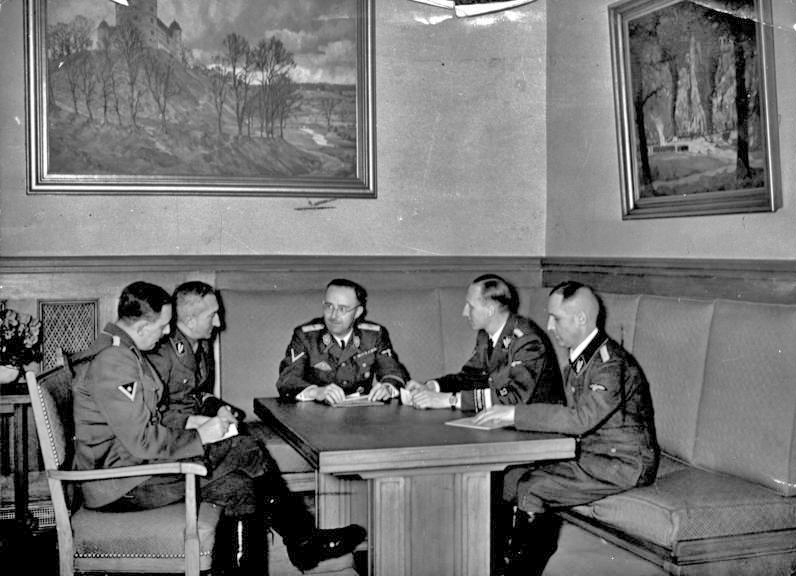
1939 photograph; shown from left to right are Franz Josef Huber, Arthur Nebe, Heinrich Himmler, Reinhard Heydrich and Heinrich Müller. According to the archival caption, these men are planning the investigation of the bomb assassination attempt on Adolf Hitler of 8 November 1939 in Munich.

In 1936, the state security police forces of the Gestapo and Kripo (Criminal Police) were consolidated. The combined forces were folded into the Sicherheitspolizei (SiPo) and placed under the central command of Reinhard Heydrich, already chief of the party Sicherheitsdienst (SD). Later from 27 September 1939 forward, the SD, Gestapo, and Kripo were folded into the Reich Security Main Office (RSHA) that was placed under Heydrich's control. As a functioning state agency, the SiPo ceased to exist. The ordinary uniformed German police, known as the Ordnungspolizei (Orpo), were under SS control after 1936 but were never incorporated into the Allgemeine SS; although many police members were also dual SS members.

The death squad units of the Einsatzgruppen were formed under the direction of Heydrich and operated by the SS before and during World War II. In September 1939, they operated in territories occupied by the German armed forces following the invasion of Poland. Men for the units were drawn from the SS, the SD, and the police. Originally part of the SiPo, in late September 1939 the operational control of the Einsatzgruppen was taken over by the RSHA. When the killing units were re-formed prior to the invasion of the Soviet Union in 1941, the men of the Einsatzgruppen were drawn from the SD, Gestapo, Kripo, Orpo, civilian (SS auxiliary) and Waffen-SS. The Einsatzgruppen units perpetrated atrocities in the occupied Soviet Union, including mass murder of Jews, communists, prisoners of war, and hostages, and played a key role in the Holocaust.

=== Concentration camp personnel ===
All Concentration Camp staff were originally part of the Allgemeine SS under the office of the Concentration Camps Inspectorate (Inspektion der Konzentrationslager or IKL). First headed by Theodor Eicke, the Concentration Camp personnel were formed into the SS-Wachverbände in 1933, which later became known as the SS-Totenkopfverbände (SS-TV). Thereafter, the SS-TV branch increasingly became divided into the camp service proper and the military Totenkopf formation controlled by the SS-VT (forerunner of the Waffen-SS).

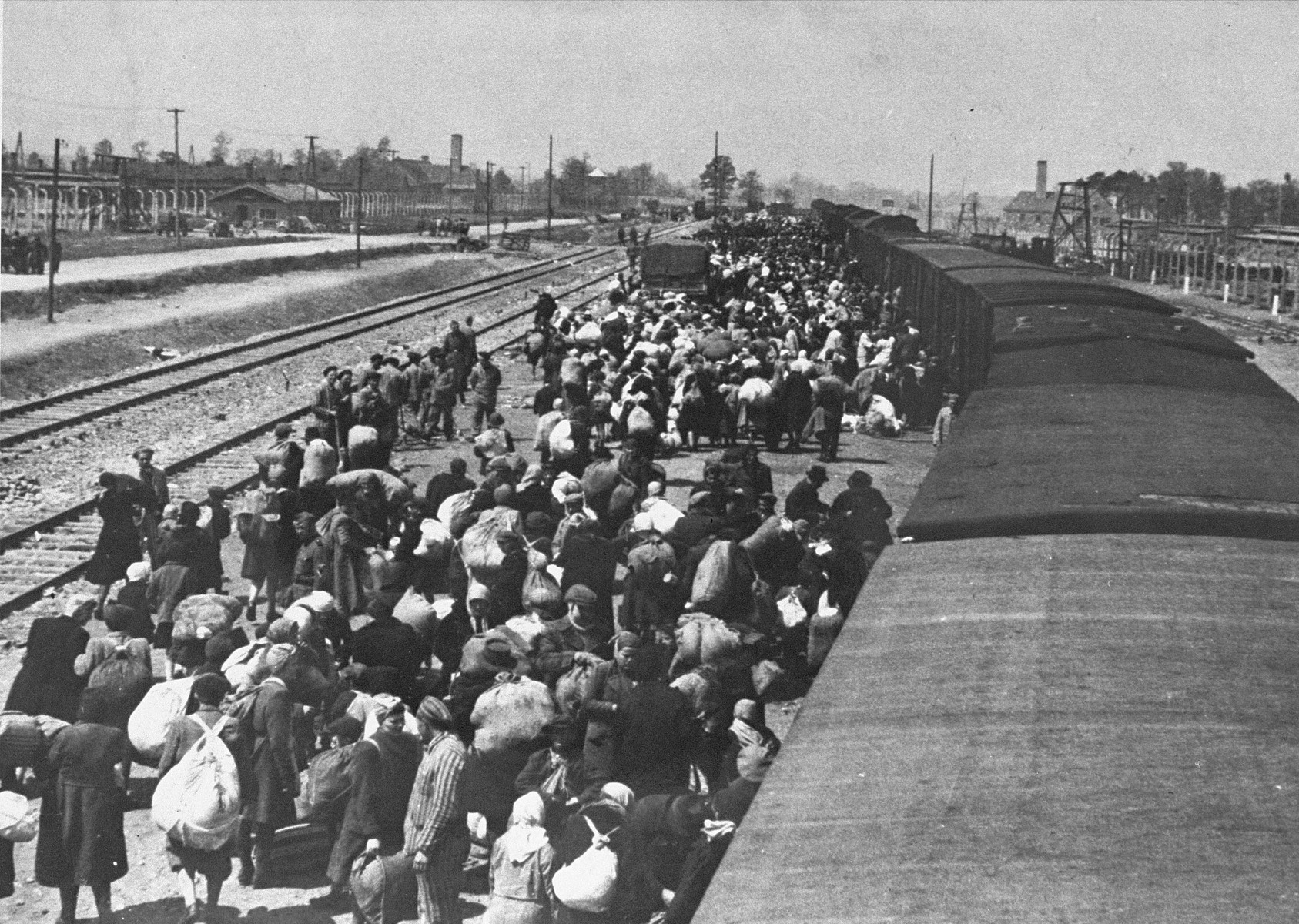
Jews from Carpathian Ruthenia arriving at Auschwitz concentration camp, 1944

As the Nazi regime became more oppressive and World War II escalated, the concentration camp system grew in size, lethal operation, and scope as the economic ambitions of the SS intensified. Intensification of the killing operations took place in late 1941 when the SS began construction of stationary gassing facilities to replace the use of Einsatzgruppen for mass killings.

Victims at these new extermination camps were killed with the use of carbon monoxide gas from automobile engines. During Operation Reinhard, three death camps were built in occupied Poland: Bełżec (operational by March 1942), Sobibór (operational by May 1942), and Treblinka (operational by July 1942). On Himmler's orders, by early 1942 the concentration camp at Auschwitz was greatly expanded to include the addition of gas chambers, where victims were killed using the pesticide Zyklon B.

After 1942, the entire camp service was placed under the authority of the Waffen-SS for a variety of administrative and logistical reasons. The ultimate command authority for the camp system during World War II was the SS-Wirtschafts-Verwaltungshauptamt (WHVA) under Oswald Pohl. Beside the camp operations, the WHVA was the organization responsible for managing the finances, supply systems and business projects for the Allgemeine SS. By 1944, with the concentration camps fully integrated with the Waffen-SS and under the control of the WVHA, a standard practice developed to rotate SS members in and out of the camps, based on manpower needs and also to give assignments to wounded Waffen-SS officers and soldiers who could no longer serve in front-line combat. This rotation of personnel is the main argument that nearly the entire SS knew of the concentration camps, and what actions were committed within them, making the entire organization liable for war crimes and crimes against humanity.

=== Other units ===
By late 1940 the Allgemeine SS controlled the Germanic SS (Germanische SS), which were collaborationist organizations modeled after the Allgemeine SS in several Western European countries. Their purpose was to enforce Nazi racial doctrine, especially anti-Semitic ideals. They typically served as local security police augmenting German units of the Gestapo, SD, and other main departments of the Reich Main Security Office.

The Allgemeine SS also included the SS-Helferinnenkorps (Women’s Helper Corps), composed of female volunteers. These women underwent basic and specialized training that covered telephone, teletype, and radio procedures, cryptography, message handling, as well as ideological instruction and SS ritual practices. They worked in Allgemeine SS's child agencies such as the SS Main Office and the SS Economic and Administrative Office in Berlin, at regional Sicherheitspolizei headquarters in cities such as Kraków and Prague. However, they primarilty served in the Waffen-SS, often in field signal units attached to divisions.

=== Ranks ===
The ranks of the Allgemeine SS and the Waffen-SS were based upon those of the SA and used the same titles. However, there was a distinctly separate hierarchical subdivision of the larger Waffen-SS from its general-SS counterpart and an SS member could in fact hold two separate SS ranks. For instance, in 1940 Hermann Fegelein held the Allgemeine SS rank of a Standartenführer (full colonel), yet was only ranked an Obersturmbannführer (lieutenant colonel) in the Waffen-SS. If this same SS member were an architectural engineer, then the SS-Hauptamt would issue a third rank of SS-Sonderführer.

SS members could also hold reserve commissions in the regular military as well as a Nazi Party political rank. Add to this that many senior SS members were also employees of the Reich government in capacities as ministers, deputies, etc. In 1944, nearly every SS general was granted equivalent Waffen-SS rank, without regard to previous military service. This was ordered so to give SS-generals authority over military units and POW camps and apparently to try to provide potential protection under the Hague Convention rules of warfare. In the event of capture by the Allies, SS-Generals thereby hoped they would be given status as military prisoners rather than captured police officials.

== Social background of SS-Officers ==
Social background of SS-Officers in 1938
Social background	SS-Branch		
Social class when entering the SS-Officer Corps	SS-Totenkopfverbände	SS-Verfügungstruppe	Allgemeine SS
Lower Class (Note: Unskilled workers, skilled workers, military junior enlisted.)	26%	22%	27%
Lower Middle Class (Note: Independent craftsmen, farmers, small businessmen, salaried employees, civil servants, military non-commissioned officers, nonacademic professionals)	41%	42%	43%
Upper Middle Class (Note: Managers, higher civil servants, professionals, university students, entrepreneurs, military officers)	33%	36%	31%

== Total manpower ==
In 1944, the stated membership estimate for the SS was 800,000. The Waffen-SS had approximately 600,000 of those members in their ranks. The Waffen-SS had grown from three regiments to over 38 divisions during World War II, and served alongside the Heer (regular army), but never formally a part of it. In comparison, by the end of the war the Allgemeine SS only had a little over 40,000 men still in its ranks.

=== Order of battle ===
The mustering formations of part-time SS members, considered before 1938 to be the core of the Allgemeine SS, were maintained in their own order of battle, beginning with regiment sized Standarten units and extending upwards to division strength Oberabschnitte commands. Within the Allgemeine SS Standarten there were in turn subordinate battalions of Sturmbann themselves divided into company Sturme.

For most rank and file members of the Allgemeine SS, the Sturm level was the highest which the ordinary SS member would typically associate with. The Sturm itself was further divided into platoon sized Truppen (sometimes known as Zug) which were in turn divided into squad sized Scharen. For larger Allgemeine SS commands, the Scharen would be further divided into Rotte which were the Allgemeine SS equivalent of a fire team.

Himmler had grand visions for the SS and authorized SS and Police Bases (SS- und Polizeistützpunkte) to be established in occupied Poland and occupied areas of the Soviet Union. They were to be "armed industrialized agricultural complexes". They would also maintain order in the areas they were established. They did not go beyond the planning stage.

== See also ==
- Glossary of Nazi Germany
- List of Nazi Party leaders and officials
- List of SS personnel
