= Tüßling =

- Municipality
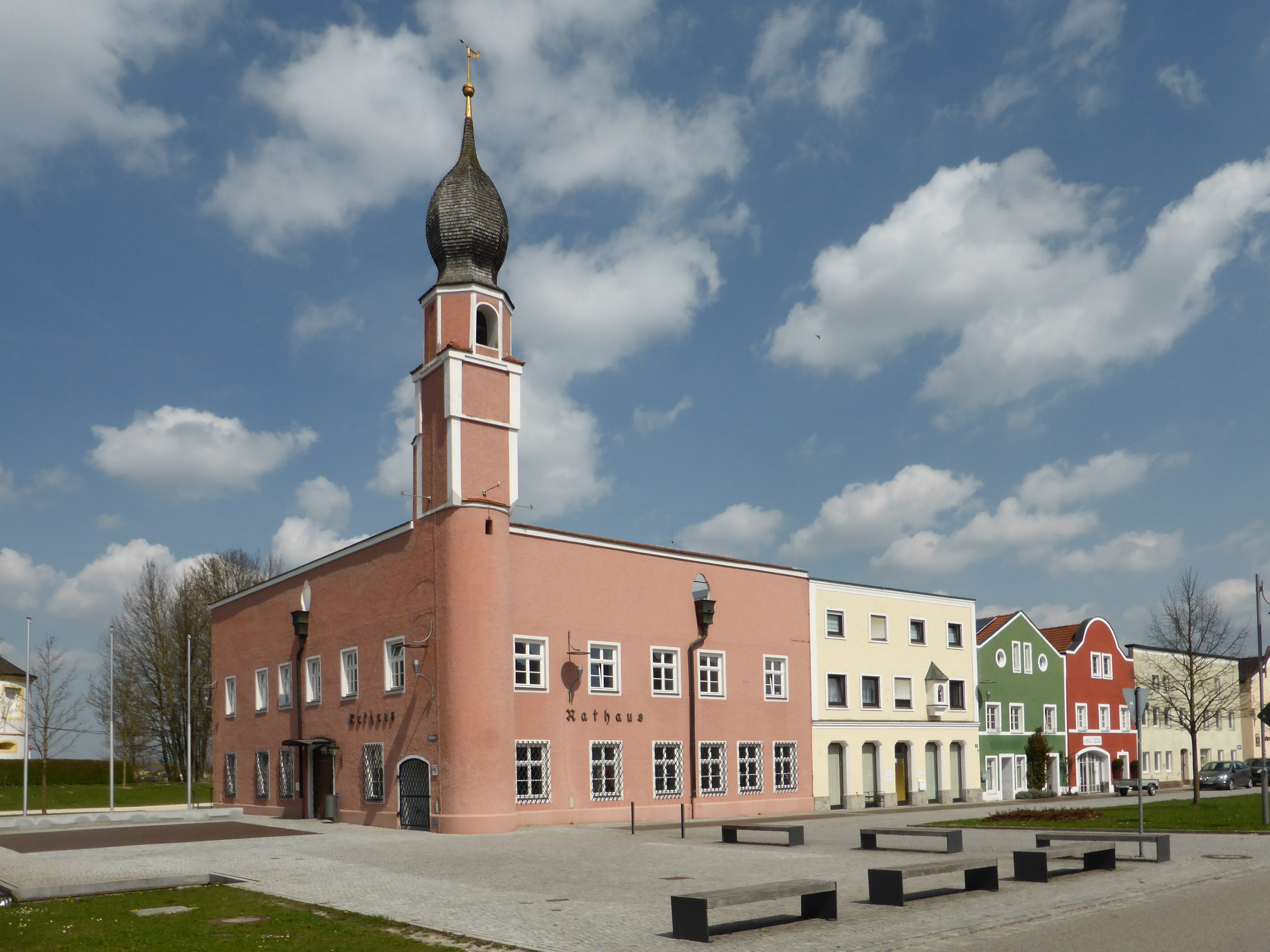
- Town hall

- Coat of arms

- Location of Tüßling within Altötting district
- Interactive map of Tüßling
- Location within Germany Location within Bavaria
- Coordinates: 48°13′N 12°35′E
- Country: Germany
- State: Bavaria
- Admin. region: Oberbayern
- District: Altötting
- Subdivisions: 33 Gemeindeteile

Government
  - Mayor (2024–30): Markus Bauer (FW)

Area
  - Total: 19.55 km^{2} (7.55 sq mi)
- Elevation: 407 m (1,335 ft)

Population (2025-12-31)
  - Total: 3,243
  - Density: 165.9/km^{2} (429.6/sq mi)
- Time zone: UTC+01:00 (CET)
  - Summer (DST): UTC+02:00 (CEST)
- Postal codes: 84577
- Dialling codes: 08633
- Vehicle registration: AÖ
- Website: www.tuessling.de

Tüßling (German pronunciation: [ˈtʏslɪŋ]; Bavarian: Düßling) is a market town in the district of Altötting in Bavaria in Germany.

== People associated with Tüßling ==
- Josef Kammhuber, was a career officer in the Luftwaffe and post-World War II German Air Force, best known as the first general of night fighters in the Luftwaffe during World War II, and the first Inspector of the Air Force of the modern-day German Armed Forces, the Bundeswehr.
- Karl Freiherr Michel von Tüßling, was a Schutzstaffel (SS) officer who served in the Nazi government of German dictator Adolf Hitler, in the staff of the Reichsführer SS and in the staff of the SS Main Office. From 1936 onwards, he was the personal adjutant of Reichsleiter and SS-Obergruppenführer Philipp Bouhler.
