= Schaumburg-Lippe Cross for Loyal Service =

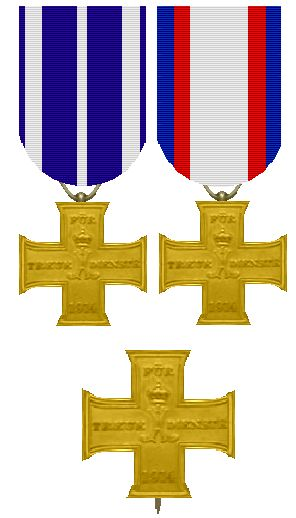
- Insignia of the Cross
- Native name: Kreuz für treue Dienste
- Awarded for: Military Merit, and Valour
- Country: Schaumburg-Lippe
- Combatant's Ribbon

The Cross for Loyal Service was a military award founded on 18 November 1914 by Prince Adolf II. of Schaumburg-Lippe as a recreation of an earlier award created by Adolf I during the Franco-Prussian War. It could be awarded to officers, men, and non-combatants.

== Award Classes ==
Although the Order statutes only mentioned one class (a chest medal). However, another version of the award was also awarded to members of the House of Schaumburg-Lippe and other ruling families. This class was awarded as a pinback cross, similar to the Iron Cross 1st Class, which was worn as a breast star. However, this was legally the same award as the cross for non-royals.

== Appearance ==
The insignia is a bronze Greek Cross, the ends of the arms of the cross have slightly splayed out, and the cross has a raised edge. On the obverse in the arms of the cross is the legend "FÜR TREUE DIENSTE 1914" meaning: "For Loyal Service 1914". In the centre of the Cross is the founder's monogram, an ornamented letter A, surmounted with a crown. The obverse of the cross, by contrast, is bare.

== Wearing ==
The order could be awarded to both combatants and non-combatants. The ribbon for combatants was blue with three white stripes, while the ribbon for non-combatants was white with red and blue edge stripes (the colours of Schaumburg-Lippe).

== Recipients ==
- Wilhelm von Apell
- Curt Badinski
- Ludwig Beck
- Werner von Blomberg
- Maximilian von Herff
- Joachim von Kortzfleisch
- Erich von Manstein
- Georg Alexander von Müller
- Manfred von Richthofen
- Johannes Severin
- Fritz Schlieper

== See also ==
- Lippe War Merit Cross
