= Hermann Senkowsky =

– General Government – Finance Minister Finance President Director of the Monopolies Head of the Department of Finance
- In office 25 January 1942 – January 1945

Personal details
- Born: Hermann Robert Josef Senkowsky; 31 July 1897 Scheibbs, Lower Austria, Austria-Hungary
- Died: 5 April 1965 (aged 67) Innsbruck, Austria
- Party: National Socialist German Workers' Party (NSDAP)

Hermann Robert Josef Senkowsky (31 July 1897 – 5 April 1965) was an Austrian customs officer and SS-Führer. He also was chief president finance of the General Government, which would correlate to finance minister of occupied Poland in World War II. He is also known in Austria for his 1928 customs instructions for Austria, which are, in a modified version, still in use today.

== Life ==
Senkowsky was born on 31 July 1897 in Scheibbs. He went to school in St. Pölten, where he finished secondary school in 1915. He then joined the armed forces of Austria-Hungary as a volunteer in the k.u.k. Feldkanonen-Regiment 5, Brno. He was transferred to the front in Volhynia. He reached the rank of Oberleutnant and was an artillery battery commander at the end of World War I.

From 1919 to 1922 he studied jurisprudence in Innsbruck and Vienna. During this time he joined the Greater German People's Party. After his doctorate in 1922 he became a civil servant in the finance administration and in 1928 published his Zollwachvorschrift, customs instructions for Austria, which are, in a modified version, still in use today. In January 1930 he was promoted to Ministerialsekretär.

Senkowsky was a member of the NSDAP (#1,089,376) since 20 May 1932 and member of the SS (#310,369) since November 9, 1934. He was relieved of his office in 1934 for his membership in the NSDAP, which was an illegal party in Austria at the time. In November 1934 he was arrested for participating in the July Putsch, but was released due to lack of evidence. In May 1935 he was arrested for being a member of the NSDAP and was kept in jail until March 1936. Shortly after his release he fled to Nazi Germany since he was supposed to be re-arrested for his activities as a Nazi.

In May 1936 he became a German citizen and worked for the finance ministry under SS-Gruppenführer Wilhelm Keppler. After the Anschluss he was president finance (customs) in Upper Austria, chief president finance in Linz and Vienna.

After the occupation of Poland he was transferred to the General Government, where he was president finance and director of the monopolies, until he became SS-Oberführer and chief president finance in January 1942, which correlates to finance minister of occupied Poland.

After the end of World War II, Senkowsky was arrested by allied forces. He was released in 1947, because Poland did not ask for his extradition as a war criminal. After that he lived and worked in Innsbruck where he was in charge of the Tyrolean Foreign-Trade Zone.

== Awards and decorations ==
Senkowsky's SS-Ranks
Datum	Rang
January 1940	SS-Sturmbannführer
November 1940	SS-Obersturmbannführer
April 1941	SS-Standartenführer
November 1944	SS-Oberführer

- Medal for Bravery (Austria-Hungary)
- Military Merit Medal (Austria-Hungary)
- Karl Troop Cross
- SS Zivilabzeichen (#169.582)
- Honour Chevron for the Old Guard
- War Merit Cross I. and II. class
- Honour Cross of the World War
- Sudetenland Medal with Prague Castle Bar
- Bulgarian order for civil merit, knight commander

== Books ==
- Die Dienstpragmatik: Gesetz vom 25.1. 1914, RGBl. Nr. 15, unter Berücksichtigung der bis 1.12. 1928 eingetretenen Veränderungen mit den Durchführungsvorschriften, Herausgeber Hermann Senkowsky, Verlag Manz, 1929
- Die österreichische Zollwachvorschrift samt den einschlägigen Gesetzen, Verordnungen und Erlässen, Author Hermann Senkowsky, Verlag Manz, 1928

== Literature ==
- Höchste Nazi-Beamte im General-Gouvernement in Polen in den Kriegsjahren 1939-45, von Towiah Friedman, Verlag Institute of Documentation in Israel, 2002.
- Ernst Klee: Das Personenlexikon zum Dritten Reich. Fischer, Frankfurt am Main 2007. ISBN 978-3-596-16048-8. (Aktualisierte 2. Auflage)
- Werner Präg / Wolfgang Jacobmeyer (Hrsg.): Das Diensttagebuch des deutschen Generalgouverneurs in Polen 1939–1945. Veröffentlichungen des Instituts für Zeitgeschichte, Quellen und Darstellungen zur Zeitgeschichte Band 20, Stuttgart 1975, ISBN 3-421-01700-X.
