= Hans Jüttner =

German Nazi, head of the SS Leadership Main Office, SS-Obergruppenführer (1894–1965)

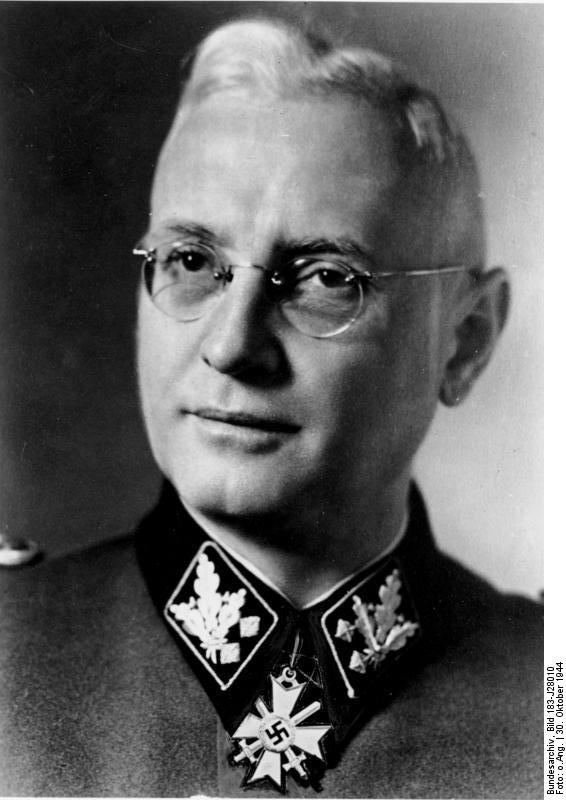
- Born: 2 March 1894; Schmiegel, Province of Posen, Kingdom of Prussia, German Empire
- Died: 24 May 1965 (aged 71); Bad Tölz, Bavaria, West Germany
- Military career
- Allegiance: German Empire; Weimar Republic; Nazi Germany
- Branch: Schutzstaffel; Waffen-SS
- Service years: 1933–1945
- Rank: SS-Obergruppenführer and General of the Waffen-SS
- Commands: SS Leadership Main Office
- Awards: Knights Cross of the War Merit Cross, with Swords

Hans Jüttner (2 March 1894 – 24 May 1965) was a German high-ranking functionary in the Schutzstaffel (SS) of Nazi Germany who served as the head of the SS Führungshauptamt (FHA; SS Leadership Main Office).

== Career in the Nazi Party and the SS ==
He served as an infantry officer during World War I. Thereafter, Jüttner became a member of the Nazi Party in 1931. Jüttner joined the Sturmabteilung (SA) in 1933. In 1934, Jüttner became chief of the SA Reichsführerschule (training body for SA leaders) in Munich. In 1935 he joined the Schutzstaffel (SS). He then transferred to the SS combat support force (SS-Verfügungstruppe or SS-VT), which subsequently became the Waffen-SS. By 1939, Jüttner had become the Inspector of Reserve Troops of the SS-VT-Division under Paul Hausser. From early 1940, Jüttner led the SS-VT command office.

In August 1940, the SS Leadership Main Office (SS-Führungshauptamt; FHA) was created by SS chief Heinrich Himmler. Although nominally under the authority of Himmler, its operational command was under Jüttner. The FHA was responsible for the Waffen-SS organizational, administrative leadership and control. This was separate from the administration of Nazi concentration camps, the SS Economic and Administrative Main Office (SS-Wirtschafts-Verwaltungshauptamt), and from the Reich Security Main Office, which administered the Gestapo, Kripo and SD. Shortly after taking office, Jüttner was instrumental in wresting control of the militarized Death's Head regiments (Totenkopfstandarten) from Concentration Camps Inspectorate chief Theodor Eicke and amalgamating them into the Waffen-SS. In June 1943, he was promoted to SS-Obergruppenführer. On 30 January 1943, Jüttner became chief of the FHA. On 21 July 1944, after Himmler had been placed in charge of the Replacement Army following the failed coup on 20 July 1944, Himmler appointed Jüttner Chief of "Army Armament and Commander of the Reserve Army". Jüttner was later awarded the Knights Cross of the War Merit Cross, with Swords.

== Trial and conviction ==
On 17 May 1945, Jüttner was taken prisoner by British forces. In 1948, he was sentenced to ten years in a labour camp by a denazification court. In appeal proceedings in 1949, his punishment was lowered to four years. Rezső Kasztner testified that Jüttner had taken pity on a group of Hungarian Jews after witnessing a death march, resulting in 7,500 Jews being sent back to Budapest. It was later found that the death march had been called off since the roads were blocked off by retreating German soldiers.

In 1961, Jüttner testified for the prosecution in the trial of Holocaust architect Adolf Eichmann. Later Jüttner was the proprietor of a sanatorium in Bad Tölz, where he died in 1965.

Jüttner was a member of HIAG.
