= SS Zivilabzeichen =

Badge worn by SS members on the lapel of civilian clothing

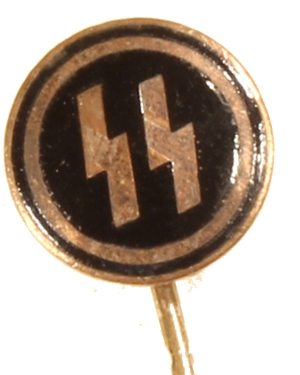
SS Zivilabzeichen of Hermann Senkowsky

The SS Zivilabzeichen (-Z.A.) was a badge of the SS issued between the years of 1933 and 1938 to SS members.

Translated as "SS Civil Badge", the SS Zivilabzeichen was a small lapel pin worn on civilian clothing to denote membership in the SS. The badge was most commonly awarded to members of the Sicherheitspolizei who were veteran SS members. There appears to have been no set criteria for the SS-Z.A.'s issuance, and an SS member had only to apply to the SS-Hauptamt in order to receive the civil badge.

== Known civil badge numbers ==
Adolf Hitler was given honorary SS number "1" and was awarded a Zivilabzeichen by the SS. The badge was stored in Hitler's Munich apartment until it was taken by 1st LT Philip Ben Lieber in 1945. The badge, along with a group of material owned by Hitler, was sold through Mohawk Arms to collectors Stephen Wolfe and Neil Hardin. In 2013, the entire group was purchased by military antique collector and dealer Craig Gottlieb.

- #1: Adolf Hitler
- #2: Heinrich Himmler
- #6,375: Adolf Eichmann
- #72,723: Gustav Lombard
- #106,983: Karl Freiherr Michel von Tüßling
- #160,180: Ernst Kaltenbrunner
- #169,582: Hermann Senkowsky

== Sources ==
- SS service record of Adolf Eichmann, National Archives and Records Administration, College Park, Maryland
