= SS Führungshauptamt =

Operational headquarters of the SS of Nazi Germany (1940–1945)

SS-FHA
- SS Führungshauptamt
- The SS-FHA was the operations office of the Waffen-SS and Allgemeine SS.

Agency overview
- Formed: 1940
- Preceding agency: SS-Hauptamt
- Dissolved: 8 May 1945
- Jurisdiction: Germany
- Headquarters: Prinz-Albrecht-Straße, Berlin
- Employees: ~4,000 (c. 1941); 450 (1944)
- Agency executives: Heinrich Himmler (1940–1943); Hans Jüttner (1943–1945)
- Parent agency: SS
- Child agencies: Allgemeine SS from c. 1940; Waffen-SS from c. 1940

The SS Führungshauptamt (English: SS Leadership Main Office or SS Management Head Office) (SS-FHA) was the operational headquarters of the Schutzstaffel (SS) from 1940 until 1945, during the Nazi era in Germany.

The office's tasks included the administration of the SS-Junker Schools, of medical services, of logistics, and of rates of pay. It was also the administrative and operational headquarters for the Waffen-SS, responsible for its organisation and equipment and for the order of battle of SS combat units.

== Formation ==
The SS Führungshauptamt, which was under the command of Heinrich Himmler, the head of the Schutzstaffel (SS), was formed in August 1940 from certain departments of the SS Main Office (SS-Hauptamt or SS-HA) and the Allgemeine SS (General SS). Its main duty was the operational and administrative control of the Waffen-SS, including developing general policy on recruiting and handling special personnel requirements. It also oversaw the Kommandoamt der Allgemeine SS (General SS HQ) and Kommandoamt der Waffen SS (Waffen-SS HQ). When Himmler stepped down as SS-FHA chief in 1943, Hans Jüttner took over as chief of the department till the end of the war in Europe.

Recruiting members for the Waffen-SS was handled through the SS Main Office and its chief, Gottlob Berger. This caused overlapping jurisdiction and friction between the two SS branches. Berger's command had a problematic relationship with the SS-FHA, which was responsible for organising, training and equipping the Waffen-SS. Jüttner's initial efforts at integrating the recruits from western Europe and Scandinavia were inadequate with insufficient emphasis on training and appointing officers and non-commissioned officers from the ranks of the new recruits. The SS-FHA also wanted the Waffen-SS to be a small elite corps, but Berger and Himmler knew that Adolf Hitler needed as many divisions as possible, even if that meant some Waffen-SS formations would be of lesser quality. During the war years, to meet the high casualty rates and expansion needs of the Waffen-SS, members of the Allgemeine SS and other personnel working for SS organisations were used for compulsory recruitment drives by the SS Main Office to meet the manpower needs of the Waffen-SS.

== Organisation ==
Departmental Group A (Amtsgruppe A) Organisation, Personnel and Supply (Organisation, Personal, Versorgung)

- Amt I – Command Department of the Allgemeine SS (Kommandoamt der Allgemeinen-SS)
- Amt II – Command Department of the Waffen-SS (Kommandoamt der Waffen-SS)
- Amt III – Central Chancellery (Zentralkanzlei)
- Amt IV – Administration Department (Verwaltungsamt)
- Amt V – Personnel Department (Personalamt)
- Amt VI – Office for (Horse) Rider and Driver Training (Reit- und Fahrwesen)
- Amt VII – Office for Logistics Planning (Nachschubwesen)
- Amt VIII – Weapons Department (Waffenamt)
- Amt IX – Department for Technical and Mechanical Development (Technische Ausrüstung und Maschinen)
- Amt X – Motor Vehicle Administration (Kraftfahrzeugwesen)

Departmental Group B (Amtsgruppe B) Training (Ausbildung)

- Amt XI – Officer Training (Führer-Ausbildung) and SS-Officer Cadet Schools (mit SS-Junkerschulen)
- Amt XII – NCO Training (Unterführer-Ausbildung) and SS-NCO Training Schools (mit SS-Unterführerschulen)

Departmental Group C (Amtsgruppe C) Inspection (Inspektionen)

- Insp. 2 Infantry and Mountain Troops (Infanterie- und Gebirgstruppen)
- Insp. 3 Cavalry (Kavallerie)
- Insp. 4 Artillery (Artillerie)
- Insp. 5 Engineers / Technicians (Pioniere/Techniker)
- Insp. 6 Panzer troops (Panzertruppen)
- Insp. 7 Signals Troops (Nachrichtentruppen)
- Insp. 8 Field Maintenance Troops (Feldzeug- und Instandsetzungstruppen)
- Insp. 9 Service Support Troops (Versorgungstruppen)
- Insp. 10 Motor Pool Troops (Kraftfahrparktruppen)
- Insp. 11 Unknown
- Insp. 12 Technical Training (Technische Lehrgänge)
- Insp. 13 Anti-Air Artillery (Flakartillerie)

Departmental Group D (Amtsgruppe D) Medical Arm of the Waffen-SS (Sanitätswesen der Waffen-SS)

- Amt XIII – Administration (Verwaltung)
- Amt XIV – Dental (Zahnwesen)
- Amt XV – Supply (Versorgung)
- Amt XVI – Medical Treatment (Ärztliche Behandlung)

== Bibliography ==
- McNab, Chris (2009). The SS: 1923–1945. London: Amber Books. ISBN 978-1-906626-49-5.
- Weale, Adrian (2012). Army of Evil: A History of the SS. New York: Caliber Printing. ISBN 978-0-451-23791-0.
- Wegner, Bernd (1990). The Waffen-SS: Organization, Ideology and Function. Blackwell. ISBN 0-631-14073-5.
