= SS Personnel Main Office =

The SS Personnel Main Office (German: SS Personalhauptamt) was established on 1 June 1939 from the personnel department in Himmler's personal staff. It was responsible for the administration of personnel matters regarding all leaders and officers of the Schutzstaffel (SS) of Nazi Germany. This included the Allgemeine SS (General SS), Waffen-SS and Sicherheitsdienst (SD; Security Service), specifically those matters regarding admission, promotion and dismissal, but also organisational matters, transfers, and training. It was responsible for processing recommendations for decorations. The office was also responsible for the SS seniority list (Dienstaltersliste), the granting of the SS-Ehrenring (SS Honour Ring) and Degen (SS Honour Sword), and also appointed members within the Allgemeine SS. Walter Schmitt was chief of the office until June 1942 when, due to illness, he turned over responsibility for management of the office to Maximilian von Herff who formally succeeded him on 1 October 1942, remaining in charge until the fall of the Nazi regime. The office was supervised closely by Heinrich Himmler, head of the SS.

== Organization ==
The office consisted of two main departments:

- Officer Personnel
- Officer Replacements
