= SS Education Office =

Nazi organization

The SS Education Office (SS-Schulungsamt) was one of the Nazi organizations responsible for the ideological indoctrination of SS members. The office operated initially under the jurisdiction of the Reich Race and Settlement Office (RuSHA) but was later subordinated to the SS Main Office (SS-Hauptamt).

== History ==
When the RuSHA was established on 30 January 1935, it assumed four principal areas of responsibility, the first of which was the ideological training for members of the SS. To facilitate that task, the SS Education Office was formed. This office went on to disseminate pernicious, pseudo-scientific instructional material about Jews, Communist, the racial characteristics of various peoples, and other Nazi propaganda. Cadets were inculcated with a curriculum that stressed the fundamental tenets of National Socialism, which included the dangers of Judaism, Bolshevism, Christianity, Western liberalism, and the imminent Germanic struggle for mastery over Europe. There were three sub-components of the SS Education Office, each responsible for the corresponding duties:

- Decrees, Orders and Announcements of the RuSHA-SS Training Office (Erlasse, Anordnungen und Mitteilungen des RuSHA-SS, Schulungsamt)
- Ideological Training: Operating Procedures and Guidelines (Weltanschauliche Schulung - Dienstanweisungen, Richtlinien)
- Training Booklets and Seasonal Celebrations (Schulungshefte und Jahreszeitenfeiern)

Indoctrination courses offered through the SS Education Office were not particularly popular and SS Commanders sometimes placed drinking beer with the Wehrmacht ahead of attending such training. Head of the SS Education Office, SS-Standartenführer Dr. Cäsar, lodged complaints about racial policy instructions having minimal impact on the men of the SS, that they were noticeably "bored" and that the training over fundamental National Socialist ideology was not meetings requirements.

In 1936, Heinrich Himmler transferred the training of the SS military troops, SS-Verfügungstruppe (SS dispositional troops or SS-VT) away from the SS Education Office to the unit commanders. In August 1938, Himmler also transferred indoctrination training away from the RuSHA and placed it under the jurisdiction of the SS-Hauptamt. Training was thereafter intensified as Himmler wanted members of the SS to not just know about Nazi doctrine, he intended for them "to live it."

Not only did the SS Education Office provide fundamental ideological training, the organization also conducted studies related to Nazi endeavors. Their historical research over the Nazi expansion into Eastern Europe for instance, came to the conclusion that former racial intermingling by Germanic predecessors had weakened German blood while it simultaneously became a "cultural fertilizer for foreign peoples". Studies like this reinforced Himmler's conviction to prevent what he determined were "mistakes" of the past.

One of the most revealing booklets published and distributed by this sub-section of the SS-Hauptamt was the Lehrplan für die weltanschauliche Erziehung in der SS und Polizei (Worldview Training Curriculum for the SS and Police), a training manual which contained thirty-four lessons on a wide array of topics like the organizational structure and history of the SS, the history of Europe and Germany, the importance of Hitler, and the centrality of biology, evolution, heredity, and race to the Nazi worldview. Another notable publication from the SS-Schulungsamt was the pamphlet entitled, Der Untermensch (the sub-human) which contrasted images of idealized Nordic persons against Slavic people and Jews who looked entirely different from them.

It was the SS Education Office which conceived and drafted the ideological training for the SS and the various police organs of the Nazi state. In harmony with the beliefs of Hitler and his inner circle, institutions like the SS Education office promulgated the most extreme aspects of Nazi doctrine which ultimately contributed to the loss of many millions of lives. Most victims were Jews but people of Slavic extraction, Romani peoples, and "identified enemies" of the Nazi regime like Communists, homosexuals, physically and mentally disabled people, and political opponents (religious, political, social, and otherwise) were murdered as well. As a result of their training and beliefs, the SS unleashed unprecedented terror upon the people of Europe who did not fit into their compartmentalized world and committed unspeakable acts of cruelty in perpetrating the Holocaust.

== See also ==
- SS-Junker Schools
- National Political Institutes of Education
