= Maximilian von Herff =

German SS-Obergruppenführer in the Waffen-SS (1893–1945)

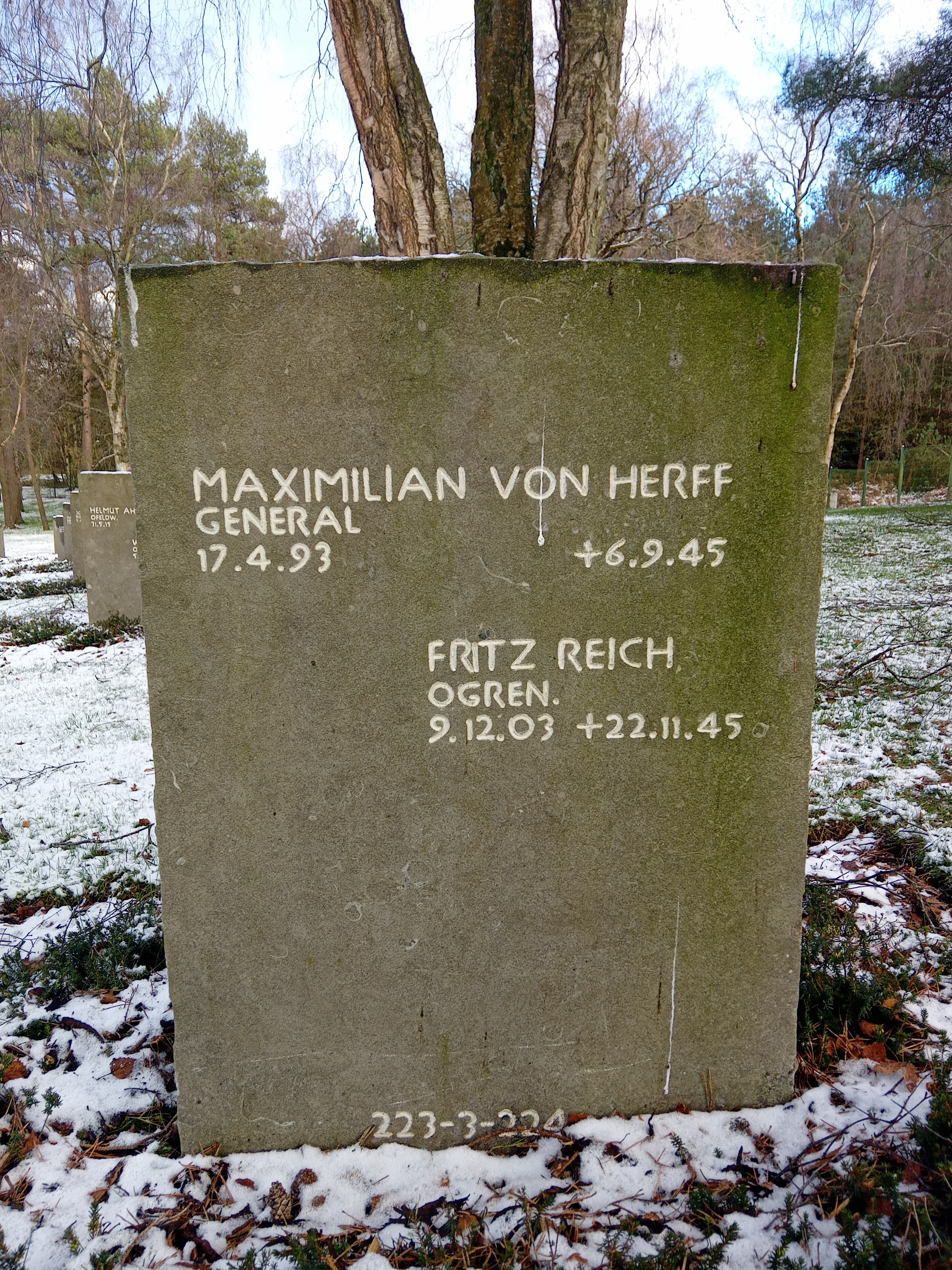
- Herff's grave in Cannock Chase German war cemetery
- Born: 17 April 1893; Hanover, Kingdom of Prussia, German Empire
- Died: 6 September 1945 (aged 52); Ulverston, England, United Kingdom
- Burial place: Cannock Chase German war cemetery
- Relatives: Eberhard Herf (cousin)
- Military career
- Allegiance: German Empire; Weimar Republic; Nazi Germany
- Branch: Royal Prussian Army; Freikorps; Reichswehr; German Army; Schutzstaffel; Waffen-SS
- Service years: 1914–1945
- Rank: SS-Obergruppenführer und General der Waffen-SS
- Commands: SS Personnel Main Office
- Conflicts: World War I; German Revolution of 1918–19; World War II; North African Campaign
- Awards: Knight's Cross of the Iron Cross

Maximilian Karl Otto von Herff (17 April 1893 – 6 September 1945) was a German career military officer who became a senior SS official during the Nazi era. Rising to the rank of SS-Obergruppenführer, he served as head of the SS Personnel Main Office from 1942 to 1945. He was taken prisoner at the end of World War II and died while in British military custody.

== Early life ==
Maximilian von Herff was born in Hanover on 17 April 1893, the son of a general practitioner. The Protestant von Herff family originated from Herve in Belgium and moved to the Palatinate in 1577 to escape religious persecution. His ancestor, Christian Herff, had been inducted into the nobility in 1814.

On the outbreak of World War I, Herff joined the Royal Prussian Army's 115th (1st Grand Ducal Hessian) Lifeguard Infantry Regiment in Darmstadt. He was later transferred to the 154th (5th Lower Silesian) Infantry Regiment. He was promoted to Leutnant on 11 February 1915 and to Oberleutnant on 18 October 1918, remaining in the unit until 9 November 1918. After the war, Herff fought with a Freikorps unit in Hanover between March and October 1919 before transferring into the post-war Reichswehr. In 1926, he was assigned to the 18th Cavalry Regiment in Stuttgart, and in February 1928, to the 15th Infantry Regiment in Kassel. He was promoted to Hauptmann on 1 February 1928, and to Major on 1 October 1934. In the Wehrmacht he was promoted to Oberstleutnant on 1 August 1937, and transferred to the staff of the XVII Army Corps in Vienna as an adjutant on 3 January 1939.

== World War II ==
During World War II, Herff served with the Deutsches Afrika Korps in North Africa. He was promoted to Oberst and commanded "Kampfgruppe von Herff". For his service in North Africa, he was awarded the Knight's Cross of the Iron Cross in June 1941.

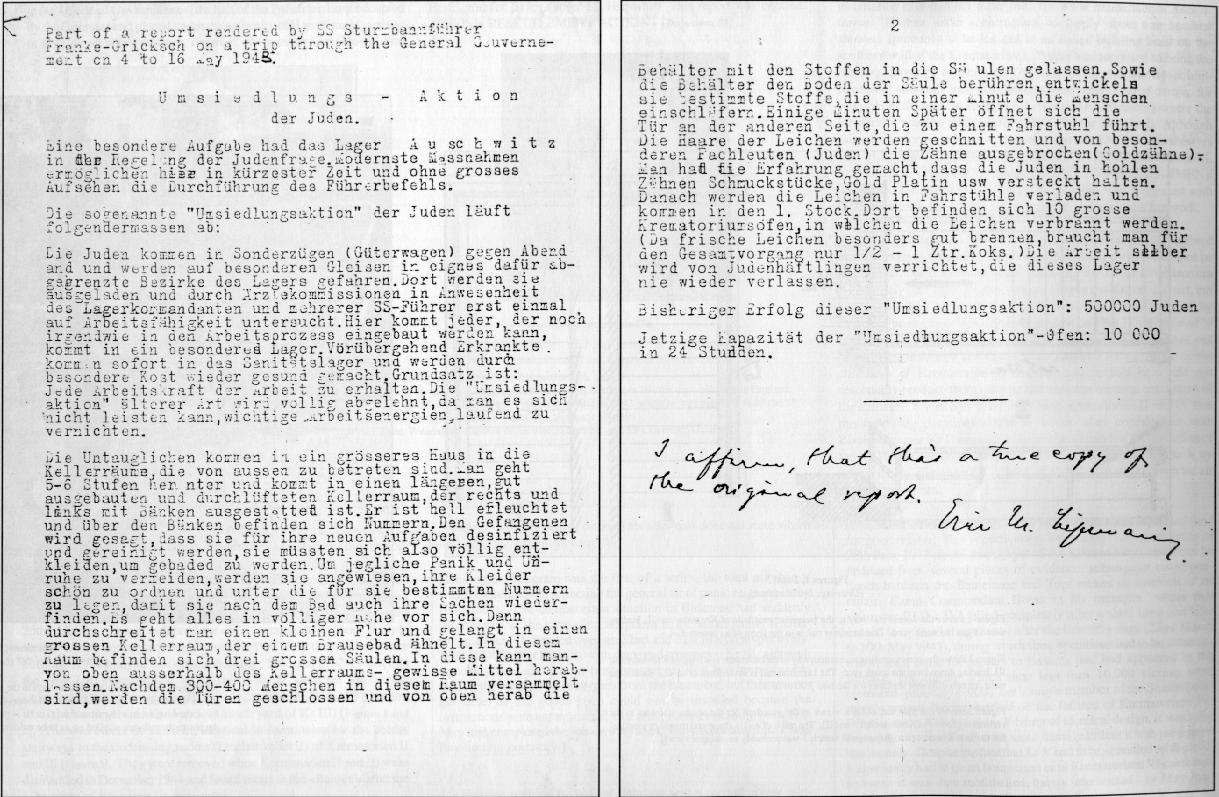
Part of a report rendered by SS-Sturmbannführer Alfred Franke-Gricksch on a trip through the General Government on 4 to 16 May 1943. Excerpt by Eric M. Lipman, War Crime Branch Officer, Third U.S. Army

At the suggestion of Heinrich Himmler, Herff transferred to the Waffen-SS. On 1 April 1942, he joined the Nazi Party (member no. 8,858,661) and the SS (member no. 405,894). From 1 October 1942 to 8 May 1945, he was chief of the SS Personnel Main Office where he dealt with internal and financial SS matters. On 20 April 1944, Herff was promoted to SS-Obergruppenführer.

== Capture and death ==
Herff was taken prisoner by British forces after Germany's surrender in May 1945, and held at Grizedale Hall POW camp. He suffered a stroke and died at nearby Conishead Priory Military Hospital. He was later reburied at Cannock Chase German Military Cemetery, Staffordshire.

== Family ==
Herff's sister, Carin von Herff, moved to London during his imprisonment where she lived for four years before returning to Germany with her French Huguenot husband, a former SS-Oberführer of the 33rd Waffen Grenadier Division of the SS Charlemagne (1st French). Both were acquitted of any war crimes and, along with Maximilian von Herff, claimed they were only involved in the Nazi Party and the Waffen-SS not the extermination of the Jews. The couple later returned to live in England in the 1960s.

Herff's cousin was Eberhard Herf, a senior SS police official. He commanded Police Regiment North and Order Police units in Minsk, Belarus and directed mass murder of the Jews in the Minsk Ghetto. Following the war, Eberhard Herf was convicted in the Minsk Trial and executed.

== Awards and decorations ==
- Knight's Cross of the House Order of Hohenzollern with swords
- Iron Cross (1914) 2nd and 1st class
- Wound Badge (1918) in black
- General Honor Decoration of Hesse)
- War Honor Decoration in Iron of Hesse
- Schaumburg-Lippe Cross for Loyal Service
- Honour Cross of the World War 1914/1918
- Clasp to the Iron Cross 2nd and 1st class
- Wound Badge (1939) in silver
- Knight's Cross of the Iron Cross on 13 June 1941 as Oberst and as commander of Kampfgruppe "von Herff" (Schützen-Regiment 115).
