= Personal Staff Reichsführer-SS =

Personal office of Schutzstaffel (SS) leader Heinrich Himmler

- Hauptamt Persönlicher Stab Reichsführer-SS
- Logo of the SS

Agency overview
- Formed: c. 1933
- Dissolved: 8 May 1945
- Jurisdiction: Germany; Occupied Europe
- Headquarters: Prinz-Albrecht-Straße, Berlin; 52°30′26″N 13°22′57″E
- Employees: ~ 120 (c. 1944)
- Minister responsible: Heinrich Himmler, (1933–1945)
- Agency executives: Karl Wolff (1933–1942); Maximilian von Herff (1942–1945)
- Parent agency: Schutzstaffel

The Personal Staff Reichsführer-SS (German: Hauptamt Persönlicher Stab Reichsführer-SS) was a main office of the Schutzstaffel (SS), which was established in 1933 by Heinrich Himmler to serve as a personal office coordinating various activities and projects subordinate to the Reichsführer-SS.

== Operations ==
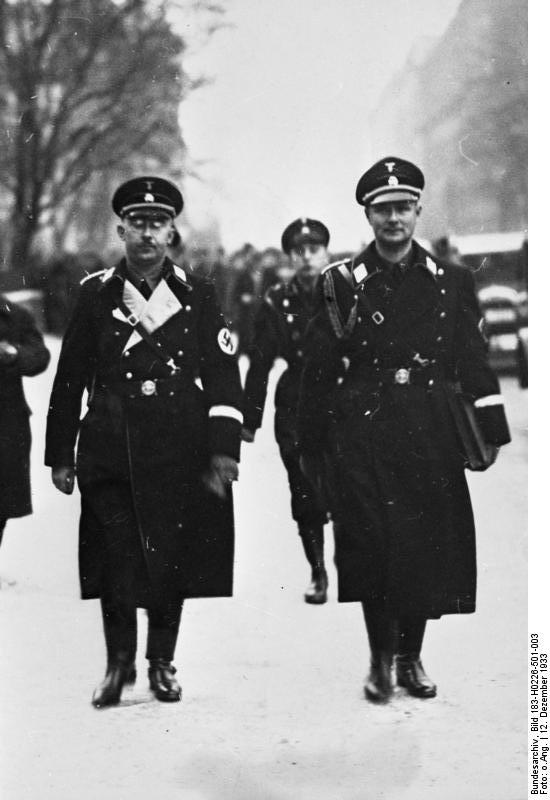
Heinrich Himmler with his adjutant Karl Wolff in 1933.

In 1933, Karl Wolff came to the attention of Himmler who in June 1933, appointed Wolff his adjutant and made him chief of the office of his Personal Staff. Himmler also appointed Wolff the SS Liaison Officer to Hitler. As Himmler's principal adjutant and close associate, Wolff's daily activities involved overseeing Himmler's schedule and serving as a liaison with other SS offices and agencies. The office conveyed the wishes/interests of the Reichsführer to all branches, offices, and subordinated units within the SS. It also handled Himmler's personal correspondence and awarded decorations. Wolff managed Himmler's affairs with the Nazi Party, state agencies and personnel. Following the assassination of Reinhard Heydrich in 1942, Wolff fell out with Himmler and was replaced by Maximilian von Herff who served as its head until the end of the war.

Himmler also established several special project teams under the authority of his personal office. This included the staff of the Wewelsburg castle as well as the Ahnenerbe. This team of experts was interested in the anthropological and cultural history of the Aryan race. It conducted experiments and launched voyages with the intent of proving that prehistoric and mythological Nordic populations had once ruled the world.

== Role in the Holocaust ==
The exact role that Himmler's personal staff played in the Holocaust has been a subject of debate, with Karl Wolff claiming that the personal staff were little more than desk bound paper pushers. However, given that most of Himmler's wishes and orders were distributed by his personal staff, Wolff would have been aware of significant events or could easily have access to the relevant information. Incriminating letters show that Wolff was involved in the Holocaust.

For example, as the liquidation of the Warsaw Ghetto resulted in rail transport bottlenecks, Wolff telephoned deputy Reich Minister of Transport, Albert Ganzenmüller. In a later letter dated 13 August 1942, Wolff thanked Ganzenmüller for his assistance.

I note with particular pleasure from your communication that a train with 5,000 members of the chosen people has been running daily for 14 days and that we are accordingly in a position to continue with this population movement at an accelerated pace. I have taken the initiative to seek out the offices involved, so that a smooth implementation of the named measures appears to be guaranteed. I thank you once again for the effort and at the same time wish to ask you to continue monitoring these things. With best wishes and Heil Hitler, yours sincerely W.

— Karl Wolff to Albert Ganzenmüller, 13 August 1942,

Further, Wolff would have received copies of all letters from SS officers, and his friends at that point included Odilo Globočnik, the organizer of "Operation Reinhard". Therefore, his later denial of knowledge of Holocaust activities may be plausible only at the detailed level of atrocities by the Nazi regime.
