= Allach =

Allach may refer to:

- Allach, a part of Allach-Untermenzing, a north-western borough of Munich
- Allach (porcelain)
- Allach (concentration camp)
