= Hugo Boss (businessman) =

German businessman (1885–1948)

- Born: Hugo Ferdinand Boss; 8 July 1885; Metzingen, Württemberg, German Empire
- Died: 9 August 1948 (aged 63); Metzingen, Württemberg-Hohenzollern, Allied-occupied Germany
- Occupation: Businessman
- Known for: Founding the Hugo Boss clothing company
- Political party: Nazi Party (1931–1945)

Hugo Ferdinand Boss (8 July 1885 – 9 August 1948) was a German businessman who founded the fashion house Hugo Boss. He was an active member of the Nazi Party from 1931, and remained so until Nazi Germany's capitulation. His clothing company also utilized forced labour drawn from German-occupied territories and prisoner-of-war camps to manufacture military uniforms for the Schutzstaffel and Wehrmacht.

== Early life ==
Boss was born in Metzingen, Kingdom of Württemberg, to Luise (née Münzenmayer) and Heinrich Boss, the youngest of five children. He apprenticed as a merchant, did his military service from 1903 to 1905, and then worked in a weaving mill in Konstanz. He took over his parents' lingerie shop in Metzingen in 1908, as heir. In 1914, he was mobilized into the army and served through World War I, ending it as a corporal.

== Hugo Boss company ==
Boss founded his own clothing company in Metzingen in 1923 and then opened a factory in 1924, initially with two partners. The company produced shirts and jackets and later work clothing, sportswear, and raincoats. In the 1930s, it produced uniforms for the SA, the SS, the Hitler Youth, the postal service, the national railway, and later the Wehrmacht.

== Support of Nazism ==
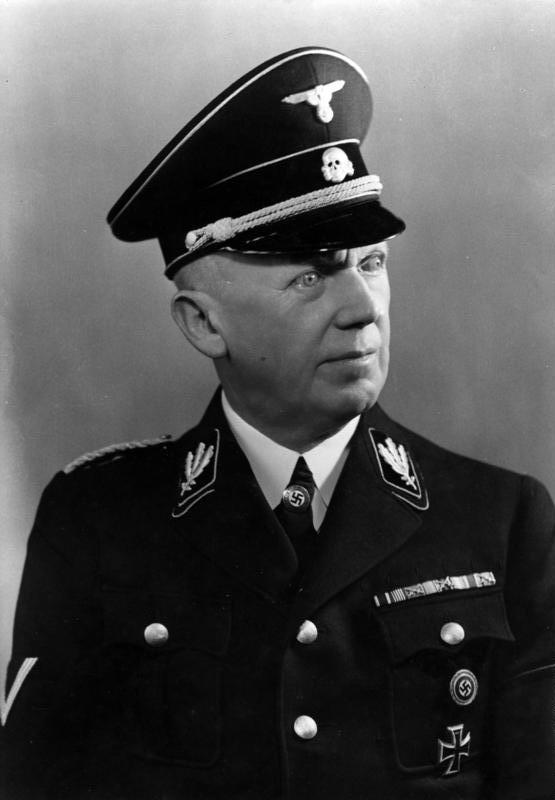
SS-Gruppenführer Hans Lammers in black Allgemeine-SS uniform 1938

Boss joined the Nazi Party in 1931, two years before Adolf Hitler came to power. By the third quarter of 1932, the all-black SS uniform (to replace the SA brown shirts) was designed by SS-Oberführer Prof. Karl Diebitsch, and graphic designer Walter Heck, who had no affiliation with the company. The Hugo Boss company produced these black uniforms along with the brown SA shirts and the black-and-brown uniforms of the Hitler Youth. Some workers were French and Polish prisoners of war forced into labour. In 1999, US lawyers acting on behalf of Holocaust survivors started legal proceedings against the Hugo Boss company over its use of slave labour during the war. The company issued an apology in 2011 for the misuse of 140 Polish and 40 French forced workers.

After World War II, the denazification process saw Boss initially labeled as an "activist, supporter and beneficiary" of Nazism, which resulted in a heavy fine, also stripping him of his voting rights and capacity to run a business. This initial ruling was appealed, and Boss was re-labeled as a Mitläufer ("fellow traveller"), a category with a less severe punishment. Nevertheless, the effects of the ban led to Boss's son-in-law, Eugen Holy, taking over both the ownership and the running of the company.

== Death ==
Boss died on 9 August 1948 of a tooth abscess in Württemberg-Hohenzollern, Allied-occupied Germany. He was 63 years old at the time of his death.
