= Hugo Boss =

German fashion company

Hugo Boss AG

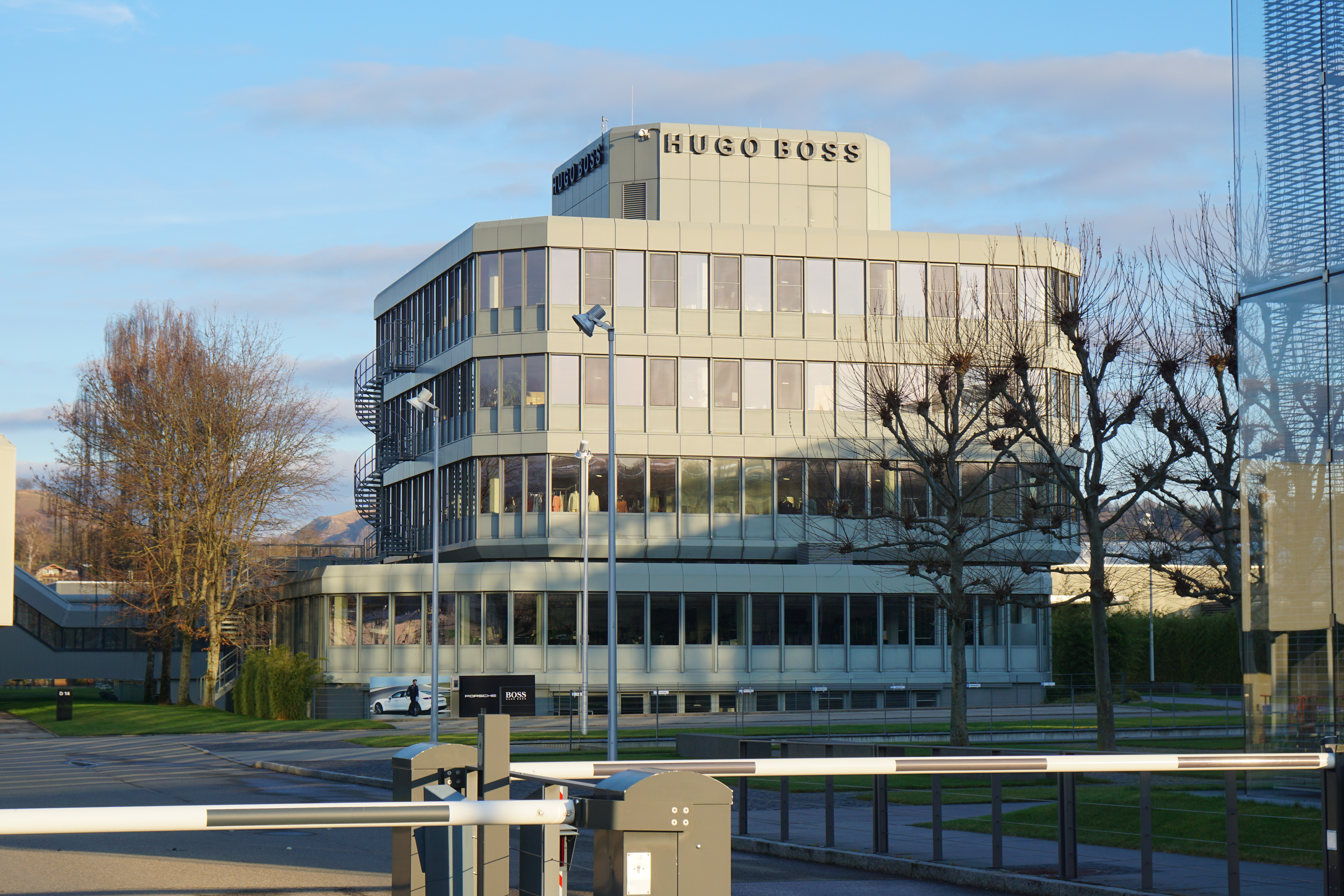
- Headquarters in Metzingen, Germany
- Type: Public (Aktiengesellschaft)
- Traded as: FWB: BOSS; MDAX Component
- Industry: Clothing; Accessories
- Founded: 1924; 102 years ago
- Founder: Hugo Ferdinand Boss
- Headquarters: Metzingen, Germany
- Key people: Daniel Grieder (CEO); Yves Müller (CFO/COO); Oliver Timm (CSO); Michael Murray (Chairman of the Supervisory Board)
- Products: High-fashion; Accessories; Footwear
- Revenue: €4.3 billion (2025)
- Operating income: €391 million (2025)
- Net income: €259 million (2025)
- Total assets: €3.721 billion (2025)
- Total equity: €1.558 billion (2025)
- Owners: Frasers Group (50.08%); Free Float (35.92%); Marzotto family (14%)
- Number of employees: 17,527 (2025)
- Parent: Frasers Group (Note: Despite owning more than half of the retailer, the company serves as a subsidiary of the group.)
- Website: hugoboss.com

Hugo Boss AG (stylized in all caps) is a German designer fashion company headquartered in Metzingen, Baden-Württemberg, Germany. The company sells clothing, accessories, footwear, and leather goods. Hugo Boss is one of the largest German clothing brands, with global sales of about €4.3 billion in 2025. Its stock is a component of the MDAX. Since October 2026, the company has been a majority-owned subsidiary of the British Frasers Group. Its fashion brands are Boss and Hugo. Hugo Boss also sells licensed brand products for children's fashion, eyewear, watches, home textiles, riding apparel, writing utensils and fragrances.

The company was founded in 1924 in Germany by Hugo Boss and originally produced general-purpose clothing. In the early 1930s, Hugo Boss began to produce and supply military uniforms for the government of Nazi Germany, resulting in a large boost in sales. After World War II and the founder's death in 1948, Hugo Boss started to turn its focus to men's suits. The company introduced a fragrance line in 1984 and went public in 1985, adding a men's wear diffusion line in 1993, women's wear in 1998, a full women's collection in 2000, and children's clothing in 2006–2007. The company has since evolved into a major global fashion house. As of December 2025, it operated 1,462 own retail points of sale worldwide.

== History ==
=== Early years ===
After the end of the First World War, Hugo Ferdinand Boss (1885–1948) took over his parents' clothing retail business in Metzingen, where it still operates, and registered it as a business for manufactured goods in 1922. In 1924, he started a factory for the production of workwear along with two partners, Albert and Theodor Bräuchle, as shareholders. The company produced shirts, jackets, work clothing, sportswear, and raincoats. In 1925 and 1926, Hugo Boss, like all Metzingen companies, announced Kurzarbeit for its almost 30 employees. In connection with the global economic crisis following the New York stock market crash of 1929, the company had to reduce its workforce by almost a quarter and file for bankruptcy in 1931. In the same year, Hugo Ferdinand Boss reached an agreement with his creditors, leaving him with six sewing machines to start again.

=== Manufacturing for the Nazi Party ===
In 1931, Hugo Ferdinand Boss became a member of the Nazi Party, receiving the membership number 508 889, and a sponsoring member ("Förderndes Mitglied") of the Schutzstaffel (SS). He also joined the German Labour Front in 1936, the Reich Air Protection Association in 1939, and the National Socialist People's Welfare in 1941. He was also a member of the Reichskriegerbund and the Reichsbund for physical exercises. After joining these organizations, he received orders for the production of clothing for the Nazi Party and its organizations, which helped Hugo Ferdinand Boss to stabilize the company again and his sales increased from 38,260 ℛ︁ℳ︁ ($26,993 U.S. dollars in 1932) to over 3,300,000 ℛ︁ℳ︁ in 1941. Though he claimed in a 1934–35 advertisement that he had been a "supplier for National Socialist uniforms since 1924", it is probable that he did not begin to supply them until 1928 at the earliest, but was one of the first to produce brown shirts, copies of the "Lettow shirts" introduced to the Sturmabteilung (SA) by Gerhard Roßbach in 1924 rather by chance. The factory was "one of numerous smaller manufacturing companies involved in uniform production".

Hugo Boss was not involved in the design of the uniform. 1924 is also the year the company became a Reichszeugmeisterei-licensed supplier of uniforms to the SA, SS, Wehrmacht, Hitler Youth, National Socialist Motor Corps, and other party organizations.

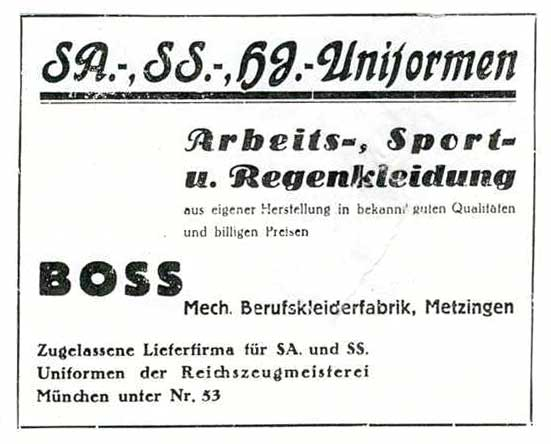
1933 ad placed by Hugo Boss for Nazi uniforms, work, sports, and rainwear

By the third quarter of 1932, the all-black SS uniform was designed by SS members Karl Diebitsch (artist) and Walter Heck (graphic designer). The Hugo Boss company was one of the companies that produced these black uniforms for the SS. By 1938, the firm was focused on producing Wehrmacht uniforms and later also uniforms for the Waffen-SS.

During the Second World War, besides its 300 employees, Hugo Boss employed 140 forced laborers, the majority of them women from the Soviet Union and Poland. In addition to these workers, 40 French prisoners of war also worked for the company briefly between October 1940 – April 1941. According to German historian Henning Kober, the company managers were fervent Nazis who were all great admirers of Adolf Hitler. In 1945, Hugo Ferdinand Boss had a photograph in his apartment of him with Hitler, taken at Berghof, Hitler's Obersalzberg retreat.

Because of his early Nazi Party membership, his financial support of the SS, and the uniforms delivered to the Nazi party, Hugo Ferdinand Boss was considered both an "activist" and a "supporter and beneficiary of National Socialism". In a 1946 judgment, he was stripped of his voting rights, his capacity to run a business, and fined "a very heavy penalty" of 100,000 ℛ︁ℳ︁ ($70,553 U.S.) (£54,008 stg), which was later decreased to 25,000 ℛ︁ℳ︁. However, Hugo Ferdinand Boss appealed, and he was eventually classified as a "follower", a lesser category, which meant that he was not regarded as an active promoter of National Socialism.

In June 2000, Hugo Boss joined the Foundation Initiative of German Business for the Compensation of Forced Laborers and contributed financially to the fund. An initial study commissioned by the company at the end of the 1990s on the situation in the Third Reich was not published by the company. The author, Elisabeth Timm, later published it on the internet herself. Later, the economic historian Roman Köster conducted an independent study, which was also financed by the company and published by C. H. Beck in 2011. In the same year, the company issued a statement of "profound regret to those who suffered harm or hardship at the factory run by Hugo Boss under National Socialist rule".

=== Post-war and development into a fashion company ===
Hugo Ferdinand Boss died in 1948, but his business survived. His son Siegfried Boss and his son-in-law Eugen Holy took over ownership and management of the company. Production initially focused on uniforms for the French army and the French Red Cross, then on uniforms for the post office, railroads and police. In 1950, the company received its first order for men's suits, resulting in an expansion to 150 employees by the end of the year. Hugo Boss men's suits first appeared on the market in 1953.

By 1960, the company was producing ready-made suits. In 1967, Eugen retired, leaving the company to his sons Jochen and Uwe, who began international development. In 1970, the first Boss branded suits were produced and in 1972, the Holy brothers opened the first factory outlet in a nearby warehouse, which later became the Outletcity Metzingen. In 1975, the Austrian designer Werner Baldessarini was hired and eventually became head designer. The Boss brand was registered as a trademark in 1977. This was followed by the start of the company's long association with motorsport, sponsoring Formula One teams.

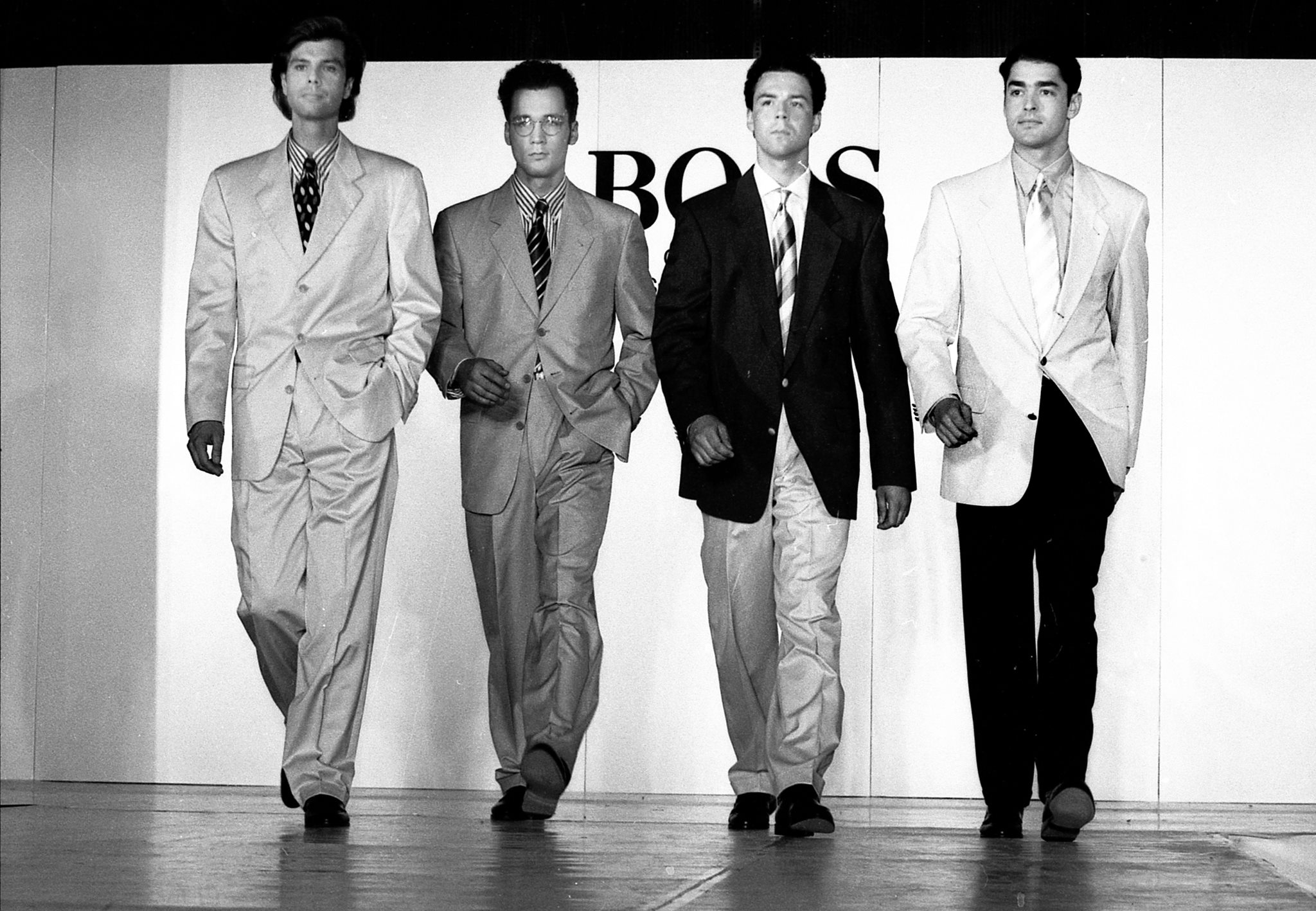
Models at a Hugo Boss fashion show in the 1980s

In 1984, the first Boss branded fragrance appeared. This helped the company gain the required growth for listing on the Frankfurt Stock Exchange the following year. The brand began a golf sponsorship for Bernhard Langer in 1986 and tennis for the Davis Cup in 1987. In 1989, Boss launched its first licensed sunglasses. Later that year, the company was bought by a Japanese group.

After the Marzotto textile group acquired a 77.5% stake for $165,000,000 in 1991, the Hugo, Boss and Baldessarini brands were introduced in 1993. In the same year, the Holy-brothers left the company and Peter Littmann became the new Chairman of the Management Board.

In 1995, the company launched its footwear range, the first in a now fully developed leather products range, across all sub-brands. A partnership with the Solomon R. Guggenheim Foundation was launched in 1995, resulting in the Hugo Boss Prize. In 1997, Littmann left the company after differences of opinion with the Marzotto Group and Baldessarini was appointed CEO in 1998.

Women's fashion (Hugo Womenswear) was first introduced in 1998, with the first women's fragrance (Hugo Woman) appearing at the same time. Since then, multiple fragrances and skincare ranges have been launched. In January 1999, Hugo Boss launched its first website. Also in 1999, the Boss Orange brand was launched as a separate line for casual wear, followed by Boss Selection (2004) and Boss Green, which emerged from Boss Golf in 2004. 2000 saw the launch of Boss Woman, a product line initially managed by German fashion designer Grit Seymour in Milan, which has since also been presented at Berlin Fashion Week and New York Fashion Week. In 2002, the company was repositioned with a design team at the Metzingen site. The Baldessarini brand was sold to Werner Baldessarini in 2006 and replaced in the Boss range by the Boss Selection collection. Boss Selection was expanded in 2009 to include Boss Selection Tailored Line, but was integrated into the core Boss brand in mid-2012.

=== Recent history and rise to an international fashion group ===
Boss store in Christchurch, New Zealand

In 2002, Baldessarini left the company and Bruno Sälzer took over the position of CEO. Under his leadership, Hugo Boss was transformed into a lifestyle group, the women's line was repositioned, and international expansion was driven forward, particularly in the Asian markets. In 2005, Marzotto spun off its fashion brands into the Valentino Fashion Group. In 2007, Valentino was acquired by financial investor Permira for €3.5 billion, which subsequently exerted a significant influence on the Hugo Boss company. Sälzer left the company in February 2008. In mid-2008, Permira appointed Claus-Dietrich Lahrs as CEO of Hugo Boss. Shortly afterward, the company launched an online shop in the UK, followed by other countries.

In 2009, the Boss brand was by far the largest segment, consisting of 68% of all sales. The remainder of sales were made up by Boss Orange at 17%, Boss Selection at 3%, Boss Green at 3% and Hugo at 9%. Also in 2009, Hugo Boss was carved out of the Valentino Fashion Group; from then on, the Hugo Boss stake was held by Permira via its Red & Black Holding. Since a share placement on the stock exchange in November 2011, Permira has held around 66% of the total share capital and 89% of the voting rights in Hugo Boss. In 2010, the company had sales of $2,345,850,000 and a net profit of $262,183,000, with royalties of 42% of total net profit. Hugo Boss then had at least 6,102 points of sale in 124 countries. Hugo Boss AG directly owned over 364 shops, 537 mono-brand shops, and over 1,000 franchisee-owned shops.

In June 2013, designer Jason Wu was hired as artistic director of the Boss womenswear collection. The collaboration ended in 2018. In March 2015, Permira announced plans to sell the remaining shares of 12%. Since the exit of Permira, 91% of the shares have been floating on the Frankfurt Stock Exchange, and the residual 2% have been held by the company. 15% of the shares are owned by the Marzotto family.

Lahrs left the Group in 2016 and the former CFO Mark Langer was appointed as the new CEO in mid-May. In the same year, Coty took over the perfume licenses for Hugo Boss from Procter & Gamble. A realignment took place shortly afterwards. As a result, the Boss Orange and Boss Green lines were discontinued, and only the Boss and Hugo brands remained active. Furthermore, the company's own global prices were adjusted, while unprofitable stores were closed, existing ones modernized and the e-commerce business was expanded. In 2017, Hugo Boss was also included in the Dow Jones Sustainability Index for the first time. In the same year, the sales of Hugo Boss climbed by 7% during the final quarter of the year. In 2020, Mike Ashley's British Frasers Group acquired a stake of around 5% in Hugo Boss. This stake was reduced to 2.63% by February 2023, but Ashley has access to a further 24.69% via financial instruments.

In September 2021, the European Center for Constitutional and Human Rights filed a complaint with German prosecutors accusing Hugo Boss of abetting and profiting from forced labor in Xinjiang. In 2022, researchers from Nordhausen University of Applied Sciences identified cotton from Xinjiang in Hugo Boss shirts.

In June 2021, Daniel Grieder took over as CEO of Hugo Boss. Under his direction, the growth strategy Claim 5 was introduced, with the objective of improving the consumer journey and product offerings, increasing relevance, and driving growth across all geographical regions. This strategy is intended to ensure the sustainable growth of the company. In the same year, Daniel Grieder set the goal of achieving a revenue of 4 billion euros by 2025. As this revenue target was reached two years earlier, Hugo Boss increased the revenue target for 2025 to 5 billion euros in June 2023.

In 2022, Marco Falcioni was appointed Creative Director. The same year, Hugo Boss invested in the start-up Heiq Aeoniq LLC, which is developing the cellulose fabric Heiq Aeoniq. In 2023, the fiber was first used in the company's textiles.

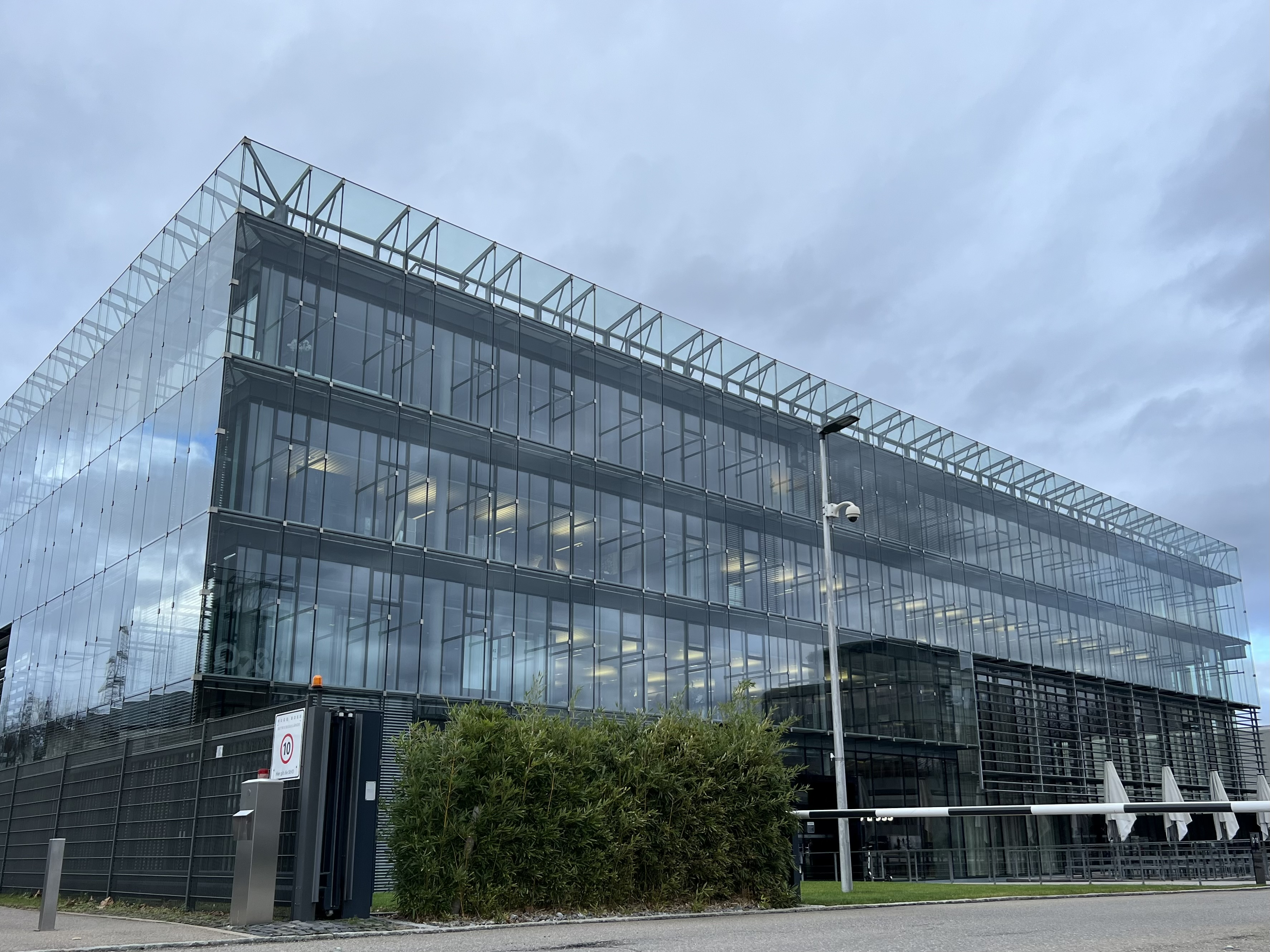
Headquarters in Metzingen

In order to meet increased demands, the Group invested 100 million euros in a new distribution building at the Bonlanden-Filderstadt site near Stuttgart in the same year. The investments were in digitalization and automation, and robotics applications.

In June 2023, Hugo Boss opened the Hugo Boss Digital Campus in Gondomar, Portugal. In 2025, Hugo Boss opened a new flagship store in Barcelona on the Passeig de Gràcia.

In December 2024, the Frasers Group increased its stake of directly held shares in the company to 19.25%, after already announcing in a mandatory filing in August that it had raised its share to more than 15%.

In December 2025, Hugo Boss AG presented Claim 5 Touchdown, a further development of its corporate strategy running until 2028. This builds on the Claim 5 strategy that has been in place since 2021. Among other things, the plan includes adjustments in the areas of brand management, sales and operational processes. A decline in revenue in the mid- to high-single-digit percentage range was expected for 2026, before growth is set to resume from 2027 onwards. An EBIT margin of around 12% was cited as the medium- to long-term target.

In January 2026, Kerstin Dorst took over as head of the newly created Womenswear business unit at Hugo Boss. In February 2026, Dietmar Knoess was appointed Senior Vice President Global Human Resources at Hugo Boss.

In June 2026, Frasers Group launched a takeover bid for the rest of the company. By September 2026, Frasers Group had increased their stake in Hugo Boss to 47.89%. In September 2026, Hugo Boss announced that Michael Murray would succeed Stephan Sturm as Chairman of the Supervisory Board. On 23 October 2026, Frasers Group increased its stake in Hugo Boss to 50.08%, becoming its majority shareholder and making Hugo Boss a subsidiary of the British company.

== Fundamentals ==
The key trends of Hugo Boss are (as at the financial year ending December 31):

Year	Revenue (€ m)	Net income (€ m)	Number of employees
2012	2,346	307	11,852
2013	2,432	329	12,496
2014	2,572	333	12,990
2015	2,809	319	13,764
2016	2,693	194	13,798
2017	2,733	231	13,985
2018	2,796	236	14,685
2019	2,884	205	14,633
2020	1,946	–220	13,759
2021	2,786	137	14,041
2022	3,651	210	16,930
2023	4,197	258	18,738
2024	4,307	213	18,623
2025	4,270	249	17,527

== Products and business units ==
Since 2017, Hugo Boss has pursued a two-brand strategy, with the core brand Boss (stylized as BOSS) for upscale business and leisure wear and Hugo (stylized as HUGO) for a young target group. The company has additional licensing agreements with Coty, C.W.F., Movado and Safilo for product collaborations.

Hugo Boss is active in the following segments:

=== Boss ===
Logo of Boss

The core Boss brand includes several product lines, which are distinguished by colour names, including Boss Black, Boss Orange, Boss Green and Boss Camel. These lines offer business attire and casual wear ranging from classic to fashionable and casual-sporty styles.

Boss Black offers classic clothing for men and women. The range includes, amongst other things, jackets, coats, suits, tuxedos, and evening dresses.

The Boss Green range features sportswear for men, including golfwear. The range was first launched in 1998 as Boss Golf.

Boss Orange includes casual wear. The range was first launched in 1998 as Boss Sport, and since 2006 it has also included women’s clothing.

Boss Camel is the higher-end clothing range within the Boss brand. The range includes, amongst other things, garments made from cashmere.

Since spring 2025, the Boss by Beckham range (formerly Beckham x Boss) has also been available in collaboration with David Beckham. The range consists of menswear and accessories, including suits, blazers, trousers, knitwear, jackets, shoes, and bags. The designs predominantly feature muted colours and materials such as wool, cashmere, corduroy, leather, and suede. Stylistically, they combine formal wear with elements of casual and workwear.

The brand is aimed at an older target group (millennials).

In 2025, Boss Womenswear accounted for 7% of the company’s total sales, whilst Boss Menswear accounted for 78% of total sales.

=== Hugo ===
Logo of Hugo

Hugo: The Hugo brand began producing fashion for men in 1993, followed by fashion for women (Hugo Womenswear) in 1998. The brand is now aimed at Generation Z across all genders. In February 2024, Hugo Boss introduced another brand line called Hugo Blue with clothing made from denim and other fabrics.

In 2025, the Hugo brand accounted for 15% of total sales.

=== Other areas ===
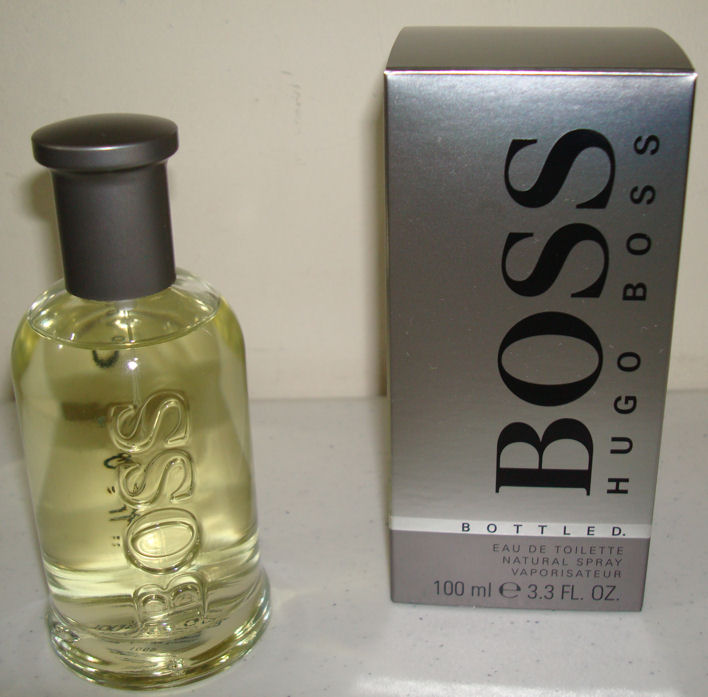
Boss Bottled, a fragrance launched in 1998

- Children's clothing: Collections for children have been available since 2008, initially under the Boss Orange brand. In 2009, the license for children's clothing was awarded to C.W.F. Children Worldwide Fashion SAS. Children's clothing was initially produced exclusively under the Boss brand; since 2022 also under the Hugo brand.
- Shoes: Hugo Boss has been producing shoes since 1995. Initially, MH Shoes & Accessories was a licensee, but since 2004 the Group has been producing the shoes in-house under their Boss and Hugo brands.
- Fragrances: Perfumes, creams, deodorants and shower gels for men and women are offered under the names Boss and Hugo. The first Boss perfume, the men's fragrance Hugo Boss, which was renamed Boss Number One in 1998, is still continued. The popular women's fragrance Boss Alive was advertised with actress Emma Roberts.
- Eyewear and watches: The company has been producing eyewear under license since 1989 and watches since 1996.
- Home textiles: In 2011, the Boss Home collection of bed linen, towelling and other home textiles was also produced under license, presented at a trade fair and subsequently marketed.
- Riding apparel: Since August 2023, Hugo Boss has had riding apparel produced by Bold Equestrian Ltd. under the Boss Equestrian brand.
- Writing instruments: Hugo Boss also has writing instruments manufactured under license.
- Dog accessories: The company has been producing accessories for dogs under license since 2022.
- Tourism industry: early 2024 the company has taken over a luxury rental villa in Balinese Canggu, an area undergoing frenetic tourism development. Their high-paying clients receive Boss-labelled merchandises as freebies.

Products are manufactured in a variety of locations, including the company's own production sites in: Metzingen, Germany; Morrovalle, Italy; Radom, Poland; İzmir, Turkey; and Cleveland, United States.

Hugo Boss has invested in technology for its made-to-measure program, using machines for almost all tailoring traditionally done by hand.

In 2020, Hugo Boss created its first vegan men's suit, using all non-animal materials, dyes, and chemicals.

== Shareholders and stock exchange ==
The Hugo Boss shares have been included in the MDAX since March 1999. Until June 2012, the share capital was divided into common and preferred stock. On June 15, 2012, after the close of trading, the preference shares were converted into ordinary shares and all shares were converted into registered shares. Since then, the company's share capital has consisted of around 70.4 million no-par value registered ordinary shares. In 2023, a promissory bill loan with a total value of €175 million was placed for the first time.

As of September 2026, the shareholder structure was as follows:

- Free float: 38%
- Frasers Group: 48%
- Marzotto family (via PFC S.r.l. / Zignago Holding S.p.A): 14%

== Marketing ==
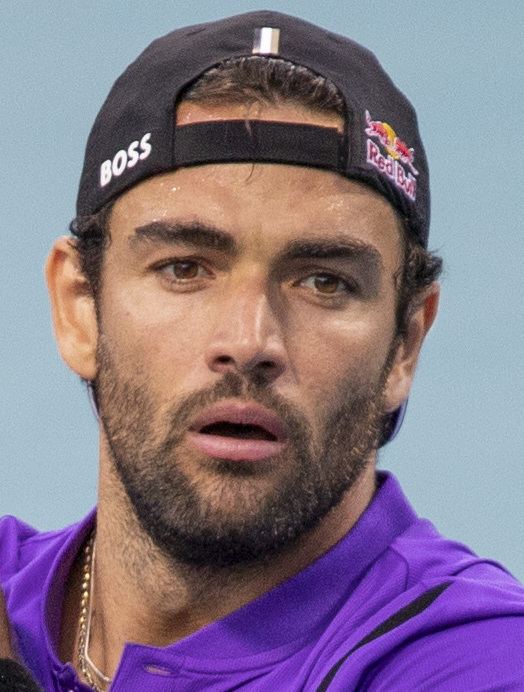
Matteo Berrettini wearing a Boss-branded cap at the 2025 Miami Open

As early as the 1980s, Hugo Boss began with product placements and the outfitting of celebrities. Among other things, Hugo Boss outfitted the actors of the popular US law series L.A. Law and was henceforth seen as the outfitter of yuppies. Hugo Boss dressed the leading actors Don Johnson and Philip Michael Thomas in the crime series Miami Vice. Other well-known personalities wore Boss outfits at the time, such as Michael Jackson, who wore a white Boss suit on the album cover of Thriller, or Sylvester Stallone, who wore a Boss sweater as Rocky.

From 1996 to 2022, Hugo Boss AG sponsored the Hugo Boss Prize, an annual $100,000 stipend in modern arts, awarded by the Solomon R. Guggenheim Foundation every two years as a cultural sponsor, and supported international contemporary exhibitions. In collaboration with the Staatliche Modeschule Stuttgart, the company has presented the Hugo Boss Fashion Award to fashion students since 1987.

In 2022, the brand expanded its involvement in tennis, signing Matteo Berrettini as a brand ambassador. In February 2024, a fashion collection designed by supermodel Naomi Campbell was introduced. In March of the same year, Hugo Boss became the official outfitter of tennis player Taylor Fritz, with Fritz wearing Hugo Boss both on the court and during public appearances. In May, the company announced a multi-year partnership with former football player David Beckham, who will design and curate his own collections as part of the collaboration.

In 2025, the Boss brand became a partner of the Art Basel Awards. The awards are presented in nine categories, including three for artists and others for key figures in the art world.

In 2025, the actors Aaron Pierre and Ishaan Khatter, along with the musician S.Coups, the tennis player Taylor Fritz and the model Amelia Gray, featured in a Boss autumn/winter campaign.

=== Sports sponsorships ===
A Hugo Boss-sponsored yacht during Cowes Week in 2012

In the field of sports sponsorships, Hugo Boss has been active in motorsport, golf, association football, sailing, tennis, and winter sports. The company's activities began in the 1970s with the support of racing driver Jochen Mass, and were further expanded in motorsport through the sponsorship of the McLaren Formula 1 team from 1981 to 2014, one of the longest partnerships in motorsport. This led to several drivers being outfitted with Hugo Boss clothing, including Alain Prost, Ayrton Senna, and Niki Lauda.

Boss has been the official clothing partner of the Aston Martin F1 team since July 2022. One year later, Boss also appointed Aston Martin driver Fernando Alonso as a brand ambassador. Since September 2024, Hugo Boss has been the official partner and outfitter of German football club VfB Stuttgart.

In April 2026, it was announced that Hugo Boss would become the official outfitter of the Australian Open Series from 2027.

== See also ==
- Hugo Boss Prize
- List of companies involved in the Holocaust
