= Christmas in Nazi Germany =

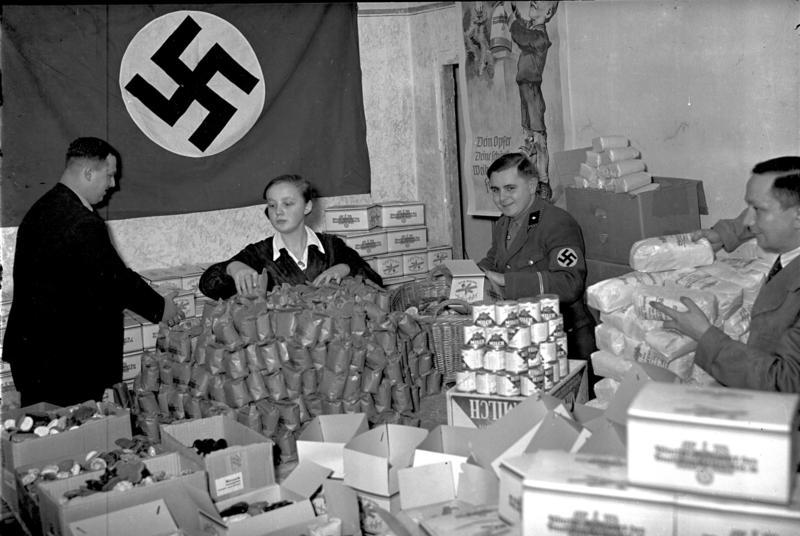
Christmas presents for the poor in 1935

The celebration of Christmas in Nazi Germany included attempts by the regime to bring the Christian religious holiday into line with Nazi ideology. The Jewish origins of Jesus and the commemoration of his birth as the Jewish Messiah was troubling for some members of the Nazi Party and their racialist beliefs. Between 1933 and 1945, some government officials attempted to remove these aspects of Christmas from civil celebrations and concentrate on cultural pre-Christian aspects of the festival. However, church and private celebrations remained Christian in nature.

== Background ==
Christianity had long been the main faith of the Germanic peoples, dating to the missionary work of Columbanus and St. Boniface in the 6th–8th centuries. The Nazis ruled Germany from 1933 to 1945. Nazism wanted to transform the subjective consciousness of the German people—their attitudes, values and mentalities—into a single-minded, cohesive "national community". According to the American journalist Shirer, "under the leadership of Rosenberg, Bormann and Himmler—backed by Hitler—the Nazi regime intended to destroy Christianity in Germany, if it could, and substitute the old paganism of the early tribal Germanic gods and the new paganism of the Nazi extremists."

Hitler and the Nazi party promoted "Positive Christianity" early on, but Hitler had a falling out with Alfred Rosenberg and declared it not to be the official stance of the Nazi party. Positive Christianity itself was not exclusively Christian and was open to non-theists and even promoted Wotan in Rosenberg's Myth of the 20th Century.

Early Nazi celebrations of Christmas occurred in 1921 when Adolf Hitler made a speech in a beer hall in Munich to 4,000 supporters. Undercover police reporters wrote that the crowd cheered when Hitler condemned "the cowardly Jews for breaking the world-liberator on the cross", swearing he was "not to rest until the Jews ... lay shattered on the ground." The crowd then sang carols and nationalist hymns around a Christmas tree, with gifts being donated to working-class attendees of the speech. After taking power in 1933, Nazi ideologues initially sought to reject Germany's long-held Christmas traditions—renaming the festival Julfest, and propagating its Germanic origins as the celebration of the winter solstice. But for the majority of Germans, the Christian traditions remained the basis of the holiday, and the churches were outraged by the removal of Christ from Christmas and maintained the Christian traditions among themselves.

== Christmas in the Nazi regime ==
Nazi ideologists claimed that the Christian elements of the holiday had been superimposed upon ancient Germanic traditions. They argued that Christmas Eve originally had nothing to do with the birth of Jesus Christ but instead celebrated the winter solstice and the "rebirth of the sun", and that the swastika was an ancient symbol of the Big Dipper in its 4 positions in the spring equinox, summer solstice, September equinox and the winter solstice. Further, they perceived that Santa Claus was a Christian reinvention of the Germanic God Wotan, more commonly known in his name in Norse mythology as Odin. Accordingly, holiday posters were made to depict Odin as the "Christmas or Solstice man", riding a white charger, sporting a thick grey beard and wearing a slouch hat, carrying a sack full of gifts. The traditional crèche was replaced by a garden containing wooden toy deer and rabbits; Mary and Jesus were depicted as a blonde mother and child.

The Christmas tree was also changed. The traditional names of the tree, Christbaum or Weihnachtsbaum, was renamed in the press as a fir tree, light tree or Jul tree. The star on the top of the tree was sometimes replaced with a swastika, a Germanic sun wheel or a sig rune, and swastika-shaped tree lights. During the height of the movement, an attempt was made to remove the association of the coming of Jesus and replace it with the coming of Hitler, referred to as the "Saviour Führer".

Christmas carols were also changed. The words to "Silent Night" were changed so it made no reference to God, Christ, or religion. Words were also changed to the hymn "Unto Us a Time Has Come" so as to remove references to Jesus. The modified version of the hymn was in use for several more years in post-war Germany. The most popular carol promoted by the Nazis was Hans Baumann's "Exalted Night of the Clear Stars" [Hohe Nacht der klaren Sterne], which replaced traditional Christian themes with Nazi racial ideologies. The carol was popular after the collapse of Nazi Germany, was regularly performed into the 1950s, and is still sometimes performed in the modern day.

Shop catalogues containing children's toys made available during the holiday season featured chocolate SS soldiers, toy tanks, fighter planes and machine guns. As a sign of appreciation, Heinrich Himmler frequently gave SS members a Julleuchter ("Yule lantern"), a kind of ornate Germanic candlestick, some of which were made at Dachau concentration camp. Housewives were prompted to bake biscuits in the shape of birds, wheels and swastikas for their children.

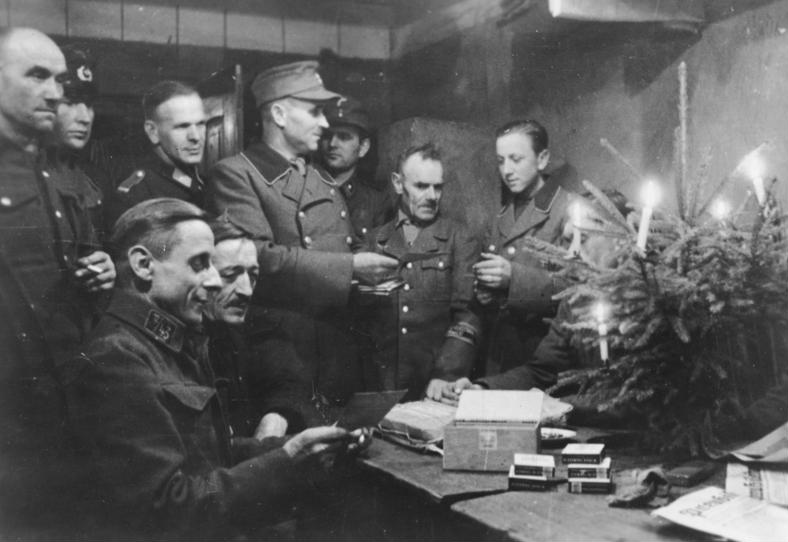
German Volkssturm soldiers in Christmas 1944, East Prussia

By 1944 the movement to remove Christian influences from Christmas lessened as the government concentrated more on the war effort. In 1944 civil celebrations of Christmas marked the festival as a day of remembrance for Germany's war dead.

== Opposition ==
While most Germans embraced the Nazis' rebranding of Christmas, at times it was reported that there was hostility by a minority. Files from the National Socialist Women's League reported, "that tensions flared when propagandists pressed too hard to sideline religious observance, leading to "much doubt and discontent.'" The clergy were among those opposed to the redefining of Christmas. Reports say that in Düsseldorf the clergy used Christmas to promote women's clubs and encourage membership; the Catholic clergy threatened any woman who joined the National Socialist Women's League with excommunication; and some religious women boycotted Christmas events organised by National Socialist Women's League.

== See also ==
- Kirchenkampf
- Religion in Nazi Germany
- Weihnachten
- Winterhilfswerk
