= Children Worldwide Fashion SAS =

French clothing company

- Industry: French licensee
- Number of locations: 35 showrooms
- Products: children's ready-to-wear clothing
- Revenue: sales of €170 million (2010)

Children Worldwide Fashion SAS is a French licensee that manages children's ready-to-wear clothing for Hugo Boss, Burberry, Chloe, DKNY, Elle, Marc Jacobs, Marithe et Francois Girbaud, and Timberland. In 2010, it had sales of €170 million and managed 35 showrooms. It is in 56 countries and its licensed products are distributed at 2,700 points of sale or through company stores, such as Younly or Les Ateliers de Courcelles.
