= Walter Heck =

German graphic designer and Nazi officer

- Born: 8 December 1897; Cologne, Kingdom of Prussia, German Empire
- Died: unknown
- Occupations: Graphic designer and SA and SS officer
- Known for: Creating the SS double rune symbol for the Nazi Schutzstaffel

Walter Heck designed the infamous typographic logo for the SS, the elite corps of the Nazi party, in 1929.

Walter Heck (8 December 1897 – unknown) was a German graphic designer who created the SS double 'Siegrune' symbol for the Schutzstaffel (SS), the elite corps of the Nazi Party, in 1929, the runic emblem of the Sturmabteilung (SA), and co-designed the all-black SS uniform in 1932. He was an SA-Sturmhauptführer (company commander) in the SA, and later joined the SS.

== Design of the SS symbol ==
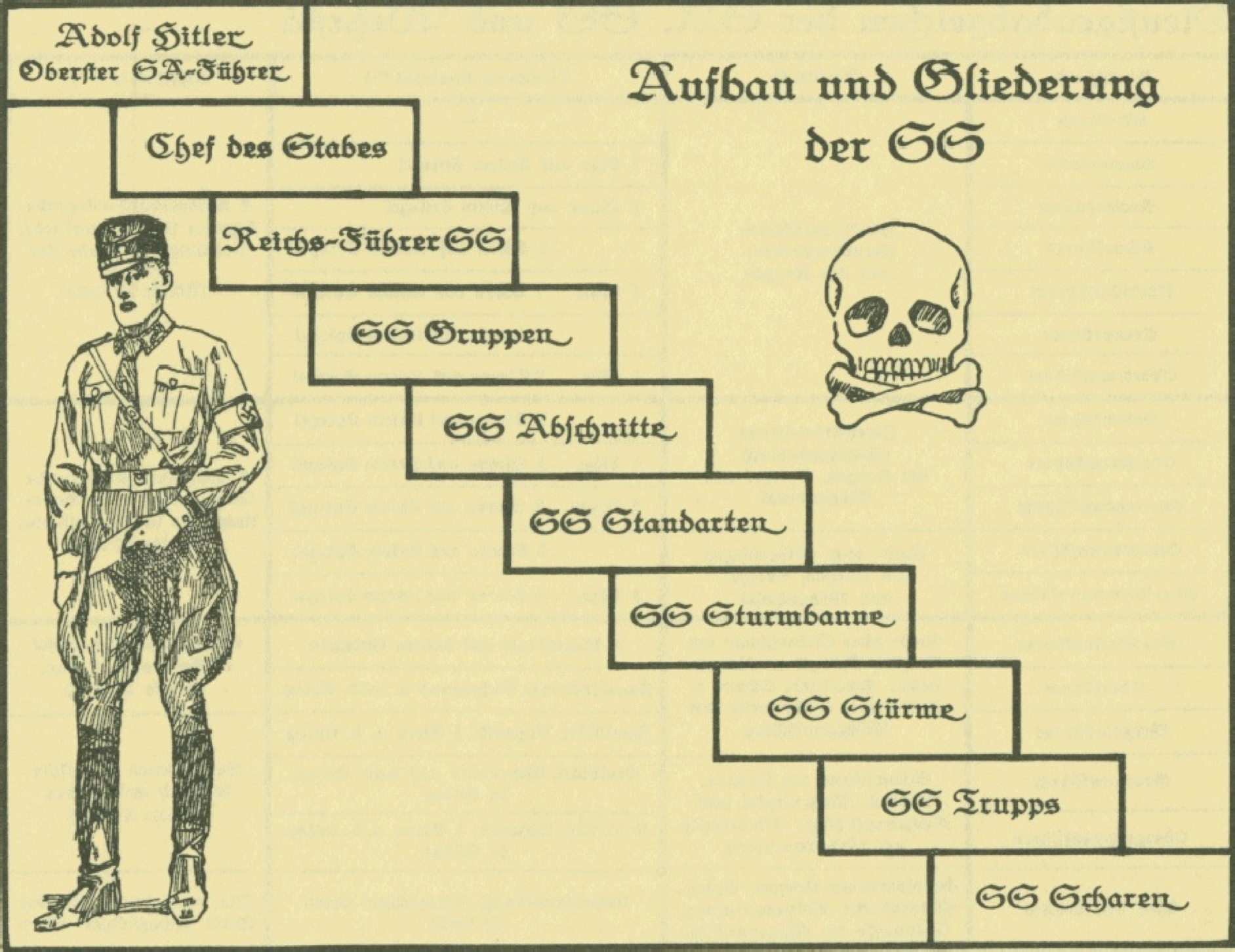
A page from a uniform booklet published late 1932, where 'SS' (Schutzstaffel) is written in Fraktur script. The image also shows the early SS brown shirt uniform and an early variant of the Nazi elite corps' skull symbol (Totenkopf).

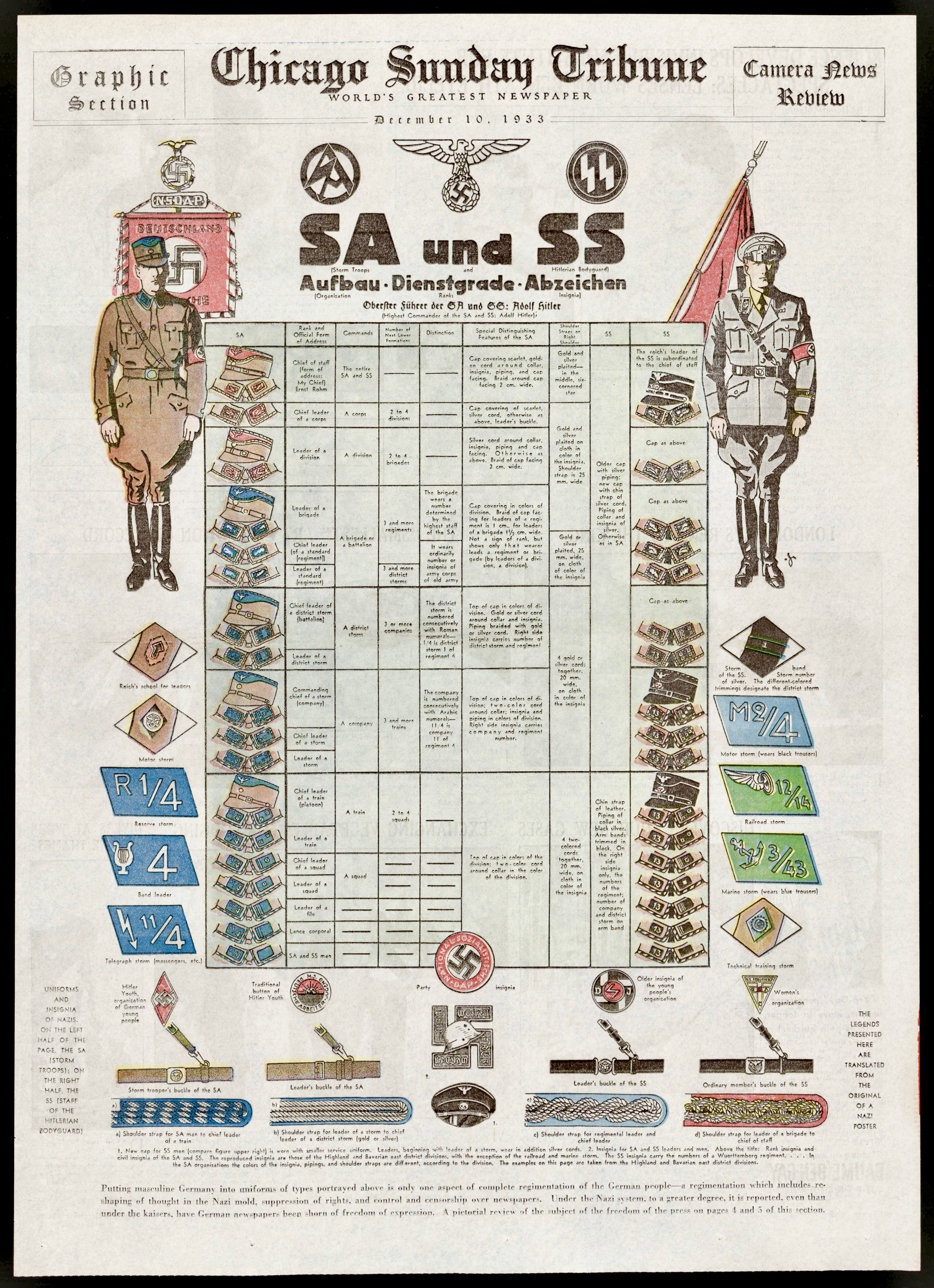
German uniform chart reproduced in an American newspaper in December 1933. At the top, Heck's new SS logo, his runic SA (Sturmabteilung) emblem, and the black SS uniform he designed together with Karl Diebitsch can be seen.

Heck was born in Cologne and worked for Ferdinand Hoffstätter in Bonn, a company that made badges, and "worked in a studio focused on military designs."

In 1929, Heck designed the SS logo, not based on some ancient Aryan Germanic rune as mythologised by the Nazis, but because he wanted to move away from the Fraktur lettering ubiquitous in Germany at the time and also thought that the capital "S" used in the standard Latin alphabet was too soft to represent the values of the SS. He may also have been influenced by the lightning bolt symbol used as a high voltage warning symbol. He was paid 2.5 ℛ︁ℳ︁ for his work (about $2). At the time, Heck was an SA-Sturmhauptführer (company commander) in the Sturmabteilung (SA), and would join the SS in December 1932 (SS number 1,947). By 9 November 1933, he was promoted to SS-Obersturmführer.

In 1944, during the Second World War, a fellow officer wrote to Heinrich Himmler on Heck's behalf asking for some special consideration for Heck on account of the very small payment he had received for his design work on the SS symbol, and the fact that he was impoverished and had not retained any copyright on the design. Himmler wrote to Heck in response to say that, after the war was over, he intended to give Heck a family home with a garden but that he expected him to have started a family and have at least two children by then.

== Other designs ==
Heck also designed the SA-Runes badge, a combination of a runic S and a Gothic A, and in 1932, with Karl Diebitsch, he designed the all-black SS uniform, not Hugo Boss as is often stated, although Boss's eponymous company, Hugo Boss AG, did manufacture them.

== Legacy ==
In 2017, the German television channel ZDFinfo released a 50-minute documentary Signs of Evil – The Runes of the SS from Silke Potthoff, which explored the history of the "SS" symbol and Heck's role in its design.
