= Julleuchter =

Type of earthenware candle-holder

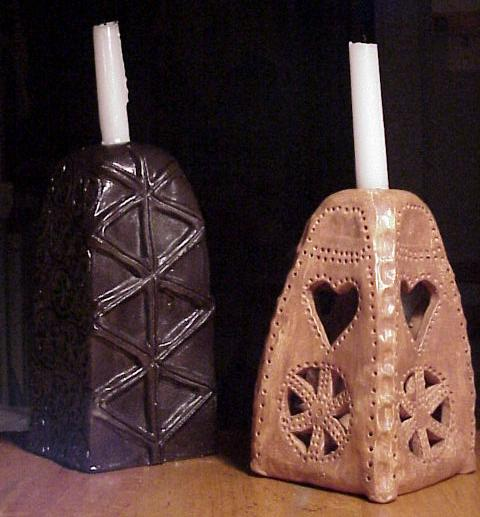
Two Turmleuchter type ceramic candle-holders—the right one replicates the design of the SS Julleuchter, itself based on an early modern candle-holder from southern Sweden.

Julleuchter (German pronunciation: [ˈjuːlˌlɔʏçtɐ]; "Yule lantern") or Turmleuchter ("tower lantern") are modern terms used to describe a type of earthenware candle-holder originating in 16th-century Sweden, later redesigned and manufactured in Nazi Germany.

== Swedish artefact ==
"The Julleuchter housed in the Nordic Museum has a height of 15 cm and a base of 8.2 cm squared.[citation needed]

The candle-holder has an incised heart shape and below a six-spoked opening. This artefact was described in 1888 in the magazine of the Swedish literary club Runa (founded by Johan August Strindberg), which compared the six-spoked window in its base with the shape of the medieval h-rune; the 1888 article attributed a 16th-century date to the object (the earliest date of the introduction of candles to Scandinavian households).[citation needed]

There are several surviving specimens of this type of candle-holder from Sweden. A comparable specimen was on display in the open-air museum of Skansen, based on a photograph kept in the Detmold state archive." the old text under the title "Swedish artefact"

== Germanic mysticism and Nazi symbolism ==
The Runa article came to the attention of Herman Wirth because of its supposed "Hagal rune" (the six-spoked window at its base) who mentioned it in his Ura Linda Chronik, whence it passed into Nazi-era Germanic mysticism. In a 1936 memorandum, Heinrich Himmler set forth a list of approved holidays, in part supposedly based on "pagan" traditions, including a "Julfest" intended to replace Christian rites. The Julleuchter and other symbols were also meant to serve as a consolation to women who, by having married into the SS, had to renounce the spiritual shelter and service of their church. The SS soldier was instructed to set up a shrine that included a Julleuchter in the corner of one room of his household.

An article about the Julleuchter was published in the German magazine "Germanien" in December 1936. The author argued that this "millennia old" lantern was to be used as "a memento of the "Year of the Great Migrations of the people of the north"". Another article was published in the SS periodical SS-Leitheft Jahrgang 7 Folge 8a. In 1939 the Julleuchter was also mentioned in "Die Gestaltung der Feste im Jahres und Lebenslauf in der SS-Familie"(Celebrations of the SS Family) by Fritz Weitzel.

The information about the 1936 issue of Germanien magazine about the Julleuchter is actually from the later magazine "Der Freiwillige." The article in "Der Freiwillige" reports Germanien magazine being, ..."the official organ of the German ancestor inheritance registered association, Berlin." The information given in that latter article is from Germanien magazine.

A 1936 issue of Germanien magazine claimed that the "millennium old" lantern had been used as a memento of the "Year of the Great Migrations" of the people of the north and as the small light of humanity under the stars of the night sky. When used during the 2 Solstice periods of the year, this is a symbol of the victory of Light over the Darkness, and also as a token of Eternal Circulation. The Julleuchter stands for an inseparable community, its conscience and attitude, and that it was used as a symbol of never ending sunlight. Further, the magazine stated that when the Julleuchter was used during the holiday of Yule (what is now known as The 12 Days of Christmas), twelve candles are used. One is used each night symbolizing the twelve months, until the 31 of December when the "July Moon shines." On that night a thirteenth candle is used for the new coming month of January. The candles always burn below but on the last night, the candle is again transferred upward – this is the sun, which is spilled in order to return to the earth from the gloom of another peace.

== Use in Himmler's SS ==
The SS-Julleuchter was considered both an award and trophy of the German Schutzstaffel that was presented to members of the SS from approximately 1936 until 1944 as a service decoration. Manufactured by the Allach porcelain company, the SS Julleuchter was presented to any SS member who participated in a Julfest.

Heinrich Himmler originally had the intention to make the Julleuchter a standard gift to all SS members and there were no criteria attached to its presentation. For reasons which are not entirely clear, by the start of World War II, the Julleuchter had begun to be viewed as an SS decoration, and was entered as such in SS service records once the Julleuchter had been presented. However, as the SS-Julleuchter was considered "non-portable" (much like the Luftwaffe Honor Goblet), there was no outward display on an SS uniform indicating its presentation.

Apparently even as the Red Army was advancing and the fall of Berlin was in the foreseeable future, The Julleuchter was used during the decoration French volunteers in the Waffen-SS. One surviving soldier said, "In the light of a candle burning on a Julleuchter, a Jule Candlestick, symbolizing the never dying sunlight, Fenet decorated a number of comrades with the Iron Cross. Although simple, the ceremony that evening seemed all the more extraordinary."

=== SS Julfest ===
Not only the presents but the whole celebration should be full of surprises for all members of the family. The father lights the candle in the Jul-Leuchter, or 'Jul Earthenware Candlestick', from which the tree candles in turn get their light. [...] The Jul-Leuchter, presented by Reichsführer-SS Himmler to the SS Man, is the most important symbol used throughout the year to mark celebrations and commemorations. Its cut-out Heart represents hearth and home, and the Hagal Rune peace through victory. At midnight, when the candles on the Yuletide Tree are burnt down, the SS Man will put the Jul-Leuchter on the table. The Candlestick with its year-long candle has been lit at every family celebration the past year. Its candle has burned down, and it should receive a new one tonight. Just as our ancestors never let the sacred hearth cooking fire extinguish, so our Jul-Leuchter must always have a light. Thus it becomes a symbol of the never dying sunlight. Everyone becomes very thoughtful when the old candle finally burns down and the new one is put in its place. (From "Celebrations of the SS Family" by Fritz Weitzel, 1939)

=== Manufacture in the Allach factory ===
In January 1936, the SS Porzellan Manufaktur Allach was created in Munich under the control of Heinrich Himmler. Well known artists were forced to participate. The output of the factory included over 240 porcelain and ceramic models. Due to a rapid expansion, the factory was not able to meet production targets, and so in October 1937 a part of production was shifted to the SS-operated Allach sub camp of the Dachau concentration camp. Originally the Allach factory manufactured only art ceramic, like plates, jugs and vases, but in the war years they also produced simple utensils like ointment containers and cafeteria table-ware.

Special occasion gift items for SS supporters were also made and given away at dinner parties and other events. Starting from 1941 German civilians and about 50 prisoners of the Allach sub camp of the Dachau concentration camp were forced to produce art and porcelain. The Allach sub camp of Dachau remained the main location for porcelain manufacture even after the original factory in the town of Allach was modernized and reopened. The factory in the town of Allach was retrofitted for the production of ceramic products such as household pottery. The fall of the Third Reich brought an end to the Allach factory. The Allach factories were shut down in 1945 and never reopened.

Allach porcelain made a variety of candle holders ranging from elaborate gilded baroque candelabras, to the most basic plain white porcelain single candle holder. More candleholders were made than for other Allach items, indicating popularity and interest among the German people. The varying styles and low cost (due to slave labor) of the candleholders produced at Allach allowed most Germans of every class to own them.

The Allach factory deposited the Julleuchter design with the Imperial Patent Office in Berlin on 16 January 1936. The Allach Julleuchter was unique in that it was made as presentation piece for SS officers to celebrate the winter solstice. It was later given to all SS members on the same occasion, 21 December. Made of unglazed stoneware, the Julleuchter was decorated with early pagan Germanic symbols.

=== Significant recipients ===
- Hans Baur
- Amon Göth
- Heinrich Himmler
- Ernst Kaltenbrunner
- Josef Albert Meisinger
- Oswald Pohl

== See also ==
- Christmas in Nazi Germany
- Religion in Nazi Germany
- Religious aspects of Nazism
