= Degen (SS) =

Nazi SS dress sword

SS-Ehrendegen
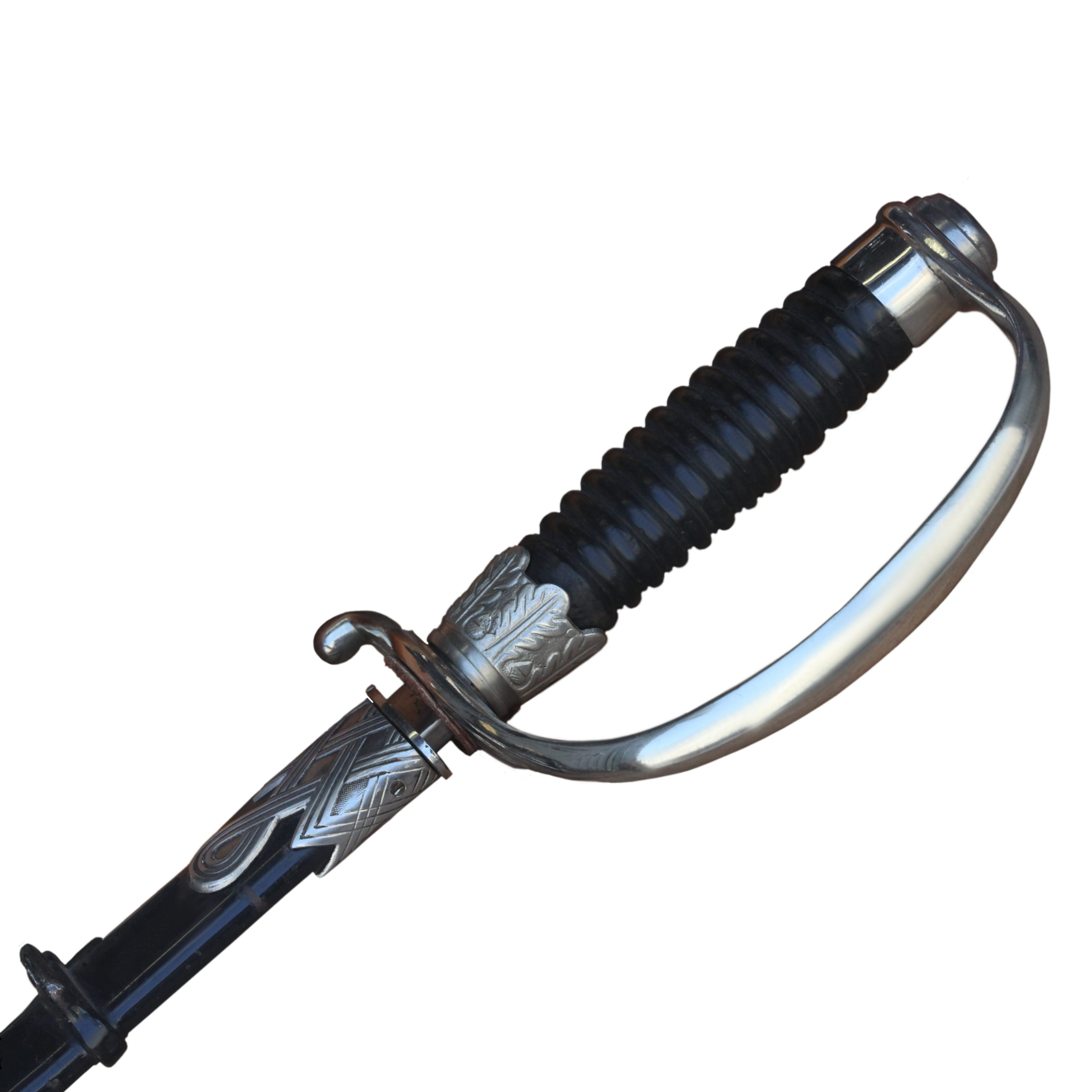
- Type: Dress sword

Service history
- Used by: Schutzstaffel

Production history
- Produced: 1935–1945

Specifications
- Blade type: Single-edged, straight bladed.

The SS-Ehrendegen or SS Honour Sword, also SS-Degen (officially Ehrendegen des Reichsführers SS), is a straight dress sword that was worn with an SS uniform from 1935 to 1945. First introduced in 1935, the SS sword was designed by Karl Diebitsch, Heinrich Himmler's personal advisor on art and design within the SS. It was originally manufactured by the Peter Dan. Krebs firm of Solingen, Germany.

The sword has a long thin straight blade produced at different lengths to accommodate the height of the wearer. The Degen's hilt features a D-shaped knuckle-bow (fingerguard) and a black ribbed wooden grip. The grip is bound with silver wire and features an inset disc featuring the SS lightning-bolt runes. The scabbard is painted in black enamel and has decorative silvered top (locket) and bottom (chape) mounts. It was worn with an aluminium braid sword knot embellished with the SS runes in black on the stem.

== Honour award ==
The officer's sword was officially awarded with a hand-signed certificate from Himmler to selected officers of the SS-Verfügungstruppe and SS-Totenkopfverbände in recognition of special merit. It was also awarded to officers who graduated from the SS-Junker Schools, the SS officer training centres. The non-commissioned officer (NCO) version is similar to the officer version, but the scabbard has a plain, unadorned chape. The NCO version's handle also lacks the silver wire wrapping and the SS runes are moved from the handle to the pommel cap.

== Damascus blade ==
The Damascus-bladed Honour Swords are extremely rare. They were awarded to a select few by Himmler personally, usually to high-ranking SS leaders, or important businessmen or statesmen who held an honorary SS rank of at least SS-Oberführer. Since they were often given to recipients on their birthday (usually their 50th), they are also known as "Birthday Honour Swords".
