= Karl Diebitsch =

SS officer and German artist (1899–1985)

- Karl Diebitsch wearing all-black SS uniform he had designed
- Born: 3 January 1899; Hanover, German Empire
- Died: 6 August 1985 (aged 86); Kreuth, West Germany
- Military career
- Allegiance: German Empire; Nazi Germany; FRG
- Branch: Schutzstaffel; Waffen-SS
- Service years: 1915–1918; 1934–1945
- Rank: SS-Oberführer
- Units: Personal Staff Reichsführer-SS; SS-Totenkopfverbände; 5th SS Panzer Division Wiking

Karl Diebitsch (3 January 1899 – 6 August 1985) was an artist and the Schutzstaffel (SS) officer responsible for designing much of the SS regalia during the Nazi era, including the chained SS officer's dagger scabbard. Diebitsch worked with graphic designer Walter Heck to draft the well-known all-black SS uniform. Also with his business partner, industrialist Franz Nagy, Diebitsch began the production of art porcelain at the factory Porzellan Manufaktur Allach.

== Life ==
Diebitsch was born on 3 January 1899, in the city of Hanover, Germany. In Hanover he completed his apprenticeship as a decorating painter after the First World War, because of his enlistment in the Imperial German Navy in 1915. He earned the Iron Cross, Second Class, while with an artillery battery during World War I.

After a short time being employed as a merchant, he resumed his education. Diebitsch enrolled in the Design School of the Academy of Plastic and Graphic Arts in Munich on 29 October 1919.

=== Joining the Nazi Party ===
On 1 May 1920, Diebitsch joined the Nazi Party (NSDAP). His membership number was 1,436. From 1920 to 1923 he was a member of the Freikorps (Free Corps). Two years after the Beer Hall Putsch Diebitsch went on to complete his formal art training in 1925, followed by several years of living and working in Munich as a painter and graphic artist. When the Nazis came to power in 1933, Diebitsch moved his family to Berlin and there joined the Reichsverband Bildender Künstler Deutschlands (National Association of German Visual Artists). In 1932, the new all-black SS uniform was designed by Diebitsch with graphic designer Walter Heck. In November 1933 he joined the SS (membership number 141,990), and in 1937 he re-joined the NSDAP, with a membership number of 4,690,956.

== Artworks for Nazi Germany ==
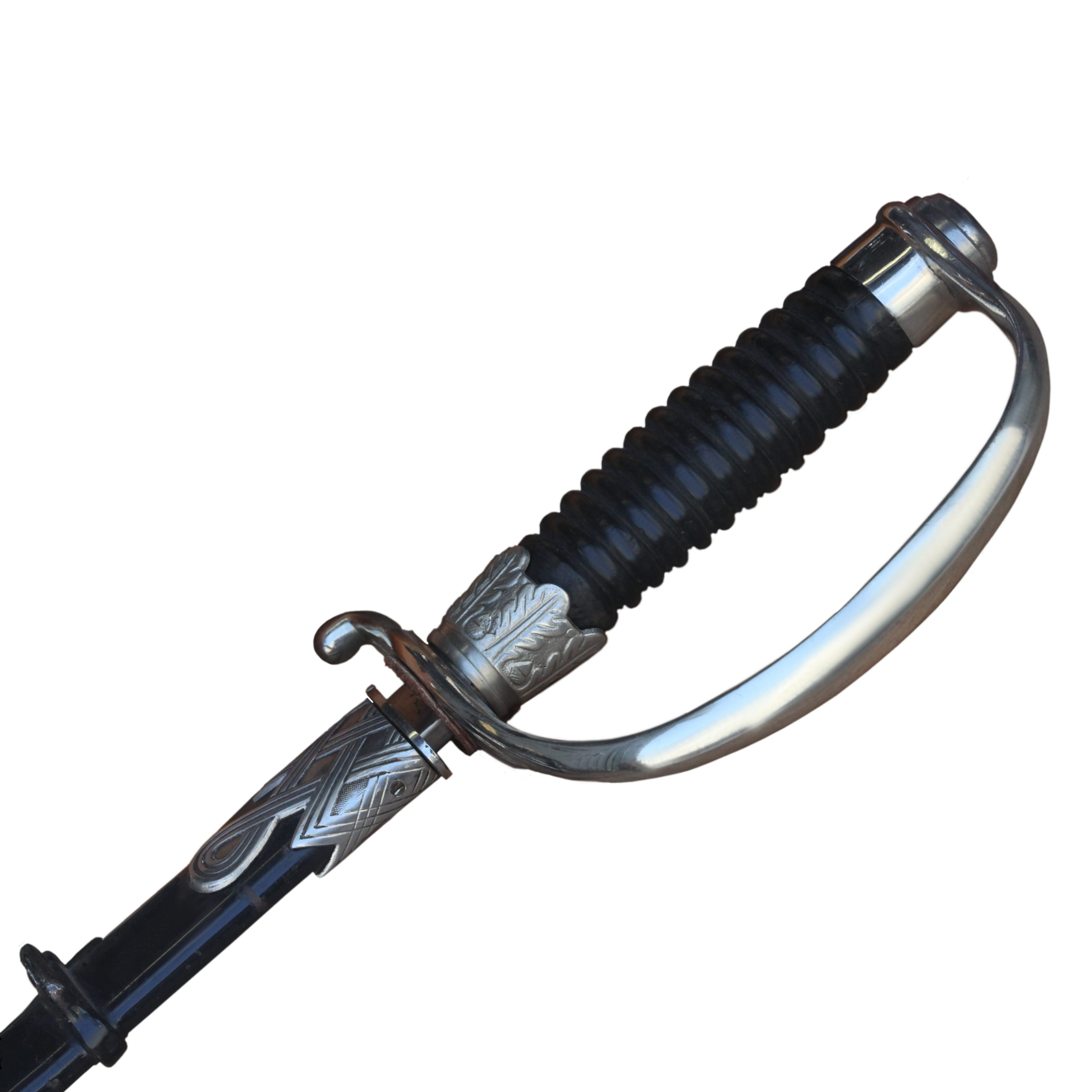
Handle of the Degen (SS), a ceremonial straight saber or smallsword, designed by Diebitsch

Diebitsch served as the director of SS Porzellan Manufaktur Allach in 1936 until the SS enterprise had its porcelain production facility moved to Dachau. In the same year he designed SS dagger and sword parts, along with many other SS items. In 1938 he received one of the top prizes at a House of German Art exhibition in Munich for his painting titled, Mutter (Mother). In 1939 Diebitsch designed the letterhead logo of the Ahnenerbe and crests for SS officers. In May 1939 he designed a window for an exterior wall of the "König-Heinrich" dome at Quedlinburg Abbey. Diebitsch also designed many German postage stamps during the Third Reich. He was given an honorary title of Professor by Adolf Hitler. He served on the Personal Staff Reichsführer-SS and designed a tapestry that was created by Elsie Seifert.

== War years and later life ==
Besides being an artist, Diebitsch was also a reserve officer in the Waffen-SS during the course of the Second World War. He received staff assignments to the SS-Totenkopfstandarte (SS Death’s Head Regiment), SS-Regiment "Germania", SS-Division "Wiking" and the Höchste SS- und Polizeiführer Italien (Highest SS and Police Leader Italy). Diebitsch was finally promoted to the rank of SS-Oberführer (senior colonel) on 20 April 1944. After the war, he was pardoned during the Nuremberg trials. In following years Diebitsch worked as a porcelain painter for the Heinrich & Co factory. He died in 1985.

== See also ==
- Allach (concentration camp)
- Allach (porcelain)
- Art of the Third Reich
- List of German painters
