= Munich-Allach concentration camp =

Forced labour camp in southern Germany

Coordinates: 48°12′55″N 11°29′29″E

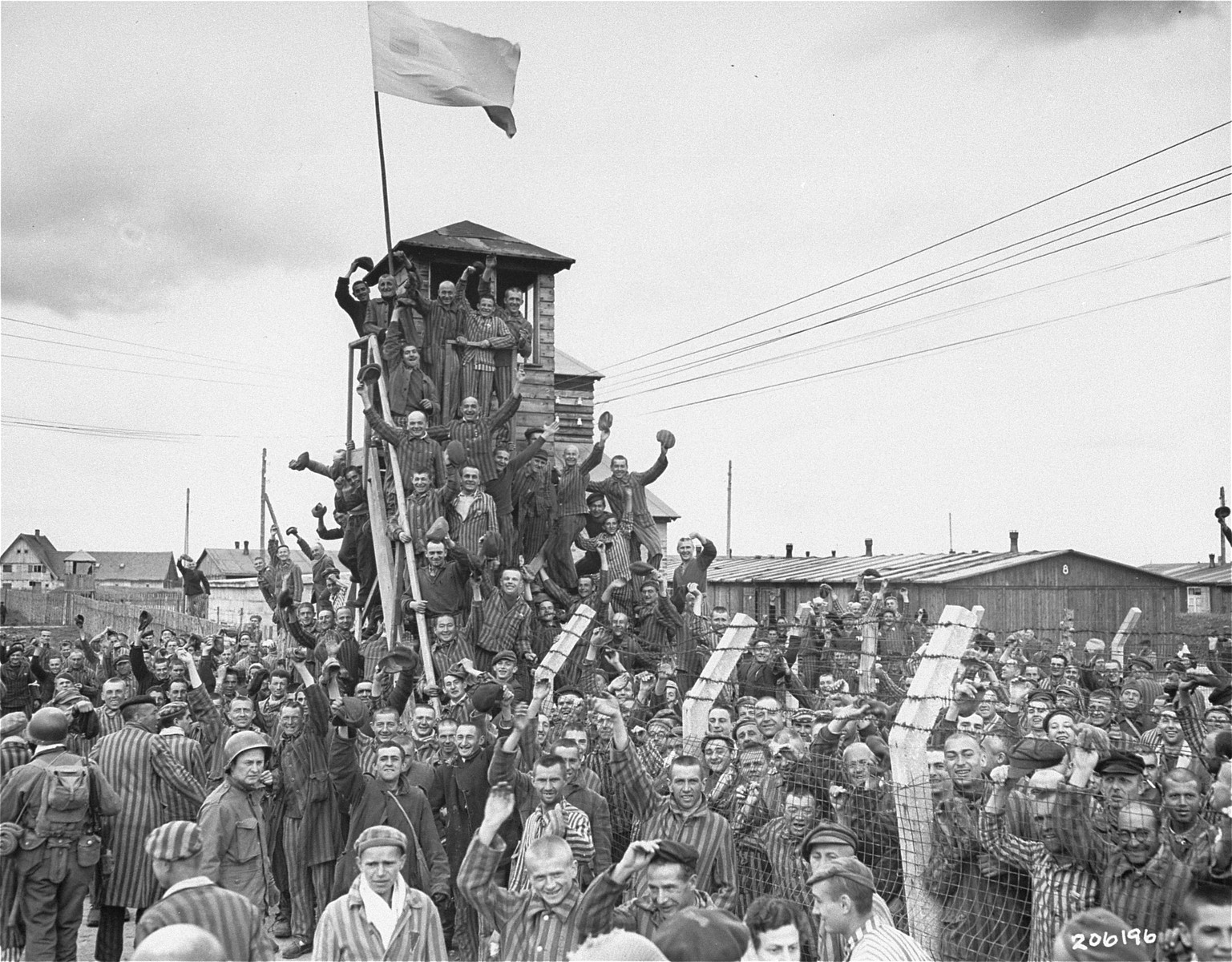
Survivors in Allach, a sub-camp of Dachau, greet arriving U.S. troops (Photo: Sidney Blau, April 30, 1945. United States Holocaust Memorial Museum)

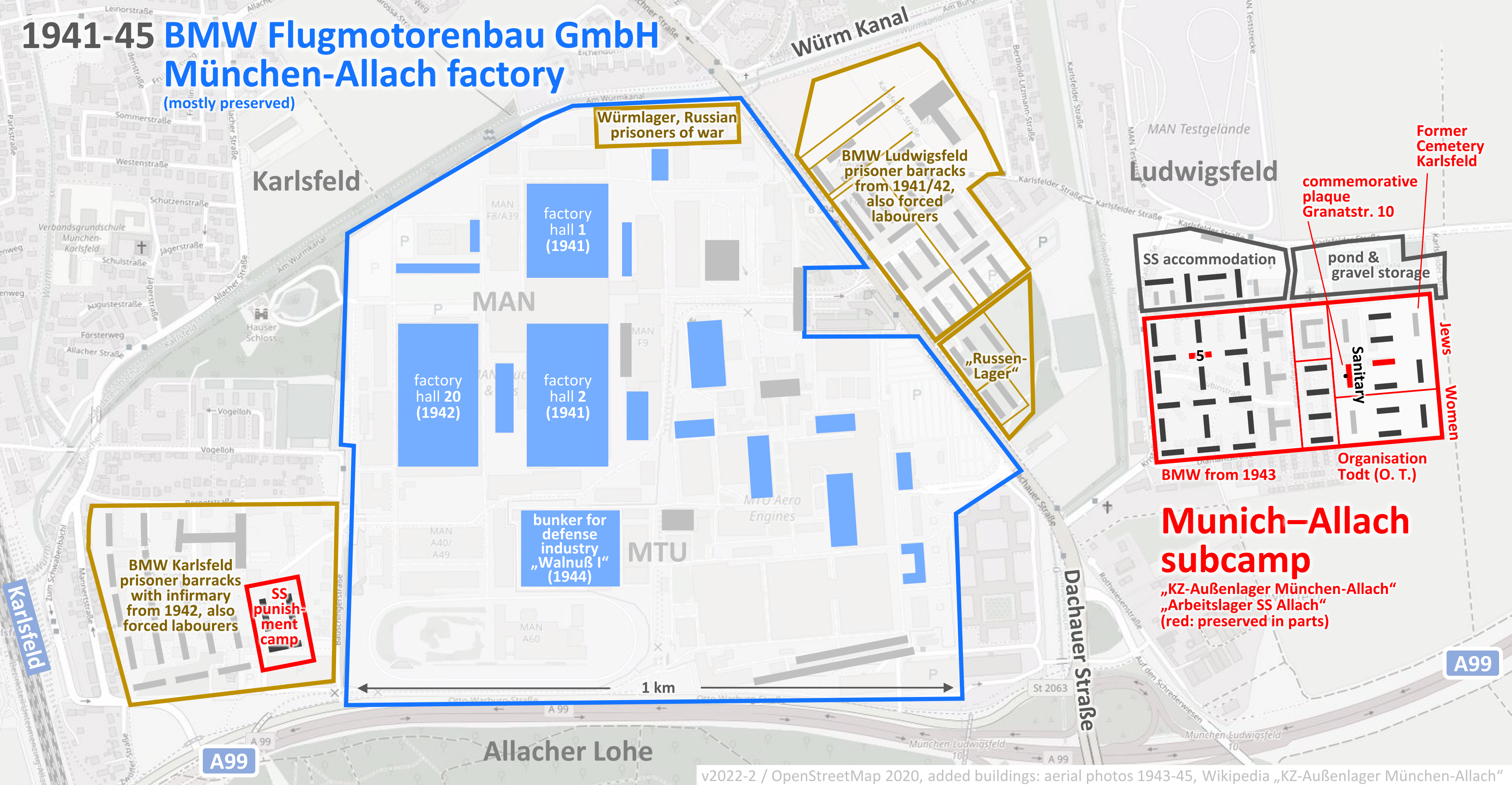
Map of sub-camp Munich-Allach (red), BMW Flugmotorenwerk (Aircraft engine plant, blue, now Munich, Dachauer Str. 665+667) and the Forced labor and residential camps (brown). See last barack "Sanitär" (on the right, red, now Munich, Granatstr. 10)

Munich-Allach concentration camp was a forced labour camp established by the Nazi Schutzstaffel (SS) in Allach-Untermenzing, a suburb of Munich in southern Germany, in 1943. It provided slave labour for nearby factories of BMW, Dyckerhoff, Sager & Woerner, Kirsch Sägemühle, Pumpel Lochhausen and Organisation Todt with up to 17,000 prisoners in 1945. More than 1,800 of them came to death. It was the largest sub-camp of the Dachau concentration camp system (see map on the right, red square). Another smaller subcamp Allach porcelain a.k.a. Porzellan Manufaktur Allach with about 40 prisoners produced porcelain artworks.

== History ==
A labour camp was established on February 22, 1943, to address workforce shortages in the armament and building industry of Nazi Germany.

== Camp population ==
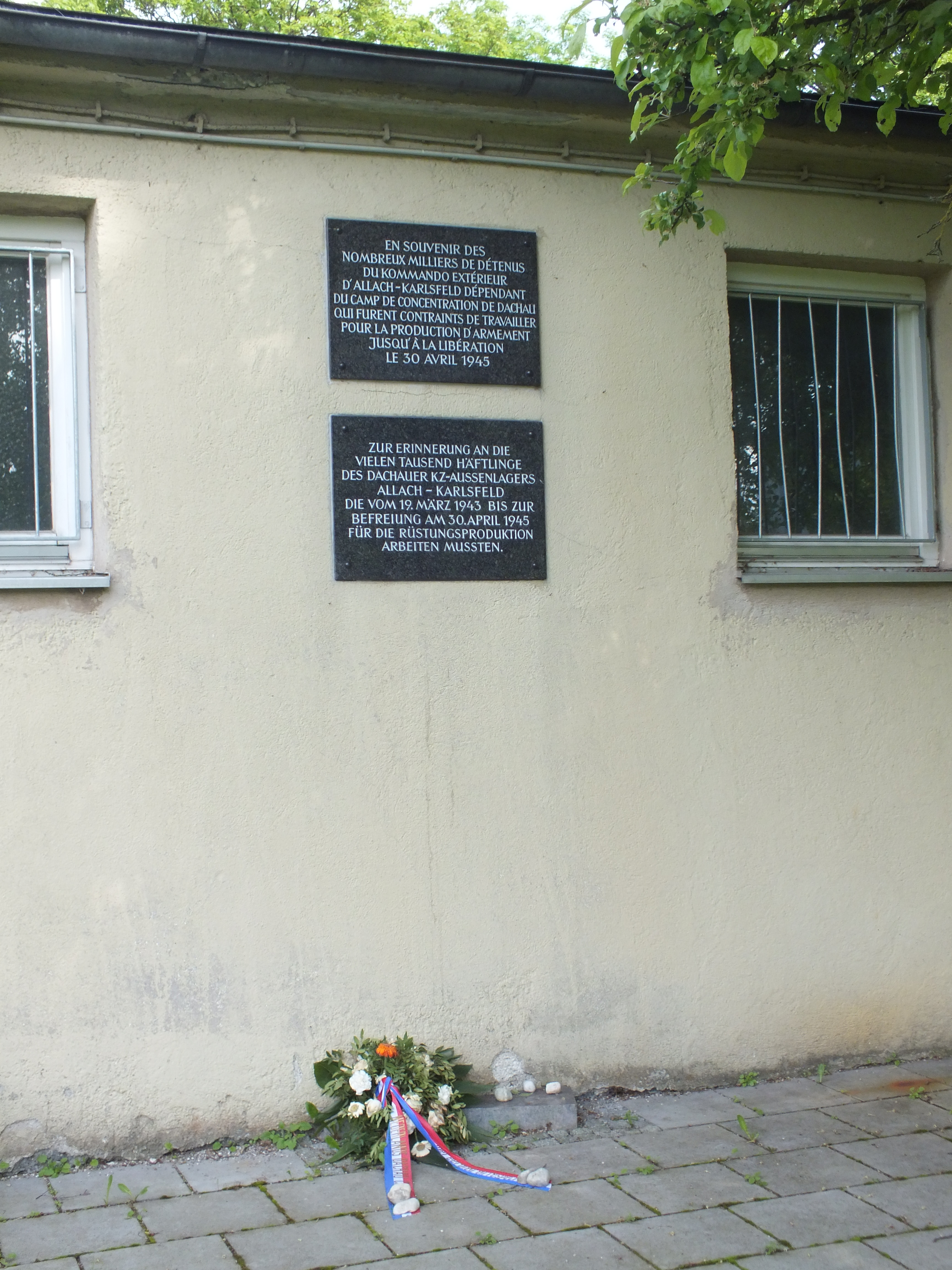
Last existing building of subcamp Allach of Nazi concentration camp Dachau, location Munich, Granatstr. 10 (see map, red barack ″Sanitär″ on the right)

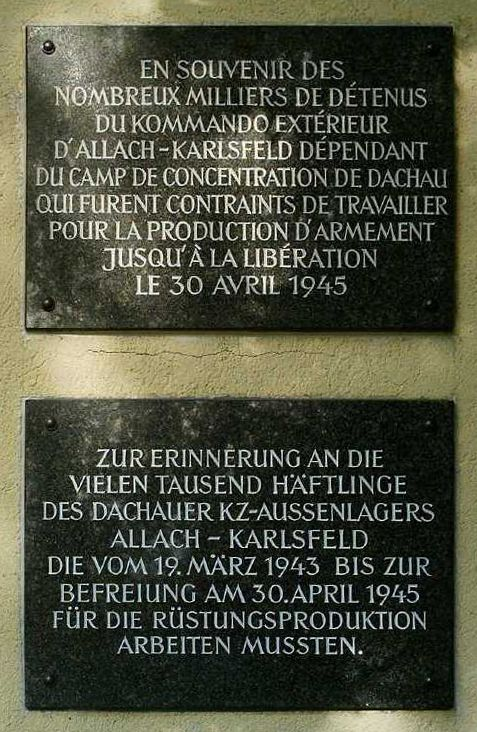
memorial plaque at Munich, Granatstr. 10.

The camp divided Jews from non-Jews as well as men from women. The number of prisoners varied at different points in time. Approximately 3,000–4,000 men were in the camp, with many more as Allach became an end point for many death marches and transports from other concentration camps. The women's camp was much smaller at 200–300 persons. The prisoner population in the non-Jewish camp was mainly French, Russians, Poles, Spanish, Czechs, Belgian and Dutch, as well as victims of racial persecution and German opponents of the regime.

Deaths were normal, both from the cruelty of the SS and from malnutrition, inadequate sanitation and poor hygiene. As a result, dysentery, typhus, tuberculosis and scabies broke out.

== Slave labor ==
It was the first of seven sub-camps to supply the BMW armament factory with slave laborers, where BMW 801 airplane engines were produced and repaired. The entire subcamp, including 31 accommodation barracks, was surrounded by an electrically charged fence and guarded by watchtowers.

== Liberation ==
US soldiers of the 42nd Rainbow Division entered the camp at around 9 am on April 30, 1945, one day after the main camp at Dachau was liberated and on the same day of Hitler's suicide. The 66th Field Hospital, attached to the 42nd Division of the US Seventh Army, was brought to Allach to take care of the sick prisoners. By May 10, they had moved on to help with the typhus epidemic in the main camp.

The fall of the Third Reich brought an end to the Allach concern. The Allach factories were shut down in 1945 and never reopened.

In the meantime, the names and origins of 1,800 dead are known; the actual number is significantly higher.

The successor company MTU Aero Engines (Dachauer Straße 665) and MAN Nutzfahrzeuge (Dachauer Straße 667) are now producing on the premises of BMW Flugmotorenbau GmbH (see map, blue).

== See also ==
- List of Nazi concentration camps
- List of subcamps of Dachau

== Bibliography ==
- Zegenhagen, Evelyn (2009). Encyclopedia of camps and ghettos, 1933 - 1945 / 1, A: Early camps, youth camps, and concentration camps and subcamps under the SS-Business Administration Main Office (WVHA), page 516–517. Bloomington: Indiana Univ. Press. ISBN 978-0-253-35328-3.
