= Allach (porcelain) =

Porcelain factory

Coordinates: 48°11′26″N 11°28′26″E

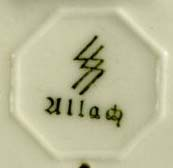
The Allach maker's mark incorporated stylized SS runes.

Porzellan Manufaktur Allach (German pronunciation: [ˈalax]; Allach porcelain manufacture) was produced in Germany between 1935 and 1945. After its first year of operation, the enterprise was run by the SS with forced labor provided by the Dachau concentration camp. The emphasis was on decorative ceramics —objets d'art for the Nazi regime. The company logo included stylized SS runes. Sometimes in place of the company name, the pottery markings mentioned the SS: "DES - WIRTSCHAFTS - VERWALTUNGSHAUPTAMTES" ('SS Main Economic [and] Administrative Office'). Ceramic artist, master potter and author Edmund de Waal describes the double-lightning insignia of the SS that marked the Allach products as a clever transposition of Germany's famed Meissen porcelain mark of two crossed swords.

== History ==
Franz Nagy had owned the land since 1925 that the Munich-Allach facility was built on. With his business partner, the porcelain artist Karl Diebitsch, he began the production of porcelain art. The porcelain factory Porzellan Manufaktur Allach was established as a private company in 1935 in the small town of Allach, near Munich, Germany. In 1936, the factory was acquired by the SS. Heinrich Himmler, the leader of the SS who was known for his obsession with Aryan mysticism, saw the acquisition of a porcelain factory for the production of works of art that would be representative, in Himmler's eyes, of Germanic culture. Allach porcelain was one of Himmler's favorite projects and produced various figurines (soldiers, animals, etc.) to compete in the small but profitable German porcelain market.

High-ranking artists were locked into contract. The output of the factory included over 240 ceramic models. As output at the Allach factory increased, the Nazis moved production to a new facility near the Dachau concentration camp. The use of slave labor from the Dachau camp was strongly denied by the factory managers at the Nuremberg Trials. Initially intended as a temporary facility, Dachau remained the main location for porcelain manufacture even after the original factory in Allach was modernized and reopened in 1940. The factory in Allach was retrofitted for the production of ceramic products such as household pottery.

Karl Diebitsch, was an Obersturmbannführer in the Waffen-SS, and Himmler’s personal referent on art. Theodor Kärner was (besides Diebitsch) one of Germany’s most prestigious artists in porcelain. Kärner also worked with Meissen, Rosenthal and Hutschenreuther.

Allach was a sub-camp of Dachau near Munich, located approximately 16 km from the main camp at Dachau. According to Marcus J. Smith, who wrote "Dachau: The Harrowing of Hell," the Allach camp was divided into two enclosures, one for 3,000 Jewish inmates and the other for 6,000 non-Jewish prisoners. Smith was a doctor in the US military, assigned to take over the care of the prisoners after the liberation. He wrote that the typhus epidemic had not reached Allach until 22 April 1945, about a week before the camp was liberated. The fall of the Third Reich brought an end to the Allach factory. The Allach factories were shut down in 1945, and never reopened.

== Bronze work ==
Over the last couple of years several bronze pieces attributed the estate of Franz Nagy have come to market. Nagy was managing director of Allach Porcelain and each of the pieces were all modeled in porcelain as well during the 3rd Reich. The three noted examples included two of Obermaier's models the Fencer and the Victor, and this rare Karner piece the SS Standard Bearer or SS-Fahnenträger.

== Artistic themes ==
The majority of items produced at Allach as collectibles bolstered Nazi ideology by presenting idealized representations of peasants, historical figures and rural themes.

== The Allach Julleuchter ==
Allach porcelain made a variety of candle holdes ranging from elaborate gilded baroque candelabras, to the most basic plain white porcelain single candle holder. Production numbers for most candleholders were above average for other Allach items. The varying styles and low cost (due to slave labor production) of the candleholders produced at Allach allowed most Germans of every class to own them. The Allach Julleuchter was unique in that it was made as presentation piece for SS officers to celebrate the winter solstice. It was later given to all SS members on the same occasion. Made of unglazed stoneware, the Julleuchter was decorated with early pagan Germanic symbols. Its design is based on artifacts found at an archeological dig in and around Haithabu (Hedeby), and is attributed to the Frisians who once settled there. Himmler said, “I would have every family of a married SS man to be in possession of a Julleuchter. Even the wife will, when she has left the myths of the church find something else which her heart and mind can embrace.” In 1939 52,635, Julleuchter were made, probably the largest production for any single item produced at the Porzellan Manufaktur Allach.

== Post-war works ==
Franz Nagy may have started production again at the factory in Allach because some post-war stoneware pieces have been seen with an Allach mark that has the letter “N” standing for Nagy instead of the SS insignia. Theodor Kärner also reused some of his Allach moulds while he was working at Eschenbach in the US controlled zone of Germany.

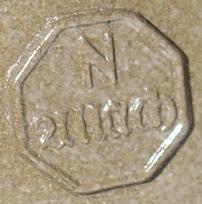
The Allach maker's mark featuring an “N” for Franz Nagy.

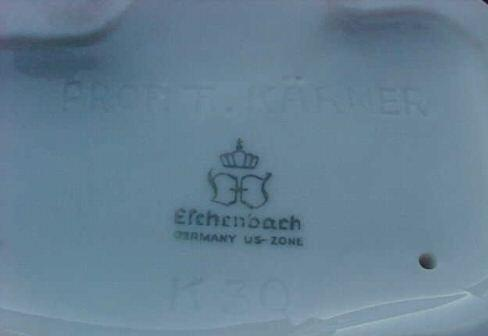
Photo of Theodor Karner work made at Eschenbach.

== See also ==
- Art of the Third Reich
